= Iowa's congressional delegations =

Since Iowa became a U.S. state in 1846, it has sent congressional delegations to the United States Senate and United States House of Representatives. Each state elects two senators to serve for six years, and members of the House to two-year terms. Before becoming a state, the Iowa Territory elected a non-voting delegate at-large to Congress from 1838 to 1846.

These are tables of congressional delegations from Iowa to the United States Senate and the United States House of Representatives.

== Current delegation ==
Current U.S. senators from Iowa
Iowa CPVI (2025): R+6	Class II senator	Class III senator
Iowa CPVI (2025): R+6	Joni Ernst (Junior senator) (Red Oak)	Chuck Grassley (Senior senator) (New Hartford)
Party	Republican	Republican
Incumbent since	January 3, 2015	January 3, 1981

Iowa's current congressional delegation in the 119th Congress consists of its two senators and four representatives, all Republicans.

The current dean of the Iowa delegation is Senator and President pro tempore of the United States Senate Chuck Grassley, having served in the Senate since 1981 and in Congress since 1975.

Current U.S. representatives from Iowa
District	Member (Residence)	Party	Incumbent since	CPVI (2025)	District map
1st	Mariannette Miller-Meeks (Davenport)	Republican	January 3, 2021	R+4	
2nd	Ashley Hinson (Marion)	Republican	January 3, 2021	R+4	
3rd	Zach Nunn (Bondurant)	Republican	January 3, 2023	R+2	
4th	Randy Feenstra (Hull)	Republican	January 3, 2021	R+15	

== United States Senate ==
Class II senator	Congress	Class III senator
George Wallace; Jones (D)	30th (1847–1849)	Augustus C. Dodge (D)
George Wallace; Jones (D)	31st (1849–1851)	Augustus C. Dodge (D)
George Wallace; Jones (D)	32nd (1851–1853)	Augustus C. Dodge (D)
George Wallace; Jones (D)	33rd (1853–1855)	Augustus C. Dodge (D)
George Wallace; Jones (D)	34th (1855–1857)	James Harlan (R)
George Wallace; Jones (D)	35th (1857–1859)	James Harlan (R)
James W. Grimes (R)	36th (1859–1861)	James Harlan (R)
James W. Grimes (R)	37th (1861–1863)	James Harlan (R)
James W. Grimes (R)	38th (1863–1865)	James Harlan (R)
James W. Grimes (R)	39th (1865–1867)	James Harlan (R)
James W. Grimes (R)	39th (1865–1867)	Samuel J. Kirkwood (R)
James W. Grimes (R)	40th (1867–1869)	James Harlan (R)
James W. Grimes (R)	41st (1869–1871)	James Harlan (R)
James B. Howell (R)	41st (1869–1871)	James Harlan (R)
George G. Wright (R)	42nd (1871–1873)	James Harlan (R)
George G. Wright (R)	43rd (1873–1875)	William B. Allison (R)
George G. Wright (R)	44th (1875–1877)	William B. Allison (R)
Samuel J. Kirkwood (R)	45th (1877–1879)	William B. Allison (R)
Samuel J. Kirkwood (R)	46th (1879–1881)	William B. Allison (R)
Samuel J. Kirkwood (R)	47th (1881–1883)	William B. Allison (R)
James W. McDill (R)	47th (1881–1883)	William B. Allison (R)
James F. Wilson (R)	48th (1883–1885)	William B. Allison (R)
James F. Wilson (R)	49th (1885–1887)	William B. Allison (R)
James F. Wilson (R)	50th (1887–1889)	William B. Allison (R)
James F. Wilson (R)	51st (1889–1891)	William B. Allison (R)
James F. Wilson (R)	52nd (1891–1893)	William B. Allison (R)
James F. Wilson (R)	53rd (1893–1895)	William B. Allison (R)
John H. Gear (R)	54th (1895–1897)	William B. Allison (R)
John H. Gear (R)	55th (1897–1899)	William B. Allison (R)
John H. Gear (R)	56th (1899–1901)	William B. Allison (R)
Jonathan P. Dolliver (R)	56th (1899–1901)	William B. Allison (R)
Jonathan P. Dolliver (R)	57th (1901–1903)	William B. Allison (R)
Jonathan P. Dolliver (R)	58th (1903–1905)	William B. Allison (R)
Jonathan P. Dolliver (R)	59th (1905–1907)	William B. Allison (R)
Jonathan P. Dolliver (R)	60th (1907–1909)	William B. Allison (R)
Jonathan P. Dolliver (R)	60th (1907–1909)	Albert B. Cummins (R)
Jonathan P. Dolliver (R)	61st (1909–1911)	Albert B. Cummins (R)
Lafayette Young (R)	61st (1909–1911)	Albert B. Cummins (R)
Lafayette Young (R)	62nd (1911–1913)	Albert B. Cummins (R)
William S. Kenyon (R)	62nd (1911–1913)	Albert B. Cummins (R)
William S. Kenyon (R)	63rd (1913–1915)	Albert B. Cummins (R)
William S. Kenyon (R)	64th (1915–1917)	Albert B. Cummins (R)
William S. Kenyon (R)	65th (1917–1919)	Albert B. Cummins (R)
William S. Kenyon (R)	66th (1919–1921)	Albert B. Cummins (R)
William S. Kenyon (R)	67th (1921–1923)	Albert B. Cummins (R)
Charles A. Rawson (R)	67th (1921–1923)	Albert B. Cummins (R)
Smith W. Brookhart (R)	67th (1921–1923)	Albert B. Cummins (R)
Smith W. Brookhart (R)	68th (1923–1925)	Albert B. Cummins (R)
Smith W. Brookhart (R)	69th (1925–1927)	Albert B. Cummins (R)
Daniel F. Steck (D)	69th (1925–1927)	David W. Stewart (R)
Daniel F. Steck (D)	70th (1927–1929)	Smith W. Brookhart (R)
Daniel F. Steck (D)	71st (1929–1931)	Smith W. Brookhart (R)
L. J. Dickinson (R)	72nd (1931–1933)	Smith W. Brookhart (R)
L. J. Dickinson (R)	73rd (1933–1935)	Louis Murphy (D)
L. J. Dickinson (R)	74th (1935–1937)	Louis Murphy (D)
L. J. Dickinson (R)	74th (1935–1937)	Guy Gillette (D)
Clyde L. Herring (D)	75th (1937–1939)	Guy Gillette (D)
Clyde L. Herring (D)	76th (1939–1941)	Guy Gillette (D)
Clyde L. Herring (D)	77th (1941–1943)	Guy Gillette (D)
George A. Wilson (R)	78th (1943–1945)	Guy Gillette (D)
George A. Wilson (R)	79th (1945–1947)	Bourke B. Hickenlooper (R)
George A. Wilson (R)	80th (1947–1949)	Bourke B. Hickenlooper (R)
Guy Gillette (D)	81st (1949–1951)	Bourke B. Hickenlooper (R)
Guy Gillette (D)	82nd (1951–1953)	Bourke B. Hickenlooper (R)
Guy Gillette (D)	83rd (1953–1955)	Bourke B. Hickenlooper (R)
Thomas E. Martin (R)	84th (1955–1957)	Bourke B. Hickenlooper (R)
Thomas E. Martin (R)	85th (1957–1959)	Bourke B. Hickenlooper (R)
Thomas E. Martin (R)	86th (1959–1961)	Bourke B. Hickenlooper (R)
Jack Miller (R)	87th (1961–1963)	Bourke B. Hickenlooper (R)
Jack Miller (R)	88th (1963–1965)	Bourke B. Hickenlooper (R)
Jack Miller (R)	89th (1965–1967)	Bourke B. Hickenlooper (R)
Jack Miller (R)	90th (1967–1969)	Bourke B. Hickenlooper (R)
Jack Miller (R)	91st (1969–1971)	Harold Hughes (D)
Jack Miller (R)	92nd (1971–1973)	Harold Hughes (D)
Dick Clark (D)	93rd (1973–1975)	Harold Hughes (D)
Dick Clark (D)	94th (1975–1977)	John Culver (D)
Dick Clark (D)	95th (1977–1979)	John Culver (D)
Roger Jepsen (R)	96th (1979–1981)	John Culver (D)
Roger Jepsen (R)	97th (1981–1983)	Chuck Grassley (R)
Roger Jepsen (R)	98th (1983–1985)	Chuck Grassley (R)
Tom Harkin (D)	99th (1985–1987)	Chuck Grassley (R)
Tom Harkin (D)	100th (1987–1989)	Chuck Grassley (R)
Tom Harkin (D)	101st (1989–1991)	Chuck Grassley (R)
Tom Harkin (D)	102nd (1991–1993)	Chuck Grassley (R)
Tom Harkin (D)	103rd (1993–1995)	Chuck Grassley (R)
Tom Harkin (D)	104th (1995–1997)	Chuck Grassley (R)
Tom Harkin (D)	105th (1997–1999)	Chuck Grassley (R)
Tom Harkin (D)	106th (1999–2001)	Chuck Grassley (R)
Tom Harkin (D)	107th (2001–2003)	Chuck Grassley (R)
Tom Harkin (D)	108th (2003–2005)	Chuck Grassley (R)
Tom Harkin (D)	109th (2005–2007)	Chuck Grassley (R)
Tom Harkin (D)	110th (2007–2009)	Chuck Grassley (R)
Tom Harkin (D)	111th (2009–2011)	Chuck Grassley (R)
Tom Harkin (D)	112th (2011–2013)	Chuck Grassley (R)
Tom Harkin (D)	113th (2013–2015)	Chuck Grassley (R)
Joni Ernst (R)	114th (2015–2017)	Chuck Grassley (R)
Joni Ernst (R)	115th (2017–2019)	Chuck Grassley (R)
Joni Ernst (R)	116th (2019–2021)	Chuck Grassley (R)
Joni Ernst (R)	117th (2021–2023)	Chuck Grassley (R)
Joni Ernst (R)	118th (2023–2025)	Chuck Grassley (R)
Joni Ernst (R)	119th (2025–2027)	Chuck Grassley (R)
Josh Turek (D)	120th (2027–2029)	Chuck Grassley (R)

== United States House of Representatives ==
=== 1838–1846: 1 non-voting delegate ===
On July 4, 1838, the Iowa Territory was organized. Most of the area comprising the territory was originally part of the Louisiana Purchase and was a part of the Missouri Territory. When Missouri became a state in 1821, this area (along with the Dakotas) effectively became unorganized territory. The area was closed to white settlers until the 1830s, after the Black Hawk War ended. It was attached to the Michigan Territory on June 28, 1834, and was split off with the Wisconsin Territory in 1836 when Michigan became a state. The Iowa Territory was the "Iowa District" of western Wisconsin Territory – the region west of the Mississippi River. The original boundaries of the territory, as established in 1838, included part of Minnesota and parts of the Dakotas, covering about 194,000 square miles (500,000 km^{2}) of land.

Starting on September 10, 1838, Iowa Territory sent a non-voting delegate to the House.

Years	Delegate from Territory's at-large district
September 10, 1838 – October 27, 1840	William W. Chapman (D)
October 28, 1840 – December 28, 1846	Augustus C. Dodge (D)

=== 1846–1863: 2 seats ===
Following statehood on December 28, 1846, Iowa had two seats in the House. It elected both seats statewide at-large on a general ticket, until 1847, when it redistricted into two districts.

Congress	Elected on a general ticket	
Congress	1st seat	2nd seat
29th (1845–1847)	Serranus C. Hastings (D)	Shepherd Leffler (D)
Congress	1st district	2nd district
30th (1847–1849)	William Thompson (D)	Shepherd Leffler (D)
31st (1849–1851)	William Thompson (D)	Shepherd Leffler (D)
31st (1849–1851)	Daniel F. Miller (W)	Shepherd Leffler (D)
32nd (1851–1853)	Bernhart Henn (D)	Lincoln Clark (D)
33rd (1853–1855)	Bernhart Henn (D)	John Parsons Cook (W)
34th (1855–1857)	Augustus Hall (D)	James Thorington (W)
35th (1857–1859)	Samuel Ryan Curtis (R)	Timothy Davis (R)
36th (1859–1861)	Samuel Ryan Curtis (R)	William Vandever (R)
37th (1861–1863)	Samuel Ryan Curtis (R)	William Vandever (R)
37th (1861–1863)	James F. Wilson (R)	William Vandever (R)

=== 1863–1873: 6 seats ===
Following the 1860 census, Iowa was apportioned 6 seats.

Congress	1st district	2nd district	3rd district	4th district	5th district	6th district
38th (1863–1865)	James F. Wilson (R)	Hiram Price (R)	William B. Allison (R)	Josiah B. Grinnell (R)	John A. Kasson (R)	Asahel W. Hubbard (R)
39th (1865–1867)	James F. Wilson (R)	Hiram Price (R)	William B. Allison (R)	Josiah B. Grinnell (R)	John A. Kasson (R)	Asahel W. Hubbard (R)
40th (1867–1869)	James F. Wilson (R)	Hiram Price (R)	William B. Allison (R)	William; Loughridge (R)	Grenville M. Dodge (R)	Asahel W. Hubbard (R)
41st (1869–1871)	George W. McCrary (R)	William Smyth (R)	William B. Allison (R)	William; Loughridge (R)	Francis W. Palmer (R)	Charles Pomeroy (R)
41st (1869–1871)	George W. McCrary (R)	William P. Wolf (R)	William B. Allison (R)	William; Loughridge (R)	Francis W. Palmer (R)	Charles Pomeroy (R)
42nd (1871–1873)	George W. McCrary (R)	Aylett R. Cotton (R)	William G. Donnan (R)	Madison M. Walden (R)	Francis W. Palmer (R)	Jackson Orr (R)

=== 1873–1883: 9 seats ===
Following the 1870 census, Iowa was apportioned 9 seats.

Congress	1st district	2nd district	3rd district	4th district	5th district	6th district	7th district	8th district	9th district
43rd (1873–1875)	George W. McCrary (R)	Aylett R. Cotton (R)	William G. Donnan (R)	Henry Otis; Pratt (R)	James Wilson (R)	William Loughridge (R)	John A. Kasson (R)	James W. McDill (R)	Jackson Orr (R)
44th (1875–1877)	George W. McCrary (R)	John Q. Tufts (R)	L. L. Ainsworth (D)	Henry Otis; Pratt (R)	James Wilson (R)	Ezekiel S. Sampson (R)	John A. Kasson (R)	James W. McDill (R)	S. Addison; Oliver (R)
45th (1877–1879)	Joseph Champlin; Stone (R)	Hiram Price (R)	Theodore Weld; Burdick (R)	Nathaniel Cobb; Deering (R)	Rush Clark (R)	Ezekiel S. Sampson (R)	Henry J. B. Cummings (R)	William Fletcher; Sapp (R)	S. Addison; Oliver (R)
46th (1879–1881)	Moses A. McCoid (R)	Hiram Price (R)	Thomas; Updegraff (R)	Nathaniel Cobb; Deering (R)	Rush Clark (R)	James B. Weaver (GB)	Edward H. Gillette (GB)	William Fletcher; Sapp (R)	Cyrus C. Carpenter (R)
46th (1879–1881)	Moses A. McCoid (R)	Hiram Price (R)	Thomas; Updegraff (R)	Nathaniel Cobb; Deering (R)	William George; Thompson (R)	James B. Weaver (GB)	Edward H. Gillette (GB)	William Fletcher; Sapp (R)	Cyrus C. Carpenter (R)
47th (1881–1883)	Moses A. McCoid (R)	Sewall S. Farwell (R)	Thomas; Updegraff (R)	Nathaniel Cobb; Deering (R)	William George; Thompson (R)	Marsena E. Cutts (R)	John A. Kasson (R)	William P. Hepburn (R)	Cyrus C. Carpenter (R)
47th (1881–1883)	Moses A. McCoid (R)	Sewall S. Farwell (R)	Thomas; Updegraff (R)	Nathaniel Cobb; Deering (R)	William George; Thompson (R)	John C. Cook (D)	John A. Kasson (R)	William P. Hepburn (R)	Cyrus C. Carpenter (R)

=== 1883–1933: 11 seats ===
Following the 1880 census, Iowa was apportioned 11 seats.

Congress	District										
Congress	1st	2nd	3rd	4th	5th	6th	7th	8th	9th	10th	11th
48th (1883–1885)	Moses A. McCoid (R)	Jeremiah; H. Murphy (D)	David B. Henderson (R)	Luman Hamlin; Weller (GB)	Jim Wilson (R)	Marsena E. Cutts (R)	John A. Kasson (R)	William P. Hepburn (R)	William H. M. Pusey (D)	Adoniram J. Holmes (R)	Isaac S. Struble (R)
48th (1883–1885)	Moses A. McCoid (R)	Jeremiah; H. Murphy (D)	David B. Henderson (R)	Luman Hamlin; Weller (GB)	Benjamin T. Frederick (D)	John Cook (D)	Hiram Smith (R)	William P. Hepburn (R)	William H. M. Pusey (D)	Adoniram J. Holmes (R)	Isaac S. Struble (R)
49th (1885–1887)	Ben Hall (D)	Jeremiah; H. Murphy (D)	David B. Henderson (R)	William E. Fuller (R)	Benjamin T. Frederick (D)	James B. Weaver (GB)	Edwin H. Conger (R)	William P. Hepburn (R)	Joseph; Lyman (R)	Adoniram J. Holmes (R)	Isaac S. Struble (R)
50th (1887–1889)	John H. Gear (R)	Walter I. Hayes (D)	David B. Henderson (R)	William E. Fuller (R)	Daniel Kerr (R)	James B. Weaver (GB)	Edwin H. Conger (R)	Albert R. Anderson (IR)	Joseph; Lyman (R)	Adoniram J. Holmes (R)	Isaac S. Struble (R)
51st (1889–1891)	John H. Gear (R)	Walter I. Hayes (D)	David B. Henderson (R)	Joseph Henry; Sweney (R)	Daniel Kerr (R)	John F. Lacey (R)	Edwin H. Conger (R)	James P. Flick (R)	Joseph Rea; Reed (R)	Jonathan P. Dolliver (R)	Isaac S. Struble (R)
51st (1889–1891)	John H. Gear (R)	Walter I. Hayes (D)	David B. Henderson (R)	Joseph Henry; Sweney (R)	Daniel Kerr (R)	John F. Lacey (R)	Edward Hays (R)	James P. Flick (R)	Joseph Rea; Reed (R)	Jonathan P. Dolliver (R)	Isaac S. Struble (R)
52nd (1891–1893)	John J. Seerley (D)	Walter I. Hayes (D)	David B. Henderson (R)	Walter H. Butler (D)	John Taylor; Hamilton (D)	Frederick E. White (D)	John A. T. Hull (R)	James P. Flick (R)	Thomas; Bowman (D)	Jonathan P. Dolliver (R)	George D. Perkins (R)
53rd (1893–1895)	John Gear (R)	Walter I. Hayes (D)	David B. Henderson (R)	Thomas; Updegraff (R)	Robert G. Cousins (R)	John F. Lacey (R)	John A. T. Hull (R)	William P. Hepburn (R)	Alva L. Hager (R)	Jonathan P. Dolliver (R)	George D. Perkins (R)
54th (1895–1897)	Samuel M. Clark (R)	George M. Curtis (R)	David B. Henderson (R)	Thomas; Updegraff (R)	Robert G. Cousins (R)	John F. Lacey (R)	John A. T. Hull (R)	William P. Hepburn (R)	Alva L. Hager (R)	Jonathan P. Dolliver (R)	George D. Perkins (R)
55th (1897–1899)	Samuel M. Clark (R)	George M. Curtis (R)	David B. Henderson (R)	Thomas; Updegraff (R)	Robert G. Cousins (R)	John F. Lacey (R)	John A. T. Hull (R)	William P. Hepburn (R)	Alva L. Hager (R)	Jonathan P. Dolliver (R)	George D. Perkins (R)
56th (1899–1901)	Thomas; Hedge (R)	Joe Lane (R)	David B. Henderson (R)	Gilbert N. Haugen (R)	Robert G. Cousins (R)	John F. Lacey (R)	John A. T. Hull (R)	William P. Hepburn (R)	Smith; McPherson (R)	Jonathan P. Dolliver (R)	Lot; Thomas (R)
56th (1899–1901)	Thomas; Hedge (R)	Joe Lane (R)	David B. Henderson (R)	Gilbert N. Haugen (R)	Robert G. Cousins (R)	John F. Lacey (R)	John A. T. Hull (R)	William P. Hepburn (R)	Walter I. Smith (R)	James P. Conner (R)	Lot; Thomas (R)
57th (1901–1903)	Thomas; Hedge (R)	John Rumple (R)	David B. Henderson (R)	Gilbert N. Haugen (R)	Robert G. Cousins (R)	John F. Lacey (R)	John A. T. Hull (R)	William P. Hepburn (R)	Walter I. Smith (R)	James P. Conner (R)	Lot; Thomas (R)
58th (1903–1905)	Thomas; Hedge (R)	Martin Wade (D)	Benjamin P. Birdsall (R)	Gilbert N. Haugen (R)	Robert G. Cousins (R)	John F. Lacey (R)	John A. T. Hull (R)	William P. Hepburn (R)	Walter I. Smith (R)	James P. Conner (R)	Lot; Thomas (R)
59th (1905–1907)	Thomas; Hedge (R)	Albert F. Dawson (R)	Benjamin P. Birdsall (R)	Gilbert N. Haugen (R)	Robert G. Cousins (R)	John F. Lacey (R)	John A. T. Hull (R)	William P. Hepburn (R)	Walter I. Smith (R)	James P. Conner (R)	Elbert H. Hubbard (R)
60th (1907–1909)	Charles A. Kennedy (R)	Albert F. Dawson (R)	Benjamin P. Birdsall (R)	Gilbert N. Haugen (R)	Robert G. Cousins (R)	Daniel W. Hamilton (D)	John A. T. Hull (R)	William P. Hepburn (R)	Walter I. Smith (R)	James P. Conner (R)	Elbert H. Hubbard (R)
61st (1909–1911)	Charles A. Kennedy (R)	Albert F. Dawson (R)	Charles E. Pickett (R)	Gilbert N. Haugen (R)	James W. Good (R)	Nathan E. Kendall (R)	John A. T. Hull (R)	William Darius; Jamieson (D)	Walter I. Smith (R)	Frank P. Woods (R)	Elbert H. Hubbard (R)
62nd (1911–1913)	Charles A. Kennedy (R)	Irvin S. Pepper (D)	Charles E. Pickett (R)	Gilbert N. Haugen (R)	James W. Good (R)	Nathan E. Kendall (R)	Solomon F. Prouty (R)	Horace M. Towner (R)	Walter I. Smith (R)	Frank P. Woods (R)	Elbert H. Hubbard (R)
62nd (1911–1913)	Charles A. Kennedy (R)	Irvin S. Pepper (D)	Charles E. Pickett (R)	Gilbert N. Haugen (R)	James W. Good (R)	Nathan E. Kendall (R)	Solomon F. Prouty (R)	Horace M. Towner (R)	William R. Green (R)	Frank P. Woods (R)	George C. Scott (R)
63rd (1913–1915)	Charles A. Kennedy (R)	Irvin S. Pepper (D)	Maurice; Connolly (D)	Gilbert N. Haugen (R)	James W. Good (R)	Sanford; Kirkpatrick (D)	Solomon F. Prouty (R)	Horace M. Towner (R)	William R. Green (R)	Frank P. Woods (R)	George C. Scott (R)
63rd (1913–1915)	Charles A. Kennedy (R)	Henry Vollmer (D)	Maurice; Connolly (D)	Gilbert N. Haugen (R)	James W. Good (R)	Sanford; Kirkpatrick (D)	Solomon F. Prouty (R)	Horace M. Towner (R)	William R. Green (R)	Frank P. Woods (R)	George C. Scott (R)
64th (1915–1917)	Charles A. Kennedy (R)	Harry E. Hull (R)	Burton E. Sweet (R)	Gilbert N. Haugen (R)	James W. Good (R)	C. William; Ramseyer (R)	Cassius C. Dowell (R)	Horace M. Towner (R)	William R. Green (R)	Frank P. Woods (R)	Thomas J. Steele (D)
65th (1917–1919)	Charles A. Kennedy (R)	Harry E. Hull (R)	Burton E. Sweet (R)	Gilbert N. Haugen (R)	James W. Good (R)	C. William; Ramseyer (R)	Cassius C. Dowell (R)	Horace M. Towner (R)	William R. Green (R)	Frank P. Woods (R)	George C. Scott (R)
66th (1919–1921)	Charles A. Kennedy (R)	Harry E. Hull (R)	Burton E. Sweet (R)	Gilbert N. Haugen (R)	James W. Good (R)	C. William; Ramseyer (R)	Cassius C. Dowell (R)	Horace M. Towner (R)	William R. Green (R)	L. J. Dickinson (R)	William D. Boies (R)
67th (1921–1923)	William F. Kopp (R)	Harry E. Hull (R)	Burton E. Sweet (R)	Gilbert N. Haugen (R)	James W. Good (R)	C. William; Ramseyer (R)	Cassius C. Dowell (R)	Horace M. Towner (R)	William R. Green (R)	L. J. Dickinson (R)	William D. Boies (R)
67th (1921–1923)	William F. Kopp (R)	Harry E. Hull (R)	Burton E. Sweet (R)	Gilbert N. Haugen (R)	Cyrenus; Cole (R)	C. William; Ramseyer (R)	Cassius C. Dowell (R)	Horace M. Towner (R)	William R. Green (R)	L. J. Dickinson (R)	William D. Boies (R)
68th (1923–1925)	William F. Kopp (R)	Harry E. Hull (R)	Thomas J. B. Robinson (R)	Gilbert N. Haugen (R)	Cyrenus; Cole (R)	C. William; Ramseyer (R)	Cassius C. Dowell (R)	Horace M. Towner (R)	William R. Green (R)	L. J. Dickinson (R)	William D. Boies (R)
68th (1923–1925)	William F. Kopp (R)	Harry E. Hull (R)	Thomas J. B. Robinson (R)	Gilbert N. Haugen (R)	Cyrenus; Cole (R)	C. William; Ramseyer (R)	Cassius C. Dowell (R)	Hiram Evans (R)	William R. Green (R)	L. J. Dickinson (R)	William D. Boies (R)
69th (1925–1927)	William F. Kopp (R)	F. Dickinson; Letts (R)	Thomas J. B. Robinson (R)	Gilbert N. Haugen (R)	Cyrenus; Cole (R)	C. William; Ramseyer (R)	Cassius C. Dowell (R)	Lloyd; Thurston (R)	William R. Green (R)	L. J. Dickinson (R)	William D. Boies (R)
70th (1927–1929)	William F. Kopp (R)	F. Dickinson; Letts (R)	Thomas J. B. Robinson (R)	Gilbert N. Haugen (R)	Cyrenus; Cole (R)	C. William; Ramseyer (R)	Cassius C. Dowell (R)	Lloyd; Thurston (R)	William R. Green (R)	L. J. Dickinson (R)	William D. Boies (R)
70th (1927–1929)	William F. Kopp (R)	F. Dickinson; Letts (R)	Thomas J. B. Robinson (R)	Gilbert N. Haugen (R)	Cyrenus; Cole (R)	C. William; Ramseyer (R)	Cassius C. Dowell (R)	Lloyd; Thurston (R)	Earl Vincent (R)	L. J. Dickinson (R)	William D. Boies (R)
71st (1929–1931)	William F. Kopp (R)	F. Dickinson; Letts (R)	Thomas J. B. Robinson (R)	Gilbert N. Haugen (R)	Cyrenus; Cole (R)	C. William; Ramseyer (R)	Cassius C. Dowell (R)	Lloyd; Thurston (R)	Charles E. Swanson (R)	L. J. Dickinson (R)	Ed H. Campbell (R)
72nd (1931–1933)	William F. Kopp (R)	Bernhard M. Jacobsen (D)	Thomas J. B. Robinson (R)	Gilbert N. Haugen (R)	Cyrenus; Cole (R)	C. William; Ramseyer (R)	Cassius C. Dowell (R)	Lloyd; Thurston (R)	Charles E. Swanson (R)	Fred C. Gilchrist (R)	Ed H. Campbell (R)

=== 1933–1943: 9 seats ===
Following the 1930 census, Iowa was apportioned 9 seats.

Congress	District								
Congress	1st	2nd	3rd	4th	5th	6th	7th	8th	9th
73rd (1933–1935)	Edward C. Eicher (D)	Bernhard M. Jacobsen (D)	Albert Willford (D)	Fred; Biermann (D)	Lloyd; Thurston (R)	Cassius C. Dowell (R)	Otha; Wearin (D)	Fred C. Gilchrist (R)	Guy Gillette (D)
74th (1935–1937)	Edward C. Eicher (D)	Bernhard M. Jacobsen (D)	John W. Gwynne (R)	Fred; Biermann (D)	Lloyd; Thurston (R)	Hubert Utterback (D)	Otha; Wearin (D)	Fred C. Gilchrist (R)	Guy Gillette (D)
75th (1937–1939)	Edward C. Eicher (D)	William S. Jacobsen (D)	John W. Gwynne (R)	Fred; Biermann (D)	Lloyd; Thurston (R)	Cassius C. Dowell (R)	Otha; Wearin (D)	Fred C. Gilchrist (R)	Vincent F. Harrington (D)
76th (1939–1941)	Thomas E. Martin (R)	William S. Jacobsen (D)	John W. Gwynne (R)	Henry O. Talle (R)	Karl M. LeCompte (R)	Cassius C. Dowell (R)	Ben F. Jensen (R)	Fred C. Gilchrist (R)	Vincent F. Harrington (D)
77th (1941–1943)	Thomas E. Martin (R)	William S. Jacobsen (D)	John W. Gwynne (R)	Henry O. Talle (R)	Karl M. LeCompte (R)	Paul; Cunningham (R)	Ben F. Jensen (R)	Fred C. Gilchrist (R)	Vincent F. Harrington (D)
77th (1941–1943)	Thomas E. Martin (R)	William S. Jacobsen (D)	John W. Gwynne (R)	Henry O. Talle (R)	Karl M. LeCompte (R)	Paul; Cunningham (R)	Ben F. Jensen (R)	Fred C. Gilchrist (R)	Harry Narey (R)

=== 1943–1963: 8 seats ===
Following the 1940 census, Iowa was apportioned 8 seats.

Congress	District							
Congress	1st	2nd	3rd	4th	5th	6th	7th	8th
78th (1943–1945)	Thomas E. Martin (R)	Henry O. Talle (R)	John W. Gwynne (R)	Karl M. LeCompte (R)	Paul; Cunningham (R)	Fred C. Gilchrist (R)	Ben F. Jensen (R)	Charles B. Hoeven (R)
79th (1945–1947)	Thomas E. Martin (R)	Henry O. Talle (R)	John W. Gwynne (R)	Karl M. LeCompte (R)	Paul; Cunningham (R)	James I. Dolliver (R)	Ben F. Jensen (R)	Charles B. Hoeven (R)
80th (1947–1949)	Thomas E. Martin (R)	Henry O. Talle (R)	John W. Gwynne (R)	Karl M. LeCompte (R)	Paul; Cunningham (R)	James I. Dolliver (R)	Ben F. Jensen (R)	Charles B. Hoeven (R)
81st (1949–1951)	Thomas E. Martin (R)	Henry O. Talle (R)	H. R. Gross (R)	Karl M. LeCompte (R)	Paul; Cunningham (R)	James I. Dolliver (R)	Ben F. Jensen (R)	Charles B. Hoeven (R)
82nd (1951–1953)	Thomas E. Martin (R)	Henry O. Talle (R)	H. R. Gross (R)	Karl M. LeCompte (R)	Paul; Cunningham (R)	James I. Dolliver (R)	Ben F. Jensen (R)	Charles B. Hoeven (R)
83rd (1953–1955)	Thomas E. Martin (R)	Henry O. Talle (R)	H. R. Gross (R)	Karl M. LeCompte (R)	Paul; Cunningham (R)	James I. Dolliver (R)	Ben F. Jensen (R)	Charles B. Hoeven (R)
84th (1955–1957)	Fred; Schwengel (R)	Henry O. Talle (R)	H. R. Gross (R)	Karl M. LeCompte (R)	Paul; Cunningham (R)	James I. Dolliver (R)	Ben F. Jensen (R)	Charles B. Hoeven (R)
85th (1957–1959)	Fred; Schwengel (R)	Henry O. Talle (R)	H. R. Gross (R)	Karl M. LeCompte (R)	Paul; Cunningham (R)	Merwin; Coad (D)	Ben F. Jensen (R)	Charles B. Hoeven (R)
86th (1959–1961)	Fred; Schwengel (R)	Leonard G. Wolf (D)	H. R. Gross (R)	Steven V. Carter (D)	Neal; Smith (D)	Merwin; Coad (D)	Ben F. Jensen (R)	Charles B. Hoeven (R)
87th (1961–1963)	Fred; Schwengel (R)	James E. Bromwell (R)	H. R. Gross (R)	John Henry; Kyl (R)	Neal; Smith (D)	Merwin; Coad (D)	Ben F. Jensen (R)	Charles B. Hoeven (R)

=== 1963–1973: 7 seats ===
Following the 1960 census, Iowa was apportioned 7 seats.

Congress	District						
Congress	1st	2nd	3rd	4th	5th	6th	7th
88th (1963–1965)	Fred; Schwengel (R)	James E. Bromwell (R)	H. R. Gross (R)	John Henry; Kyl (R)	Neal; Smith (D)	Charles B. Hoeven (R)	Ben F. Jensen (R)
89th (1965–1967)	John R. Schmidhauser (D)	John; Culver (D)	H. R. Gross (R)	Bert; Bandstra (D)	Neal; Smith (D)	Stanley L. Greigg (D)	John R. Hansen (D)
90th (1967–1969)	Fred; Schwengel (R)	John; Culver (D)	H. R. Gross (R)	John Henry; Kyl (R)	Neal; Smith (D)	Wiley; Mayne (R)	William J. Scherle (R)
91st (1969–1971)	Fred; Schwengel (R)	John; Culver (D)	H. R. Gross (R)	John Henry; Kyl (R)	Neal; Smith (D)	Wiley; Mayne (R)	William J. Scherle (R)
92nd (1971–1973)	Fred; Schwengel (R)	John; Culver (D)	H. R. Gross (R)	John Henry; Kyl (R)	Neal; Smith (D)	Wiley; Mayne (R)	William J. Scherle (R)

=== 1973–1993: 6 seats ===
Following the 1970 census, Iowa was apportioned 6 seats.

Congress	1st district	2nd district	3rd district	4th district	5th district	6th district
93rd (1973–1975)	Edward; Mezvinsky (D)	John Culver (D)	H. R. Gross (R)	Neal; Smith (D)	William Scherle (R)	Wiley Mayne (R)
94th (1975–1977)	Edward; Mezvinsky (D)	Mike Blouin (D)	Chuck; Grassley (R)	Neal; Smith (D)	Tom Harkin (D)	Berkley; Bedell (D)
95th (1977–1979)	Jim Leach (R)	Mike Blouin (D)	Chuck; Grassley (R)	Neal; Smith (D)	Tom Harkin (D)	Berkley; Bedell (D)
96th (1979–1981)	Jim Leach (R)	Tom Tauke (R)	Chuck; Grassley (R)	Neal; Smith (D)	Tom Harkin (D)	Berkley; Bedell (D)
97th (1981–1983)	Jim Leach (R)	Tom Tauke (R)	T. Cooper; Evans (R)	Neal; Smith (D)	Tom Harkin (D)	Berkley; Bedell (D)
98th (1983–1985)	Jim Leach (R)	Tom Tauke (R)	T. Cooper; Evans (R)	Neal; Smith (D)	Tom Harkin (D)	Berkley; Bedell (D)
99th (1985–1987)	Jim Leach (R)	Tom Tauke (R)	T. Cooper; Evans (R)	Neal; Smith (D)	Jim Ross; Lightfoot (R)	Berkley; Bedell (D)
100th (1987–1989)	Jim Leach (R)	Tom Tauke (R)	Dave; Nagle (D)	Neal; Smith (D)	Jim Ross; Lightfoot (R)	Fred Grandy (R)
101st (1989–1991)	Jim Leach (R)	Tom Tauke (R)	Dave; Nagle (D)	Neal; Smith (D)	Jim Ross; Lightfoot (R)	Fred Grandy (R)
102nd (1991–1993)	Jim Leach (R)	Jim Nussle (R)	Dave; Nagle (D)	Neal; Smith (D)	Jim Ross; Lightfoot (R)	Fred Grandy (R)

=== 1993–2013: 5 seats ===
Following the 1990 census, Iowa was apportioned 5 seats.

Congress	1st district	2nd district	3rd district	4th district	5th district
103rd (1993–1995)	Jim Leach (R)	Jim Nussle (R)	Jim Ross; Lightfoot (R)	Neal Smith (D)	Fred Grandy (R)
104th (1995–1997)	Jim Leach (R)	Jim Nussle (R)	Jim Ross; Lightfoot (R)	Greg Ganske (R)	Tom Latham (R)
105th (1997–1999)	Jim Leach (R)	Jim Nussle (R)	Leonard; Boswell (D)	Greg Ganske (R)	Tom Latham (R)
106th (1999–2001)	Jim Leach (R)	Jim Nussle (R)	Leonard; Boswell (D)	Greg Ganske (R)	Tom Latham (R)
107th (2001–2003)	Jim Leach (R)	Jim Nussle (R)	Leonard; Boswell (D)	Greg Ganske (R)	Tom Latham (R)
108th (2003–2005)	Jim Nussle (R)	Jim Leach (R)	Leonard; Boswell (D)	Tom Latham (R)	Steve King (R)
109th (2005–2007)	Jim Nussle (R)	Jim Leach (R)	Leonard; Boswell (D)	Tom Latham (R)	Steve King (R)
110th (2007–2009)	Bruce Braley (D)	Dave; Loebsack (D)	Leonard; Boswell (D)	Tom Latham (R)	Steve King (R)
111th (2009–2011)	Bruce Braley (D)	Dave; Loebsack (D)	Leonard; Boswell (D)	Tom Latham (R)	Steve King (R)
112th (2011–2013)	Bruce Braley (D)	Dave; Loebsack (D)	Leonard; Boswell (D)	Tom Latham (R)	Steve King (R)

=== 2013–present: 4 seats ===
Following the 2010 census, Iowa was apportioned 4 seats.

Congress	1st district	2nd district	3rd district	4th district
113th (2013–2015)	Bruce Braley (D)	Dave; Loebsack (D)	Tom Latham (R)	Steve King (R)
114th (2015–2017)	Rod Blum (R)	Dave; Loebsack (D)	David Young (R)	Steve King (R)
115th (2017–2019)	Rod Blum (R)	Dave; Loebsack (D)	David Young (R)	Steve King (R)
116th (2019–2021)	Abby Finkenauer (D)	Dave; Loebsack (D)	Cindy Axne (D)	Steve King (R)
117th (2021–2023)	Ashley Hinson (R)	Mariannette; Miller-Meeks (R)	Cindy Axne (D)	Randy Feenstra (R)
118th (2023–2025)	Mariannette; Miller-Meeks (R)	Ashley Hinson (R)	Zach Nunn (R)	Randy Feenstra (R)
119th (2025–2027)	Mariannette; Miller-Meeks (R)	Ashley Hinson (R)	Zach Nunn (R)	Randy Feenstra (R)
120th (2027–2029)	Christina Bohannan (D)	Lindsay James (D)	Sarah Trone Garriott (D)	Chris McGowan (R)

== Key ==
Democratic (D)
Greenback (GB)
Republican (R)
Whig (W)

== See also ==
- List of United States congressional districts
- Iowa's congressional districts
- Political party strength in Iowa
