= List of United States representatives from Iowa =

The following is an alphabetical list of United States representatives from the state of Iowa. For chronological tables of members of both houses of the United States Congress from the state (through the present day), see Iowa's congressional delegations. The list of names should be complete, but other data may be incomplete.

== Current members ==
Updated January 3, 2025.

- 1st district: Mariannette Miller-Meeks (R, since 2021)
- 2nd district: Ashley Hinson (R, since 2021)
- 3rd district: Zach Nunn (R, since 2023)
- 4th district: Randy Feenstra (R, since 2021)

== List of members and delegates ==
Member / Delegate	Years	Party	District	Electoral history
Lucien Lester Ainsworth	March 4, 1875 – March 3, 1877	Democratic	3rd	Elected in 1874. Retired.
William B. Allison	March 4, 1863 – March 3, 1871	Republican	3rd	Elected in 1862. Retired to run for U.S. senator.
Albert R. Anderson	March 4, 1887 – March 3, 1889	Independent Republican	8th	Elected in 1886. Lost re-election to Flick.
Cindy Axne	January 3, 2019 – January 3, 2023	Democratic	3rd	Elected in 2018. Lost re-election to Nunn.
Bert Bandstra	January 3, 1965 – January 3, 1967	Democratic	4th	Elected in 1964. Lost re-election to Kyl.
Berkley Bedell	January 3, 1975 – January 3, 1987	Democratic	6th	Elected in 1974. Retired.
Fred Biermann	March 4, 1933 – January 3, 1939	Democratic	4th	Elected in 1932. Lost re-election to Talle.
Benjamin P. Birdsall	March 4, 1903 – March 3, 1909	Republican	3rd	Elected in 1902. Retired.
Mike Blouin	January 3, 1975 – January 3, 1979	Democratic	2nd	Elected in 1974. Lost re-election to Tauke.
Rod Blum	January 3, 2015 – January 3, 2019	Republican	1st	Elected in 2014. Lost re-election to Finkenauer.
William D. Boies	March 4, 1919 – March 3, 1929	Republican	11th	Elected in 1918. Retired.
Leonard Boswell	January 3, 1997 – January 3, 2013	Democratic	3rd	Elected in 1996. Lost re-election to Latham.
Thomas Bowman	March 4, 1891 – March 3, 1893	Democratic	9th	Elected in 1890. Retired.
Bruce Braley	January 3, 2007 – January 3, 2015	Democratic	1st	Elected in 2006. Retired to run for U.S. senator.
James E. Bromwell	January 3, 1961 – January 3, 1965	Republican	2nd	Elected in 1960. Lost re-election to Culver.
Theodore W. Burdick	March 4, 1877 – March 3, 1879	Republican	3rd	Elected in 1876. Retired.
Walter H. Butler	March 4, 1891 – March 3, 1893	Democratic	4th	Elected in 1890. Lost re-election to Updegraff.
Ed H. Campbell	March 4, 1929 – March 3, 1933	Republican	11th	Elected in 1928. Redistricted to the 9th district and lost re-election to G. Gillette.
Cyrus C. Carpenter	March 4, 1879 – March 3, 1883	Republican	9th	Elected in 1878. Retired.
Steven V. Carter	January 3, 1959 – November 4, 1959	Democratic	4th	Elected in 1958. Died.
William W. Chapman	September 10, 1838 – October 27, 1840	Democratic	Territory	Elected in 1838. Term expired per act of Congress.
Lincoln Clark	March 4, 1851 – March 3, 1853	Democratic	2nd	Elected in 1850. Lost re-election to J.P. Cook.
Rush Clark	March 4, 1877 – April 29, 1879	Republican	5th	Elected in 1876. Died.
Samuel M. Clark	March 4, 1895 – March 3, 1899	Republican	1st	Elected in 1894. Retired.
Merwin Coad	January 3, 1957 – January 3, 1963	Democratic	6th	Elected in 1956. Retired.
Cyrenus Cole	August 1, 1921 – March 3, 1933	Republican	5th	Elected to finish Good's term. Redistricted to 2nd district but retired.
Edwin H. Conger	March 4, 1885 – October 3, 1890	Republican	7th	Elected in 1884. Resigned after being appointed U.S. Ambassador to Brazil.
James P. Conner	December 4, 1900 – March 3, 1909	Republican	10th	Elected in 1900. Lost renomination to Woods.
Maurice Connolly	March 4, 1913 – March 3, 1915	Democratic	3rd	Elected in 1912. Retired to run for U.S. senator.
John C. Cook	March 3, 1883 – March 3, 1883	Democratic	6th	Won contested election. Lost re-election to Cutts.
John C. Cook	October 9, 1883 – March 3, 1885	Democratic	6th	Elected to finish Cutts's term. Lost re-election to Weaver.
John P. Cook	March 4, 1853 – March 3, 1855	Whig	2nd	Elected in 1852. Retired.
Aylett R. Cotton	March 4, 1871 – March 3, 1875	Republican	2nd	Elected in 1870. Lost renomination. (Note: Although his official Congressional biography states he declined to run for a third term, newspaper reports indicate that he was an active but unsuccessful candidate for renomination)
Robert G. Cousins	March 4, 1893 – March 3, 1909	Republican	5th	Elected in 1892. Retired.
John Culver	January 3, 1965 – January 3, 1975	Democratic	2nd	Elected in 1964. Retired to run for U.S. senator.
Henry J. B. Cummings	March 4, 1877 – March 3, 1879	Republican	7th	Elected in 1876. Lost re-election to E. Gillette.
Paul H. Cunningham	January 3, 1941 – January 3, 1943	Republican	6th	Elected in 1940. Redistricted to the 5th district.
Paul H. Cunningham	January 3, 1943 – January 3, 1959	Republican	5th	Redistricted from the 6th district and re-elected in 1942. Lost re-election to N. Smith.
George M. Curtis	March 4, 1895 – March 3, 1899	Republican	2nd	Elected in 1894. Retired.
Samuel Curtis	March 4, 1857 – August 4, 1861	Republican	1st	Elected in 1856. Resigned to serve in the Civil War.
Marsena E. Cutts	March 4, 1881 – March 3, 1883	Republican	6th	Elected in 1880. Lost contested election to Cook.
Marsena E. Cutts	March 4, 1883 – September 1, 1883	Republican	6th	Elected in 1882. Died.
Timothy Davis	March 4, 1857 – March 3, 1859	Republican	2nd	Elected in 1856. Retired.
Albert F. Dawson	March 4, 1905 – March 3, 1911	Republican	2nd	Elected in 1904. Retired.
Nathaniel C. Deering	March 4, 1877 – March 3, 1883	Republican	4th	Elected in 1876. Retired.
Lester J. Dickinson	March 4, 1919 – March 3, 1931	Republican	10th	Elected in 1918. Retired to run for U.S. senator.
Augustus C. Dodge	October 28, 1840 – December 28, 1846	Democratic	Territory	Elected in 1840. Seat eliminated when statehood achieved.
Grenville M. Dodge	March 4, 1867 – March 3, 1869	Republican	5th	Elected in 1866. Retired.
James I. Dolliver	January 3, 1945 – January 3, 1957	Republican	6th	Elected in 1944. Lost re-election to Coad.
Jonathan P. Dolliver	March 4, 1889 – August 22, 1900	Republican	10th	Elected in 1888. Resigned after being appointed to the U.S. Senate.
William G. Donnan	March 4, 1871 – March 3, 1875	Republican	3rd	Elected in 1870. Retired.
Cassius C. Dowell	March 4, 1915 – March 3, 1933	Republican	7th	Elected in 1914. Redistricted to the 6th district.
Cassius C. Dowell	March 4, 1933 – January 3, 1935	Republican	6th	Redistricted from the 7th district and re-elected in 1932. Lost re-election to Utterback.
Cassius C. Dowell	January 3, 1937 – February 4, 1940	Republican	6th	Elected in 1936. Died.
Edward C. Eicher	March 4, 1933 – December 2, 1938	Democratic	1st	Re-elected in 1932. Renominated but resigned to become commissioner of the Securities and Exchange Commission.
Hiram Kinsman Evans	June 4, 1923 – March 3, 1925	Republican	8th	Elected to finish Towner's term. Retired.
T. Cooper Evans	January 3, 1981 – January 3, 1987	Republican	3rd	Elected in 1980. Retired.
Sewall S. Farwell	March 4, 1881 – March 3, 1883	Republican	2nd	Elected in 1880. Lost re-election to Murphy.
Randy Feenstra	January 3, 2021 – present	Republican	4th	Elected in 2020.
Abby Finkenauer	January 3, 2019 – January 3, 2021	Democratic	1st	Elected in 2018. Lost re-election to Hinson.
James P. Flick	March 4, 1889 – March 3, 1893	Republican	8th	Elected in 1888. Retired.
Benjamin T. Frederick	March 4, 1885 – March 3, 1887	Democratic	5th	Won contested election. (Note: The resolution of the contest was delayed until the final hours of the Forty-eighth Congress, so Frederick was not declared winner until March 4, 1885.); Lost re-election to Kerr.
William E. Fuller	March 4, 1885 – March 3, 1889	Republican	4th	Elected in 1884. Lost renomination to Sweney.
Greg Ganske	January 3, 1995 – January 3, 2003	Republican	4th	Elected in 1994. Redistricted to the 3rd district but retired to run for U.S. senator.
John H. Gear	March 4, 1887 – March 3, 1891	Republican	1st	Elected in 1886. Lost re-election to Seerley.
John H. Gear	March 4, 1893 – March 3, 1895	Republican	1st	Elected in 1892. Retired to run for U.S. Senator.
Fred C. Gilchrist	March 4, 1931 – March 3, 1933	Republican	10th	Elected in 1930. Redistricted to the 8th district.
Fred C. Gilchrist	March 4, 1933 – January 3, 1943	Republican	8th	Redistricted from the 10th district and re-elected in 1932. Redistricted to the 6th district.
Fred C. Gilchrist	January 3, 1943 – January 3, 1945	Republican	6th	Redistricted from the 8th district and re-elected in 1942. Lost renomination to J.I. Dolliver.
Edward H. Gillette	March 4, 1879 – March 3, 1881	Greenback	7th	Elected in 1878. Lost re-election to Kasson.
Guy Mark Gillette	March 4, 1933 – November 3, 1936	Democratic	9th	Elected in 1932. Retired to run for U.S. senator and resigned when elected.
James William Good	March 4, 1909 – June 15, 1921	Republican	5th	Elected in 1908. Resigned.
Robert K. Goodwin	March 5, 1940 – January 3, 1941	Republican	6th	Elected to finish Dowell's term. Retired.
Fred Grandy	January 3, 1987 – January 3, 1993	Republican	6th	Elected in 1986. Redistricted to the 5th district.
Fred Grandy	January 3, 1993 – January 3, 1995	Republican	5th	Redistricted from the 6th district and re-elected in 1992. Retired to run for governor.
Chuck Grassley	January 3, 1975 – January 3, 1981	Republican	3rd	Elected in 1974. Retired to run for U.S. senator.
William R. Green	June 5, 1911 – March 31, 1928	Republican	9th	Elected to finish Smith's term. Resigned after being appointed a judge of the United States Court of Claims.
Stanley L. Greigg	January 3, 1965 – January 3, 1967	Democratic	6th	Elected in 1964. Lost re-election to Mayne.
Josiah B. Grinnell	March 4, 1863 – March 3, 1867	Republican	4th	Elected in 1862. Lost renomination to Loughridge.
Harold R. Gross	January 3, 1949 – January 3, 1975	Republican	3rd	Elected in 1948. Retired.
John W. Gwynne	January 3, 1935 – January 3, 1949	Republican	3rd	Elected in 1934. Lost renomination to Gross.
Alva L. Hager	March 4, 1893 – March 3, 1899	Republican	9th	Elected in 1892. Lost renomination to McPherson.
Augustus Hall	March 4, 1855 – March 3, 1857	Democratic	1st	Elected in 1854. Lost re-election to S. Curtis.
Benton J. Hall	March 4, 1885 – March 3, 1887	Democratic	1st	Elected in 1884. Lost re-election to Gear.
Daniel W. Hamilton	March 4, 1907 – March 3, 1909	Democratic	6th	Elected in 1906. Lost re-election to Kendall.
John Taylor Hamilton	March 4, 1891 – March 3, 1893	Democratic	5th	Elected in 1890. Lost re-election to Cousins.
John R. Hansen	January 3, 1965 – January 3, 1967	Democratic	7th	Elected in 1964. Lost re-election to Scherle.
Tom Harkin	January 3, 1975 – January 3, 1985	Democratic	5th	Elected in 1974. Retired to run for U.S. senator.
Vincent F. Harrington	March 4, 1937 – September 5, 1942	Democratic	9th	Elected in 1936. Resigned to accept commission in the US Army.
S. Clinton Hastings	December 29, 1846 – March 3, 1847	Democratic	At-large	Elected in 1846. Retired.
Gilbert N. Haugen	March 4, 1899 – March 3, 1933	Republican	4th	Elected in 1898. Lost re-election to Biermann.
Walter I. Hayes	March 4, 1887 – March 3, 1895	Democratic	2nd	Elected in 1886. Lost re-election to G. Curtis.
Edward R. Hays	November 4, 1890 – March 3, 1891	Republican	7th	Elected to finish Conger's term. Retired.
Thomas Hedge	March 4, 1899 – March 3, 1907	Republican	1st	Elected in 1898. Retired.
David B. Henderson	March 4, 1883 – March 3, 1903	Republican	3rd	Elected in 1882. Renominated but withdrew prior to election.
Bernhart Henn	March 4, 1851 – March 3, 1855	Democratic	1st	Elected in 1850. Retired to run for U.S. senator.
William P. Hepburn	March 4, 1881 – March 3, 1887	Republican	8th	Elected in 1880. Lost re-election to Anderson.
William P. Hepburn	March 4, 1893 – March 3, 1909	Republican	8th	Elected in 1892. Lost re-election to Jamieson.
Ashley Hinson	January 3, 2021 – January 3, 2023	Republican	1st	Elected in 2020. Redistricted to the 2nd district.
Ashley Hinson	January 3, 2023 – present	Republican	2nd	Redistricted from the 1st district and re-elected in 2022.
Charles B. Hoeven	January 3, 1943 – January 3, 1963	Republican	8th	Elected in 1942. Redistricted to the 6th district.
Charles B. Hoeven	January 3, 1963 – January 3, 1965	Republican	6th	Redistricted from the 8th district and re-elected in 1962. Retired.
Adoniram J. Holmes	March 4, 1883 – March 3, 1889	Republican	10th	Elected in 1882. Lost renomination to J.P. Dolliver.
Asahel W. Hubbard	March 4, 1863 – March 3, 1869	Republican	6th	Elected in 1862. Retired.
Elbert H. Hubbard	March 4, 1905 – June 4, 1912	Republican	11th	Elected in 1904. Died.
Harry E. Hull	March 4, 1915 – March 3, 1925	Republican	2nd	Elected in 1914. Lost renomination to Letts.
John A. T. Hull	March 4, 1891 – March 3, 1911	Republican	7th	Elected in 1890. Lost renomination to Prouty.
Bernhard M. Jacobsen	March 4, 1931 – June 30, 1936	Democratic	2nd	Elected in 1930. Died.
William S. Jacobsen	January 3, 1937 – January 3, 1943	Democratic	2nd	Elected in 1936. Lost re-election to Talle.
William Darius Jamieson	March 4, 1909 – March 3, 1911	Democratic	8th	Elected in 1908. Retired.
Ben F. Jensen	January 3, 1939 – January 3, 1965	Republican	7th	Elected in 1938. Lost re-election to Hansen.
John A. Kasson	March 4, 1863 – March 3, 1867	Republican	5th	Elected in 1862. Lost renomination to G. Dodge.
John A. Kasson	March 4, 1873 – March 3, 1877	Republican	7th	Elected in 1872. Retired.
John A. Kasson	March 4, 1881 – July 31, 1884	Republican	7th	Elected in 1880. Resigned after being appointed United States Ambassador to Germany.
Nathan E. Kendall	March 4, 1909 – March 3, 1913	Republican	6th	Elected in 1908. Renominated but withdrew prior to election.
Charles A. Kennedy	March 4, 1907 – March 3, 1921	Republican	1st	Elected in 1906. Retired.
Daniel Kerr	March 4, 1887 – March 3, 1891	Republican	5th	Elected in 1886. Retired.
Steve King	January 3, 2003 – January 3, 2013	Republican	5th	Elected in 2002. Redistricted to the 4th district.
Steve King	January 3, 2013 – January 3, 2021	Republican	4th	Redistricted from the 5th district and re-elected in 2012. Lost renomination to Feenstra.
Sanford Kirkpatrick	March 4, 1913 – March 3, 1915	Democratic	6th	Elected in 1912. Lost renomination to Ramseyer.
William F. Kopp	March 4, 1921 – March 3, 1933	Republican	1st	Elected in 1920. Lost re-election to Eicher.
John Kyl	December 15, 1959 – January 3, 1965	Republican	4th	Elected to finish Carter's term. Lost re-election to Bandstra.
John Kyl	January 3, 1967 – January 3, 1973	Republican	4th	Elected in 1966. Lost re-election to N. Smith.
John F. Lacey	March 4, 1889 – March 3, 1891	Republican	6th	Elected in 1888. Lost re-election to White.
John F. Lacey	March 4, 1893 – March 3, 1907	Republican	6th	Elected in 1892. Lost re-election to D. Hamilton.
Joseph R. Lane	March 4, 1899 – March 3, 1901	Republican	2nd	Elected in 1898. Retired.
Tom Latham	January 3, 1995 – January 3, 2003	Republican	5th	Elected in 1994. Redistricted to the 4th district.
Tom Latham	January 3, 2003 – January 3, 2013	Republican	4th	Redistricted from the 5th district and re-elected in 2002. Redistricted to the 3rd district.
Tom Latham	January 3, 2013 – January 3, 2015	Republican	3rd	Redistricted from the 4th district and re-elected in 2012. Retired.
Jim Leach	January 3, 1977 – January 3, 2003	Republican	1st	Elected in 1976. Redistricted to the 2nd district.
Jim Leach	January 3, 2003 – January 3, 2007	Republican	2nd	Redistricted from the 1st district and re-elected in 2002. Lost re-election to Loebsack.
Karl M. LeCompte	January 3, 1939 – January 3, 1943	Republican	5th	Elected in 1938. Redistricted to the 4th district.
Karl M. LeCompte	January 3, 1943 – January 3, 1959	Republican	4th	Redistricted from the 5th district and re-elected in 1942. Retired.
Shepherd Leffler	December 28, 1846 – March 3, 1847	Democratic	At-large	Elected in 1846. Redistricted to the 2nd district.
Shepherd Leffler	March 4, 1847 – March 3, 1851	Democratic	2nd	Redistricted from the at-large district and re-elected in 1846. Retired.
F. Dickinson Letts	March 4, 1925 – March 3, 1931	Republican	2nd	Elected in 1924. Lost re-election to B. Jacobsen.
Jim Ross Lightfoot	January 3, 1985 – January 3, 1993	Republican	5th	Elected in 1984. Redistricted to the 3rd district.
Jim Ross Lightfoot	January 3, 1993 – January 3, 1997	Republican	3rd	Redistricted from the 5th district and re-elected in 1992. Retired to run for U.S. senator.
Dave Loebsack	January 3, 2007 – January 3, 2021	Democratic	2nd	Elected in 2006. Retired.
William Loughridge	March 4, 1867 – March 3, 1871	Republican	4th	Elected in 1866. Lost renomination to Walden.
William Loughridge	March 4, 1873 – March 3, 1875	Republican	6th	Elected in 1872. Lost renomination to Sampson.
Joseph Lyman	March 4, 1885 – March 3, 1889	Republican	9th	Elected in 1884. Retired.
Thomas E. Martin	January 3, 1939 – January 3, 1955	Republican	1st	Elected in 1938. Retired to run for U.S. Senator.
Wiley Mayne	January 3, 1967 – January 3, 1975	Republican	6th	Elected in 1966. Lost re-election to Bedell.
Moses A. McCoid	March 4, 1879 – March 3, 1885	Republican	1st	Elected in 1878. Lost renomination to John S. Woolson.
George W. McCrary	March 4, 1869 – March 3, 1877	Republican	1st	Elected in 1868. Retired.
James W. McDill	March 4, 1873 – March 3, 1877	Republican	8th	Elected in 1872. Retired.
Smith McPherson	March 4, 1899 – June 6, 1900	Republican	9th	Elected in 1898. Resigned when appointed judge for the US District Court for the Southern District of Iowa.
Edward Mezvinsky	January 3, 1973 – January 3, 1977	Democratic	1st	Elected in 1972. Lost re-election to Leach.
Daniel F. Miller	December 20, 1850 – March 3, 1851	Whig	1st	Elected to finish Thompson's term. Retired.
Mariannette Miller-Meeks	January 3, 2021 – January 3, 2023	Republican	2nd	Elected in 2020. Redistricted to the 1st district.
Mariannette Miller-Meeks	January 3, 2023 – present	Republican	1st	Redistricted from the 2nd district and re-elected in 2022.
Jeremiah H. Murphy	March 4, 1883 – March 3, 1887	Democratic	2nd	Elected in 1882. Lost renomination to Hayes.
David R. Nagle	January 3, 1987 – January 3, 1993	Democratic	3rd	Elected in 1986. Redistricted to the 2nd district and lost re-election to Nussle.
Harry E. Narey	November 3, 1942 – January 3, 1943	Republican	9th	Elected to finish Woodbury's term. Retired.
Zach Nunn	January 3, 2023 – present	Republican	3rd	Elected in 2022.
Jim Nussle	January 3, 1991 – January 3, 2003	Republican	2nd	Elected in 1990. Redistricted to the 1st district.
Jim Nussle	January 3, 2003 – January 3, 2007	Republican	1st	Redistricted from the 2nd district and re-elected in 2002. Retired to run for governor.
S. Addison Oliver	March 4, 1875 – March 3, 1879	Republican	9th	Elected in 1874. Retired.
Jackson Orr	March 4, 1871 – March 3, 1873	Republican	6th	Elected in 1870. Redistricted to the 9th district.
Jackson Orr	March 4, 1873 – March 3, 1875	Republican	9th	Redistricted from the 6th district and re-elected in 1872. Retired.
Francis W. Palmer	March 4, 1869 – March 3, 1873	Republican	5th	Elected in 1868. Retired.
Irvin S. Pepper	March 4, 1911 – December 22, 1913	Democratic	2nd	Elected in 1910. Died.
George D. Perkins	March 4, 1891 – March 3, 1899	Republican	11th	Elected in 1890. Lost renomination to Thomas.
Charles E. Pickett	March 4, 1909 – March 3, 1913	Republican	3rd	Elected in 1908. Lost re-election to Connolly.
Charles Pomeroy	March 4, 1869 – March 3, 1871	Republican	6th	Elected in 1868. Lost renomination to Orr.
Henry O. Pratt	March 4, 1873 – March 3, 1877	Republican	4th	Elected in 1872. Retired.
Hiram Price	March 4, 1863 – March 3, 1869	Republican	2nd	Elected in 1862. Retired.
Hiram Price	March 4, 1877 – March 3, 1881	Republican	2nd	Elected in 1876. Retired.
Solomon F. Prouty	March 4, 1911 – March 3, 1915	Republican	7th	Elected in 1910. Retired.
William H. M. Pusey	March 4, 1883 – March 3, 1885	Democratic	9th	Elected in 1882. Lost re-election to Lyman.
C. William Ramseyer	March 4, 1915 – March 3, 1933	Republican	6th	Elected in 1914. Redistricted to the 5th district and lost renomination to Thurston.
Joseph R. Reed	March 4, 1889 – March 3, 1891	Republican	9th	Elected in 1888. Lost re-election to Bowman.
Thomas J. B. Robinson	March 4, 1923 – March 3, 1933	Republican	3rd	Elected in 1922. Lost re-election to Willford.
John N. W. Rumple	March 4, 1901 – January 31, 1903	Republican	2nd	Elected in 1900. Retired and died before next term.
Ezekiel S. Sampson	March 4, 1875 – March 3, 1879	Republican	6th	Elected in 1874. Lost re-election to Weaver.
William F. Sapp	March 4, 1877 – March 3, 1881	Republican	8th	Elected in 1876. Lost renomination to Hepburn.
William J. Scherle	January 3, 1967 – January 3, 1973	Republican	7th	Elected in 1966. Redistricted to the 5th district.
William J. Scherle	January 3, 1973 – January 3, 1975	Republican	5th	Redistricted from the 7th district and re-elected in 1972. Lost re-election to Harkin.
John R. Schmidhauser	January 3, 1965 – January 3, 1967	Democratic	1st	Elected in 1964. Lost re-election to Schwengel.
Fred Schwengel	January 3, 1955 – January 3, 1965	Republican	1st	Elected in 1954. Lost re-election to Schmidhauser.
Fred Schwengel	January 3, 1967 – January 3, 1973	Republican	1st	Elected in 1966. Lost re-election to Mezvinsky.
George Cromwell Scott	November 5, 1912 – March 3, 1915	Republican	11th	Elected to finish Hubbard's term. Lost re-election to Steele.
George Cromwell Scott	March 4, 1917 – March 3, 1919	Republican	11th	Elected in 1916. Retired.
John J. Seerley	March 4, 1891 – March 3, 1893	Democratic	1st	Elected in 1890. Lost re-election to Gear.
Hiram Y. Smith	December 2, 1884 – March 3, 1885	Republican	7th	Elected to finish Kasson's term. Retired.
Neal Smith	January 3, 1959 – January 3, 1973	Democratic	5th	Elected in 1958. Redistricted to the 4th district.
Neal Smith	January 3, 1973 – January 3, 1995	Democratic	4th	Redistricted from the 5th district and re-elected in 1972. Lost re-election to Ganske.
Walter I. Smith	December 3, 1900 – March 15, 1911	Republican	9th	Elected to finish McPherson's term. Resigned after being appointed judge of the United States Court of Appeals for the Eighth Circuit.
William Smyth	March 4, 1869 – September 30, 1870	Republican	2nd	Elected in 1868. Died.
Thomas J. Steele	March 4, 1915 – March 3, 1917	Democratic	11th	Elected in 1914. Lost re-election to Scott.
Joseph C. Stone	March 4, 1877 – March 3, 1879	Republican	1st	Elected in 1876. Lost renomination to McCoid.
Isaac S. Struble	March 4, 1883 – March 3, 1891	Republican	11th	Elected in 1882. Lost renomination to Perkins.
Charles Edward Swanson	March 4, 1929 – March 3, 1933	Republican	9th	Elected in 1928. Redistricted to the 7th district and lost re-election to Wearin.
Burton E. Sweet	March 4, 1915 – March 3, 1923	Republican	3rd	Elected in 1914. Retired to run for U.S. senator.
Joseph H. Sweney	March 4, 1889 – March 3, 1891	Republican	4th	Elected in 1888. Lost re-election to Butler.
Henry O. Talle	January 3, 1939 – January 3, 1943	Republican	4th	Elected in 1938. Redistricted to the 2nd district.
Henry O. Talle	January 3, 1943 – January 3, 1959	Republican	2nd	Redistricted from the 4th district and re-elected in 1942. Lost re-election to L. Wolf.
Tom Tauke	January 3, 1979 – January 3, 1991	Republican	2nd	Elected in 1978. Retired to run for U.S. senator.
Lot Thomas	March 4, 1899 – March 3, 1905	Republican	11th	Elected in 1898. Lost renomination to E. Hubbard.
William Thompson	March 4, 1847 – June 29, 1850	Democratic	1st	Elected in 1846. Seat declared vacant due to election challenge.
William George Thompson	December 1, 1879 – March 3, 1883	Republican	5th	Elected to finish R. Clark's term. Retired.
James Thorington	March 4, 1855 – March 3, 1857	Whig	2nd	Elected in 1854. Lost Republican nomination and retired.
Lloyd Thurston	March 4, 1925 – March 3, 1933	Republican	8th	Elected in 1924. Redistricted to the 5th district.
Lloyd Thurston	March 4, 1933 – January 3, 1939	Republican	5th	Redistricted from the 8th district and re-elected in 1932. Retired to run for U.S. senator.
Horace Mann Towner	March 4, 1911 – April 1, 1923	Republican	8th	Elected in 1910. Resigned to become Governor of Puerto Rico.
John Q. Tufts	March 4, 1875 – March 3, 1877	Republican	2nd	Elected in 1874. Retired.
Thomas Updegraff	March 4, 1879 – March 3, 1883	Republican	3rd	Elected in 1878. Redistricted to the 4th district and lost re-election to Weller.
Thomas Updegraff	March 4, 1893 – March 3, 1899	Republican	4th	Elected in 1892. Lost renomination to Haugen.
Hubert Utterback	January 3, 1935 – January 3, 1937	Democratic	6th	Elected in 1934. Retired to run for U.S. senator.
William Vandever	March 4, 1859 – March 3, 1863	Republican	2nd	Elected in 1858. Retired. (Note: Service effectively ended in 1861 when promoted to Major General, but did not officially resign.)
Earl W. Vincent	June 4, 1928 – March 3, 1929	Republican	9th	Elected to finish Green's term. Lost renomination to Swanson.
Henry Vollmer	February 10, 1914 – March 3, 1915	Democratic	2nd	Elected to finish Pepper's term. Retired.
Martin Joseph Wade	March 4, 1903 – March 3, 1905	Democratic	2nd	Elected in 1902. Lost re-election to Dawson.
Madison M. Walden	March 4, 1871 – March 3, 1873	Republican	4th	Elected in 1870. Lost renomination to Pratt.
Otha Wearin	March 4, 1933 – January 3, 1939	Democratic	7th	Elected in 1932. Retired to run for U.S. senator.
James B. Weaver	March 4, 1879 – March 3, 1881	Greenback	6th	Elected in 1878. Retired to run for president.
James B. Weaver	March 4, 1885 – March 3, 1889	Greenback	6th	Elected in 1884. Lost re-election to Lacey.
Luman Hamlin Weller	March 4, 1883 – March 3, 1885	Greenback	4th	Elected in 1882. Lost re-election to Fuller.
Frederick E. White	March 4, 1891 – March 3, 1893	Democratic	6th	Elected in 1890. Lost re-election to Lacey.
Albert C. Willford	March 4, 1933 – January 3, 1935	Democratic	3rd	Elected in 1932. Lost re-election to Gwynne.
James Wilson	March 4, 1873 – March 3, 1877	Republican	5th	Elected in 1872. Retired.
James Wilson	March 4, 1883 – March 3, 1885	Republican	5th	Elected in 1882. Retired but lost contested election to Frederick before end of term.
James F. Wilson	October 8, 1861 – March 3, 1869	Republican	1st	Elected to finish Curtis's term. Retired.
Leonard G. Wolf	January 3, 1959 – January 3, 1961	Democratic	2nd	Elected in 1958. Lost re-election to Bromwell.
William P. Wolf	December 6, 1870 – March 3, 1871	Republican	2nd	Elected to finish Smyth's term. Retired.
Frank P. Woods	March 4, 1909 – March 3, 1919	Republican	10th	Elected in 1908. Lost renomination to Dickinson.
David Young	January 3, 2015 – January 3, 2019	Republican	3rd	Elected in 2014. Lost re-election to Axne.

== See also ==
- Iowa's congressional delegations
- Iowa's congressional districts
- List of United States senators from Iowa
