= James P. Flick =

American politician (1845–1929)

James Flick
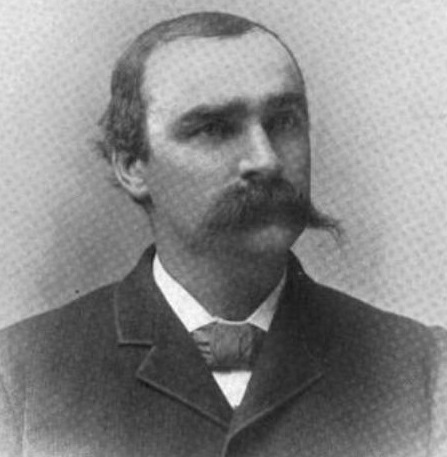

Member of the U.S. House of Representatives from Iowa's 8th district
- In office March 4, 1889 – March 3, 1893
- Preceded by: Albert R. Anderson
- Succeeded by: William P. Hepburn

Personal details
- Born: August 28, 1845 Bakerstown, Pennsylvania, U.S.
- Died: February 25, 1929 (aged 83) Bedford, Iowa, U.S
- Party: Republican

Military service
- Branch/service: Union Army
- Years of service: April 3, 1862–September 4, 1864
- Rank: Private
- Unit: Company K, 4th Iowa Infantry Regiment
- Battles/wars: Civil War

James Patton Flick (August 28, 1845 – February 25, 1929) was a two-term Republican U.S. Representative from Iowa's 8th congressional district in the Gilded Age.

Born in Bakerstown, Pennsylvania, Flick moved with his parents to Wapello County, Iowa, in 1852 and to Taylor County, Iowa in 1857. He attended the common schools. Following the outbreak of the American Civil War he enlisted in Company K, 4th Iowa Volunteer Infantry Regiment, as a private soldier and served from April 3, 1862, to September 4, 1864.

Following the war, he served as Recorder of Taylor County in 1869 and 1870. After studying law, he was admitted to the bar in 1870 and commenced practice in Bedford, Iowa. He served in the Iowa House of Representatives in 1878 and 1879, then served as district attorney of the third judicial district of Iowa from 1880 to 1886.

In 1888 Flick was elected as a Republican to the U.S. House seat for Iowa's 8th congressional district. After serving in the 51st United States Congress he was re-elected in 1890, surviving the Democratic Party's first landslide victory since the Iowa Republican Party was founded. He then served in the Fifty-second Congress. In all, he was in Congress from March 4, 1889, to March 3, 1893.

In 1892, he was not a candidate for renomination. After returning to Iowa, he resumed the practice of his profession in Bedford, until his death there on February 25, 1929. He was interred in Bedford Cemetery.

U.S. House of Representatives
Preceded by Albert R. Anderson	Member of the U.S. House of Representatives from Iowa's 8th congressional district 1889 – 1893	Succeeded by William P. Hepburn
