= William P. Hepburn =

American politician (1833–1916)

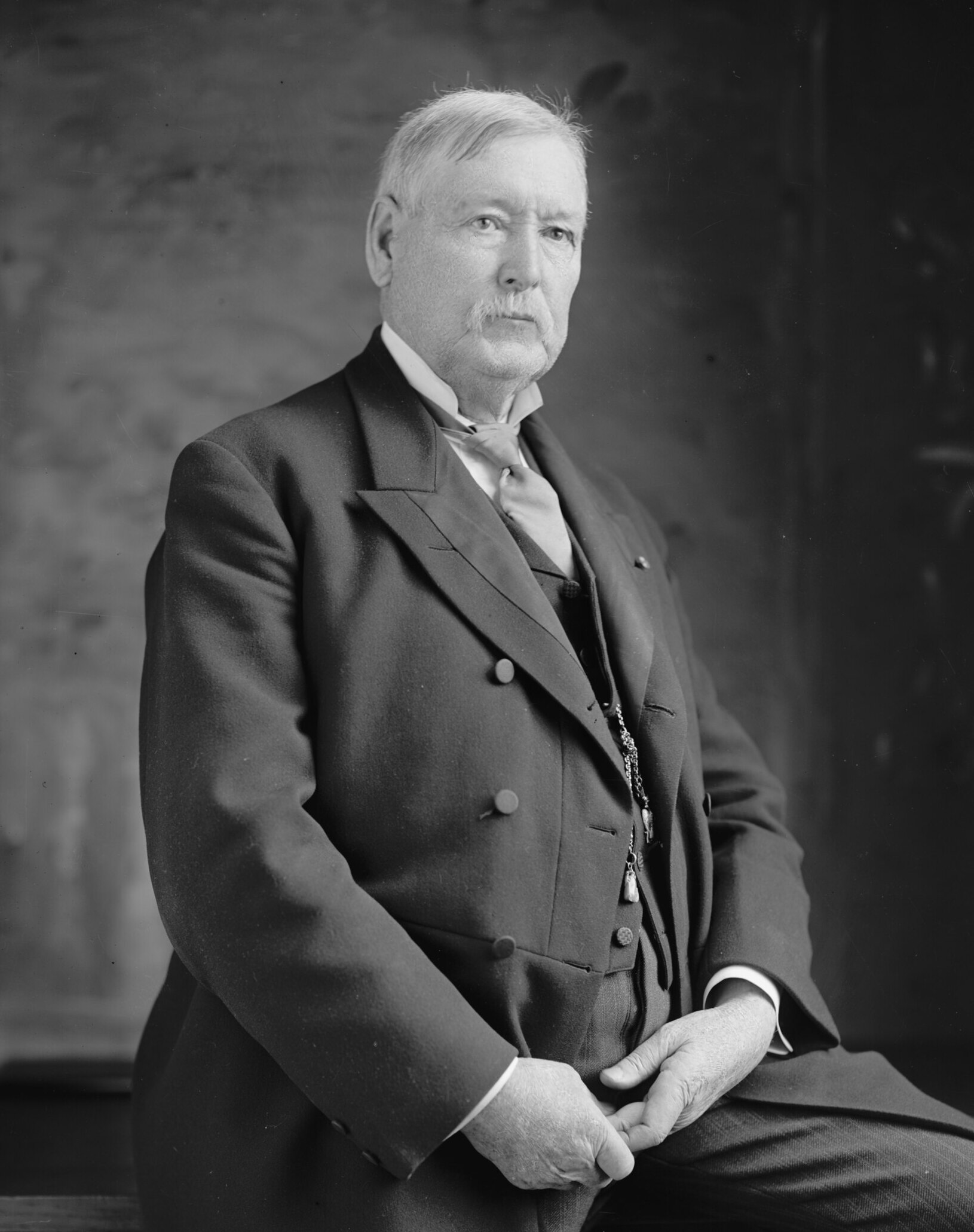

Member of the U.S. House of Representatives from Iowa's 8th district
- In office March 4, 1881 – March 3, 1887
- Preceded by: James P. Flick
- Succeeded by: William Darius Jamieson
- In office March 4, 1893 – March 3, 1909
- Preceded by: William Fletcher Sapp
- Succeeded by: Albert R. Anderson

Personal details
- Born: November 4, 1833 Wellsville, Ohio, U.S.
- Died: February 7, 1916 (aged 82) Clarinda, Iowa, U.S.
- Party: Republican
- Profession: Attorney

Military service
- Branch/service: Union Army
- Rank: Captain
- Unit: Company B, 2nd Iowa Cavalry Regiment
- Battles/wars: Civil War; Battle of Island Number Ten; Siege of Corinth; Battle of Iuka

William Peters Hepburn (November 4, 1833 – February 7, 1916) was an American Civil War officer and an eleven-term Republican congressman from Iowa's now-obsolete 8th congressional district, serving from 1881 to 1887, and from 1893 to 1909. According to historian Edmund Morris, "Hepburn was the House's best debater, admired for his strength of character and legal acumen." As chair of one of the most powerful committees in Congress, he guided or sponsored many statutes regulating businesses, including most notably the Hepburn Act of 1906. The Hepburn Act authorized the U.S. Interstate Commerce Commission to require railroads to charge "just and reasonable" rates.

== Background ==
Hepburn was born in Wellsville, Ohio and raised from the age of seven in Iowa City, Iowa. His schooling was limited to a few months in an Iowa City academy. The great-grandson of Revolutionary War officer, printer, and congressman Matthew Lyon, and the great-great-grandson of Thomas Chittenden, the first Governor of Vermont, he was first engaged as an apprentice printer, before studying law. He became prosecuting attorney of Marshall County in 1856 as well as serving as district attorney for the eleventh judicial district from 1856 to 1861. He was also the clerk to the Iowa House of Representatives.

In May 1860, Hepburn was one of two delegates representing counties in the eleventh judicial district at the 1860 Republican National Convention, where Abraham Lincoln was nominated. The following March, when serving a brief term as a lobbyist for those counties in Washington D.C., Hepburn attended Lincoln's presidential inauguration.

== Civil War service ==
During the Civil War, he served as an officer in the 2nd Regiment Iowa Volunteer Cavalry. He was promoted from captain of Company B to major of the First Battalion on September 13, 1861, then to lieutenant colonel in 1862. He participated in the final stage of the Battle of Island Number Ten near New Madrid, Missouri, and saw combat during the Siege of Corinth, the Battle of Iuka in northeastern Mississippi, and the Battle of Collierville, Tennessee. From time to time he was also assigned as an inspector of cavalry for the Army of the Cumberland and, due to his legal experience, served as an acting inspector general and court martial president or judge advocate for troops in the lower Mississippi River theater.

He was mustered out on October 3, 1864, upon the expiration of his term of service. He moved his family to Memphis, Tennessee before returning to Iowa in 1867, to a home in Clarinda. In 1886, he joined the Military Order of the Loyal Legion of the United States (MOLLUS), through that organization's District of Columbia Commandery, as Companion #04476. The MOLLUS was the first post-Civil War veterans' organization, founded by and for those who served as commissioned officers in the Union army and navy.

== First service in Congress ==
Soon after Hepburn established his legal practice in Clarinda, Iowa, he again became active in Republican politics. In 1880, Hepburn was elected as a Republican to the United States House of Representatives from Iowa's 8th congressional district, after defeating incumbent William F. Sapp in the district convention on the 346th ballot. He was re-elected in 1882 and 1884, but was defeated in the 1886 general election by Independent Republican Albert R. Anderson. Anderson, a former state railroad commissioner, had run on an anti-monopolist, anti-corporate platform, and "specialized in the unfairness and excesses of the prevailing railroad rates." Historians have viewed Hepburn's defeat as a catalyst for authorization of a federal Interstate Commerce Commission, which became a higher priority for other congressman who hoped to avoid Hepburn's fate.

In 1888, two years after his defeat, he was the principal opponent to James F. Wilson for the Republican nomination for U.S. Senate. However, when it became apparent that he lacked the votes among the Iowa General Assembly to defeat Wilson, his supporters withdrew his name from consideration.

After the election of President Benjamin Harrison returned the White House to Republican hands in 1889, Hepburn served as Solicitor of the Treasury.

== Return to Congress ==
In 1892, after three terms away from Congress, Hepburn ran again for his former seat after Anderson's successor, Republican James Patton Flick, declined to run for a third term. Hepburn won his party's nomination and the general election, and was re-elected seven more times. During this period he served as Chairman of the Committee on Interstate and Foreign Commerce.

In 1894, Hepburn finished a distant second in the Republican caucus to nominate a successor to retiring U.S. Senator Wilson.

In 1899, Hepburn briefly became a candidate for election as Speaker of the House, but soon deferred to the successful candidacy of fellow Iowan and Civil War veteran David B. Henderson. Hepburn became notorious for his disdainful treatment on the House floor of newer members, prompting the New York Times to refer to him as the "House Terror." However, Hepburn was also an enduring but outspoken advocate to reform House rules that vested autocratic powers in Speakers of the House.

Even before the publication of Upton Sinclair's expose The Jungle, Hepburn led efforts to adopt federal laws regulating food quality. In 1902 the Hepburn Pure Food Act passed the House (but not the Senate). When such a bill finally passed both houses as the Pure Food and Drug Act of 1906 (following the publication of Sinclair's book), Hepburn was the bill's floor manager.

Hepburn was also instrumental in appropriating funds for a canal connecting the Atlantic and Pacific oceans. Hepburn initially preferred a route through Nicaragua over a route through Panama, but ultimately became a key House sponsor of appropriations measures necessary for completion of the canal through Panama.

== Hepburn Act of 1906 ==
He also sponsored the Hepburn Act of 1906, a major priority in the second term of President Theodore Roosevelt. The Act gave the Interstate Commerce Commission (ICC) the power to set maximum railroad rates and led to the discontinuation of free passes to loyal shippers. Scholars consider the Hepburn Act the most important piece of legislation regarding railroads in the first half of the 20th century, while economists debate whether it went too far, and if its passage contributed to the Panic of 1907.

== Surprise defeat, and success at House reform ==
When running for his twelfth term in 1908, Hepburn was upset in the general election by his Democratic opponent, William D. Jamieson. In a year of strong Republican victories in Iowa (led by presidential candidate William Howard Taft), Jamieson won majorities in eight of the district's eleven counties. Hepburn's loss was attributed to "purely local conditions and local strife," such as anger over bank failures and Hepburn's choices for local postmasters.

After his defeat but before his final term ended, he became the chairman of a 25-member group seeking once again to reform House rules that allowed Speaker Joe Cannon to amass even greater powers. This time, Hepburn's reform efforts succeeded; Speaker Cannon was forced to surrender the power to block bills he did not like from coming to the floor once they received committee support.

== After Congress ==
Hepburn returned to the practice of law, first in Washington, D.C., then in Clarinda. He died on February 7, 1916.

== Honors ==
The small town of Hepburn, Iowa, a few miles north of Clarinda, was named in his honor.

His home in Clarinda, known as the William P. Hepburn House, is a National Historic Landmark.

U.S. House of Representatives
Preceded by William F. Sapp	Member of the U.S. House of Representatives from Iowa's 8th congressional district 1881 – 1887	Succeeded by Albert R. Anderson
Preceded by James P. Flick	Member of the U.S. House of Representatives from Iowa's 8th congressional district 1893 – 1909	Succeeded by William D. Jamieson
