= William Fletcher Sapp =

American politician (1824–1890)

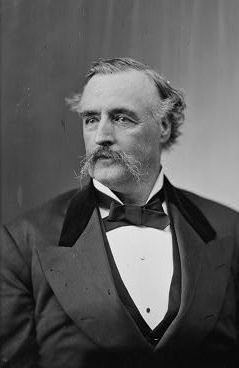

Member of the U.S. House of Representatives from Iowa's 8th district
- In office March 4, 1877 – March 3, 1881
- Preceded by: James W. McDill
- Succeeded by: William Peters Hepburn

Member of the Iowa House of Representatives
- In office 1865

Personal details
- Born: November 20, 1824 Danville, Ohio
- Died: November 22, 1890 (aged 66)
- Party: Republican
- Profession: Attorney

William Fletcher Sapp (November 20, 1824 – November 22, 1890) was a United States attorney and later a Republican U.S. representative from Iowa's 8th congressional district. He was a nephew of William R. Sapp, who represented a U.S. House district in Ohio between 1853 and 1857.

Born in Danville, Ohio, Sapp attended the public schools and Martinsburg Academy. After studying law, he was admitted to the bar in 1850 and commenced practice in Mount Vernon, Ohio. He was an unsuccessful candidate for prosecuting attorney of Knox County, Ohio in 1850, but was elected four years later (in 1854) and re-elected in 1856.

Sapp moved to Omaha, Nebraska, in 1860. He was appointed adjutant general of Nebraska Territory in 1861 and also served as member of the Territorial legislative council. He entered the Union Army in 1862 as lieutenant colonel of the 2nd Nebraska Cavalry and served until mustered out.

He then moved to Council Bluffs, Iowa, and resumed the practice of law. He began serving as member of the Iowa House of Representatives in 1865. Following the conclusion of his legislative service, he was the United States Attorney for the District of Iowa from 1869 to 1873.

In 1876, Sapp was elected as a Republican to the U.S. House seat for Iowa's 8th congressional district. After serving in the 45th United States Congress, he was re-elected and then served in the 46th United States Congress. He was a candidate for renomination in 1880 but was defeated by another former lieutenant colonel of a cavalry during the Civil War, William Peters Hepburn, after 346 ballots. In all, he served in Congress from March 4, 1877, to March 3, 1881.

After leaving Congress, Sapp resumed the practice of law in Iowa. He died in Council Bluffs, on November 22, 1890. He was interred in Mound View Cemetery in Mount Vernon, Ohio.

U.S. House of Representatives
Preceded by James W. McDill	Member of the U.S. House of Representatives from Iowa's 8th congressional district 1877 – 1881	Succeeded by William P. Hepburn
