= William Darius Jamieson =

American politician (1873–1949)

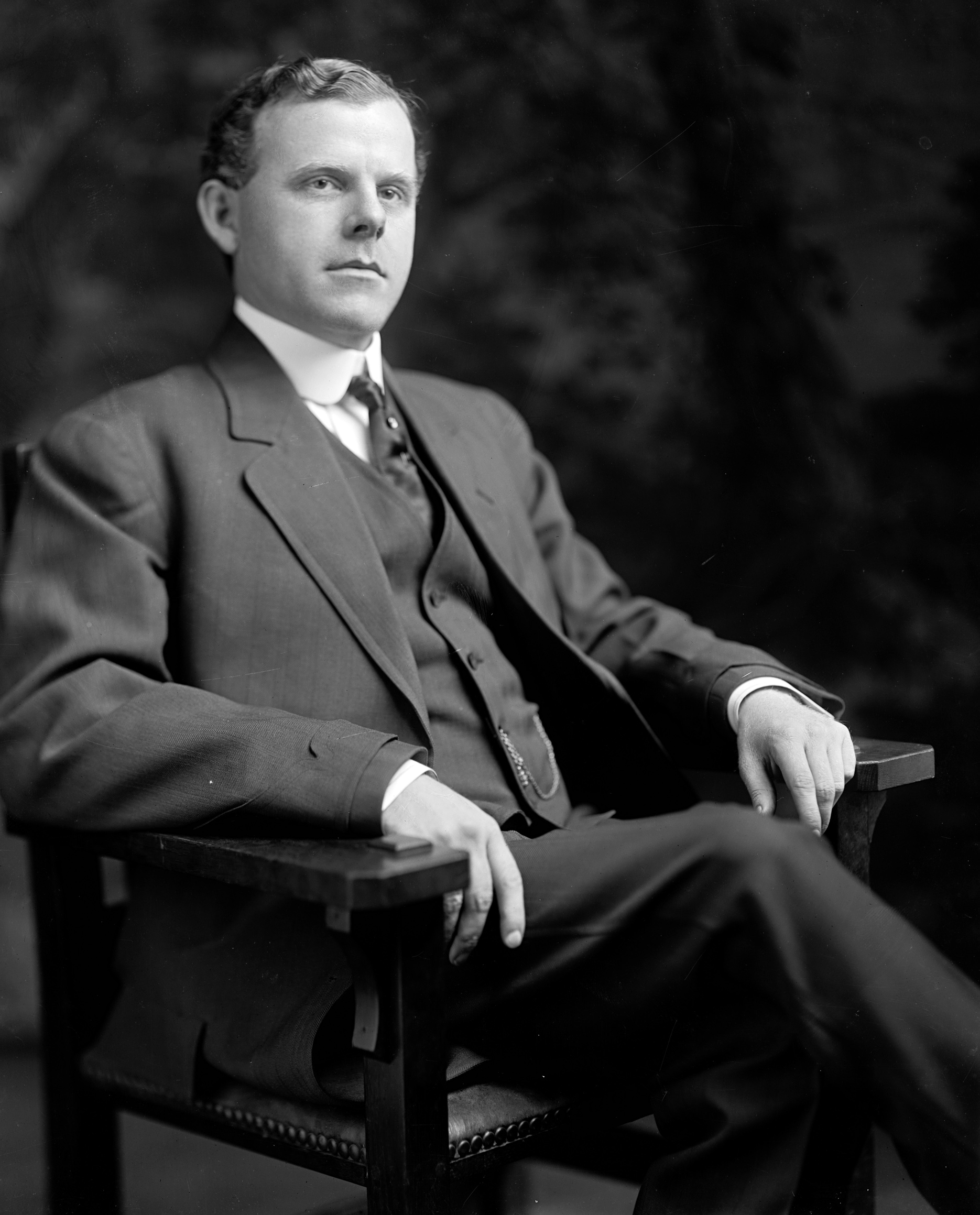

Member of the U.S. House of Representatives from Iowa's 8th district
- In office March 4, 1909 – March 3, 1911
- Preceded by: William P. Hepburn
- Succeeded by: Horace M. Towner

Member of the Iowa Senate from Page County and Fremont County
- In office January 1, 1907 - March 3, 1909

Personal details
- Born: November 9, 1873 Louisa County, Iowa
- Died: November 18, 1949 (aged 76) Washington D.C.
- Party: Democratic

William Darius Jamieson (November 9, 1873 – November 18, 1949) was a newspaper publisher and a Democratic U.S. representative from Iowa's 8th congressional district. The only Democrat elected from that district in its ninety-year history, Jamieson served only a single term. He studied law at the National University Law School in Washington, D.C. Jamieson edited and published the Ida Grove Pioneer in 1893 and 1894, the Columbus Junction Gazette from 1899 to 1901, the Shenandoah World from 1901 to 1916, and was also editor of the Hamburg Democrat.

He was elected as a Democrat to the Iowa State Senate in 1906, representing two Republican-leaning counties (Page and Fremont) in southwestern Iowa.

In 1908 (midway into his four-year Iowa Senate term), Jamieson ran for the U.S. House seat in Iowa's 8th congressional district. In a year of strong Republican victories in Iowa (led by presidential candidate William Howard Taft), Jamieson upset longtime Republican Congressman William P. Hepburn, winning majorities in eight of the district's eleven counties. The thirty-five-year-old's defeat of a Civil War and political veteran more than twice his age was attributed to "purely local conditions and local strife," such as anger over bank failures and Hepburn's choices for local postmasters.

Jamieson served in the Sixty-first Congress. Citing health reasons and the costs of keeping his seat, he declined to be a candidate for renomination in 1910. Instead, he resumed newspaper activities in Shenandoah.

He was Postmaster of Shenandoah from May 29, 1915, until his resignation on September 1, 1916. Returning to Washington, he served as assistant treasurer of the Democratic National Committee in 1916 and its director of finance from 1917 to 1920, then engaged in the practice of law in Washington. He served as delegate at large to the Democratic National Convention in 1920.

He was editor of The Window Seat, a weekly syndicate letter for country newspapers, from 1925 until his death in Washington, D.C., on November 18, 1949. He was interred in Fort Lincoln Cemetery.

U.S. House of Representatives
Preceded by William P. Hepburn	Member of the U.S. House of Representatives from Iowa's 8th congressional district 1909 – 1911	Succeeded by Horace M. Towner
