= Hiram K. Evans =

American politician (1863–1941)

Hiram Evans
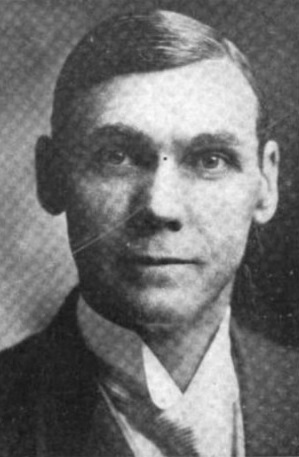
- Evans in 1914

Member of the U.S. House of Representatives from Iowa's 8th district
- In office June 4, 1923 – March 3, 1925
- Preceded by: Horace Mann Towner
- Succeeded by: Lloyd Thurston

Personal details
- Born: March 17, 1863 Wayne County, Iowa, U.S.
- Died: July 9, 1941 (aged 78) Corydon, Iowa, U.S
- Party: Republican
- Education: University of Iowa

Hiram Kinsman Evans (March 17, 1863 – July 9, 1941) served part of one term as a Republican U.S. Representative from Iowa's 8th congressional district.

Born in Walnut Township, Wayne County, Iowa, Evans attended the country schools and Seymour and Allerton (Iowa) High Schools. He graduated from the University of Iowa College of Law at Iowa City, Iowa in 1886. He was admitted to the bar that year, and commenced practice in Holdrege, Nebraska. He moved to Seymour, Iowa in 1887, and to Corydon, Iowa in 1889 and continued the practice of law. He served as prosecuting attorney for Wayne County, Iowa from 1891 to 1895.

He was elected to one two-year term as member of the Iowa House of Representatives in 1896 and 1897. He was appointed as a member of the board of regents of the University of Iowa, serving from 1897 to 1904. He was elected mayor of Corydon, serving from 1901 to 1903. He was a judge of the third judicial district of Iowa from 1904 until 1923, when he resigned.

In 1923, Horace M. Towner resigned his seat representing Iowa's 8th congressional district in the U.S. House, soon after his sixth term began, when President Warren G. Harding appointed him Governor of Puerto Rico. In a special election, Evans was elected as a Republican to serve out the remainder of Towner's term in the Sixty-eighth Congress. He declined to be a candidate for renomination in 1924. In all, Evans served from June 4, 1923, to March 3, 1925.

After returning from Washington, Evans resumed the practice of law in Corydon. He was appointed by the Governor of Iowa as a member of the State Board of Parole on July 1, 1927, and served to July 1, 1933. He died in Corydon on July 9, 1941, and was interred in Corydon Cemetery.

U.S. House of Representatives
Preceded by Horace M. Towner	Member of the U.S. House of Representatives from Iowa's 8th congressional district June 4, 1923 – March 3, 1925	Succeeded by Lloyd Thurston
