= James W. McDill =

American politician

James Wilson McDill
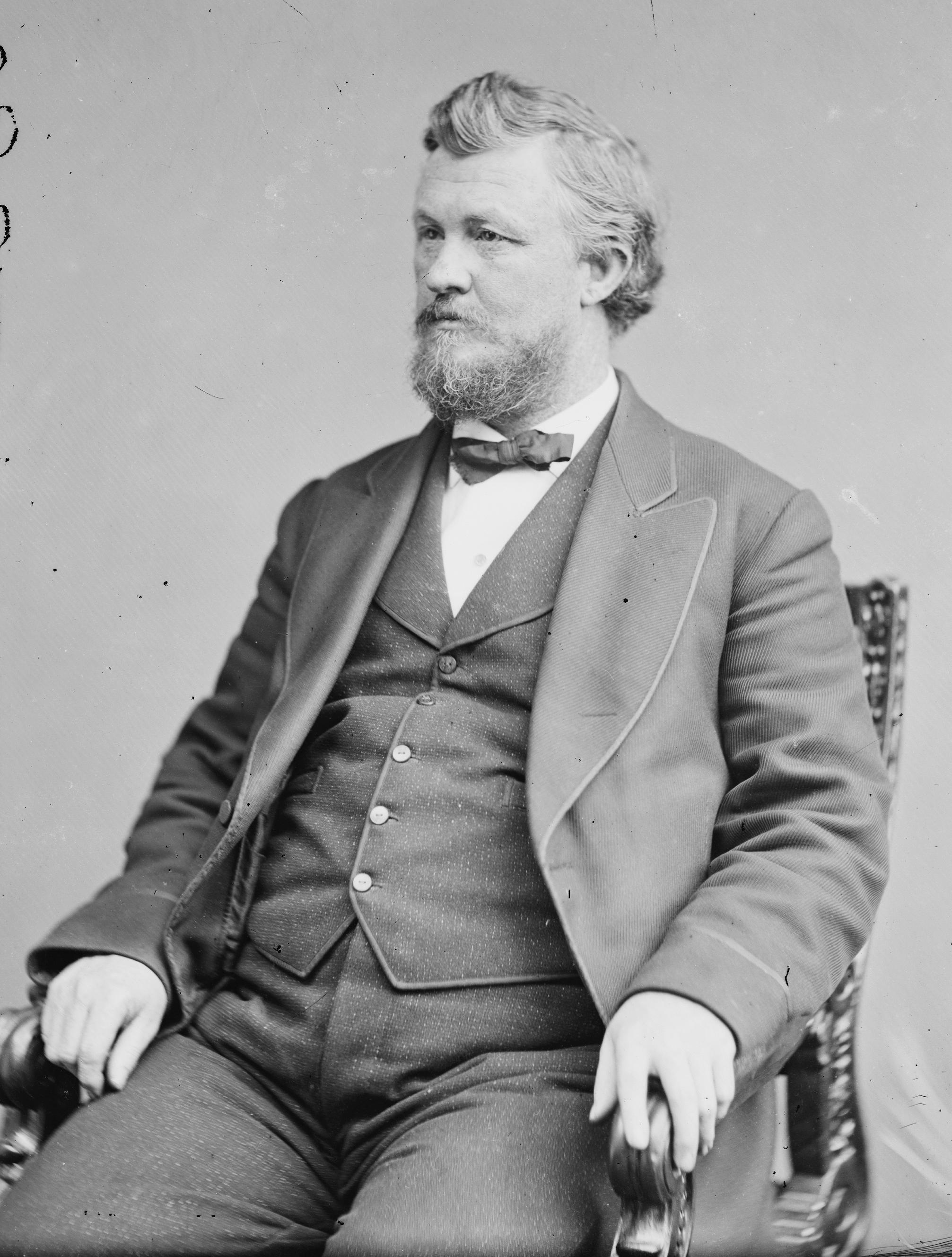

United States Senator from Iowa
- In office March 8, 1881 – March 3, 1883
- Preceded by: Samuel J. Kirkwood
- Succeeded by: James F. Wilson

Member of the U.S. House of Representatives from Iowa's 8th district
- In office March 4, 1873 – March 3, 1877
- Preceded by: District created
- Succeeded by: William F. Sapp

Personal details
- Born: March 4, 1834 Monroe, Ohio
- Died: February 28, 1894 (aged 59) Creston, Iowa
- Party: Republican
- Education: Miami University
- Profession: Attorney

James Wilson McDill (March 4, 1834 – February 28, 1894) was an American lawyer, state-court judge, Republican United States Representative and Senator from Iowa, state railroad commissioner, and member of the Interstate Commerce Commission.

Born in Monroe, Ohio, he attended the common schools, Hanover College, and South Salem Academy (in South Salem, Ohio). He graduated from Miami University (in Oxford, Ohio) in 1853. He studied law in Columbus, Ohio, and was admitted to the bar in 1856.

McDill then moved to Afton, Iowa, in southwestern Iowa, and commenced practice. He was elected superintendent of Union County, Iowa, in 1859 and was elected county judge in 1860. He was a clerk in the office of the Third Auditor of the Treasury in Washington, D.C., from 1862 to 1865, when he resigned and returned to Iowa. He was elected circuit judge in 1868, and later district judge of the third judicial circuit of Iowa.

In 1872, he was elected as a Republican to represent Iowa's 8th congressional district in the U.S. House. He initially served in the Forty-third Congress. He was re-elected two years later, to the Forty-fourth Congress. He declined to be a candidate for renomination in 1876. In all, he served in the House from March 4, 1873, to March 3, 1877.

McDill resumed the practice of law in Afton. He was a member of the Board of Railroad Commissioners of the State of Iowa from 1878 to 1881.

In March 1881, he was appointed by Governor John H. Gear to fill the U.S. Senate vacancy caused by the resignation of Samuel J. Kirkwood, whom President James A. Garfield had appointed Secretary of the Interior. McDill was required to stand for election in the next session of the Iowa General Assembly, in 1882. James F. Wilson was elected to the "long term" Senate seat (for 1883 to 1889), which McDill did not seek, but McDill was elected to continue holding the seat in the short run (until March 1883). In all, he served in the Senate from March 8, 1881, until March 3, 1883.

After his term ended, he was again appointed Railroad Commissioner for three years beginning in April 1884.

In 1892, he was appointed by President Benjamin Harrison a member of the Interstate Commerce Commission and served until his death in Creston, Iowa, in 1894. He was interred in Graceland Cemetery.

U.S. Senate
Preceded by Samuel J. Kirkwood	U.S. senator (Class 2) from Iowa; 1881–1883; Served alongside: William B. Allison	Succeeded by James F. Wilson
U.S. House of Representatives
Preceded by District created	Member of the U.S. House of Representatives from Iowa's 8th congressional district 1873 – 1877	Succeeded by William F. Sapp
