= Horace M. Towner =

American politician and governor of Puerto Rico (1855–1937)

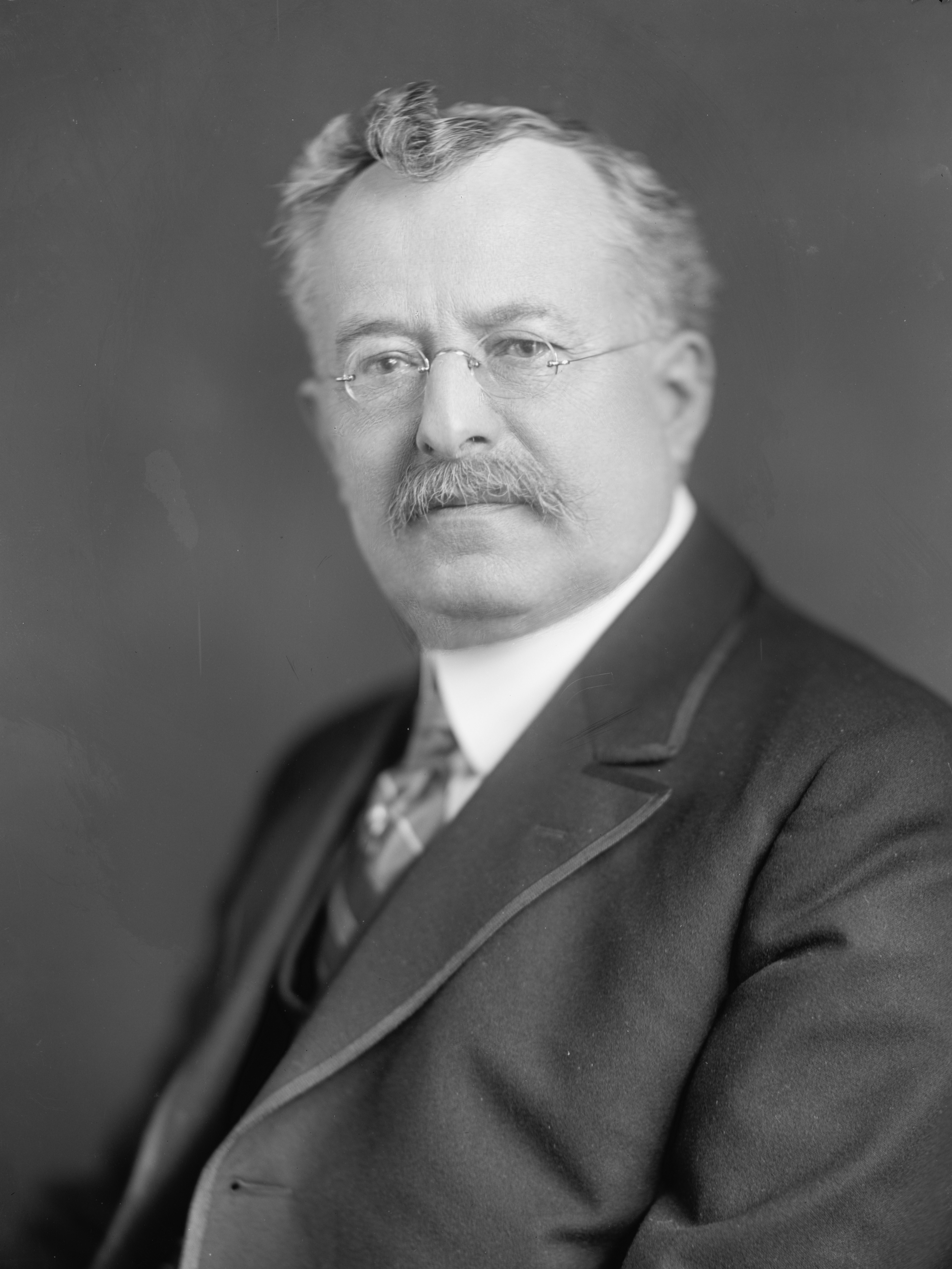
- Towner, 1905–1937

Governor of Puerto Rico
- In office April 1, 1923 – September 29, 1929
- President: Calvin Coolidge; Herbert Hoover
- Preceded by: Juan Bernardo Huyke (acting)
- Succeeded by: James R. Beverley

Member of the U.S. House of Representatives from Iowa's 8th district
- In office March 4, 1911 – April 1, 1923
- Preceded by: William Darius Jamieson
- Succeeded by: Hiram Kinsman Evans

Personal details
- Born: October 23, 1855 Belvidere, Illinois, U.S.
- Died: November 23, 1937 (aged 82) Corning, Iowa, U.S.
- Party: Republican
- Education: University of Chicago (BA); Union College of Law (LLB)

Horace Mann Towner (October 23, 1855 – November 23, 1937) was an American politician who served as a member of the United States House of Representatives from Iowa's 8th congressional district and who was appointed the governor of Puerto Rico. In an era in which the federal government's role in health and education was small, he was an early leader of efforts to expand that role.

== Early life and education ==
Towner was born in Belvidere, Illinois, the son of John and Keziah Towner. He was educated in the public schools at Belvidere, at the University of Chicago, and at the Union College of Law (now the Northwestern University Pritzker School of Law).

== Career ==
Towner was admitted to the bar in 1877, and initially practiced law in Prescott, Iowa, in Adams County. In 1880, he was elected county superintendent of schools at Corning, Iowa, in which capacity he served until 1884. He resumed the practice of law in Corning. In 1887 he married Harriet Elizabeth Cole, at Corning. They had three children, Leta, Horace, and Constance.

In 1890, he was elected as a judge of the third judicial district of Iowa. He also served as a lecturer on constitutional law at the University of Iowa from 1902 to 1911. In addition, he was a pianist and a composer, who set to music "Iowa, Beautiful Land", that at one time was once Iowa's official song.

=== U.S. Congress ===
In 1910 Towner ran successfully as a Republican to succeed retiring Democrat William Darius Jamieson representing Iowa's 8th congressional district in the U.S. House. He was re-elected five times. From 1919 to 1923, he was served as the House Republican Conference Chairman.

He was the co-author (with Texas Senator Morris Sheppard) of the first federal law to offer matching federal funds for social welfare or to offer grants-in-aid to states for health purposes. That law, known as the Sheppard-Towner Act or the Maternity and Infant Act, was designed to lower the United States' relatively high rates of infant mortality, and established maternal and child health services in each state. First offered in 1919, it passed in 1921. Although the program it created was chronically underfunded after passage and was allowed to expire in 1929, it paved the way for many similar state-federal social welfare programs in the New Deal era and thereafter.

Towner was the co-sponsor of the Towner-Sterling bill, which would have created a cabinet-level department of education. It failed to pass during his tenure in the House, and over 50 years would pass before its objective would be fully realized with the creation of the U.S. Department of Education.

=== Governor of Puerto Rico ===
During his congressional tenure, Towner served as chairman of the United States House Committee on Insular Affairs, a committee with oversight responsibility over protectorates and territories. In early-1923, President Warren G. Harding appointed Towner as Governor of Puerto Rico, a post he held until September 29, 1929. His tenure was characterized by the construction several public works projects, such as the system of aqueducts in various sectors, the irrigation system in Isabela, the School of Tropical Medicine building in Puerta de Tierra, and the penitentiary. He also implemented a retirement law for public employees and a new tax law.

== Personal life ==
Towner resumed the practice of law in Corning until his death on November 23, 1937. Towner had been seriously injured on November 13 after falling at his home. He was interred in Walnut Grove Cemetery. He is the namesake of Horace Mann Towner Primary Schools in Comerío, Puerto Rico, Caguas, Puerto Rico and Cataño, Puerto Rico.

U.S. House of Representatives
Preceded by William Darius Jamieson	Member of the U.S. House of Representatives from Iowa's 8th congressional district 1911–1923	Succeeded by Hiram Kinsman Evans
Political offices
Preceded by Juan Bernardo Huyke (Acting)	Governor of Puerto Rico; April 1, 1923 – September 29, 1929	Succeeded by James R. Beverley (Acting)
