= Iowa's congressional districts =

U.S. House Districts in the state of Iowa

Iowa's congressional districts since 2023 Interactive map version

Iowa is divided into four congressional districts, each represented by a member of the United States House of Representatives. The state's congressional map is roughly divided by quadrants in the northeast, northwest, southeast, and southwest sections of Iowa.

The districts were represented by three Republicans and one Democrat from the 2014 elections to the 2020 elections, with a brief period of Democratic control after the 2018 elections. In the 2022 elections, Republicans won every seat for the first time since the 1994 elections.

== Current districts and representatives ==
This is a list of United States representatives from Iowa, their terms, their district boundaries, and the district political ratings according to the CPVI. The delegation has a total of 4 members, all Republicans as of 2025.

Current U.S. representatives from Iowa
District	Member (Residence)	Party	Incumbent since	CPVI (2025)	District map
1st	Mariannette Miller-Meeks (Davenport)	Republican	January 3, 2021	R+4	
2nd	Ashley Hinson (Marion)	Republican	January 3, 2021	R+4	
3rd	Zach Nunn (Bondurant)	Republican	January 3, 2023	R+2	
4th	Randy Feenstra (Hull)	Republican	January 3, 2021	R+15	

== District boundaries since 1973 ==
Table of United States congressional district boundary maps in the State of Iowa, presented chronologically. All redistricting events that took place in Iowa between 1973 and 2013 are shown.

Year	Statewide map
1973–1982	
1983–1992	
1993–2002	
2003–2013	
2013–2023	
Since 2023	

== Obsolete districts ==
- Iowa Territory's at-large congressional district, obsolete since statehood
- Iowa's at-large congressional district (1846–1847)
- Iowa's 5th congressional district, obsolete since the 2010 census
- Iowa's 6th congressional district, obsolete since the 1990 census
- Iowa's 7th congressional district, obsolete since the 1970 census
- Iowa's 8th congressional district, obsolete since the 1960 census
- Iowa's 9th congressional district, obsolete since the 1940 census
- Iowa's 10th congressional district, obsolete since the 1930 census
- Iowa's 11th congressional district, obsolete since the 1930 census

== See also ==
- List of United States congressional districts
- Iowa's congressional delegations
