= Lloyd Thurston =

American politician (1880–1970)

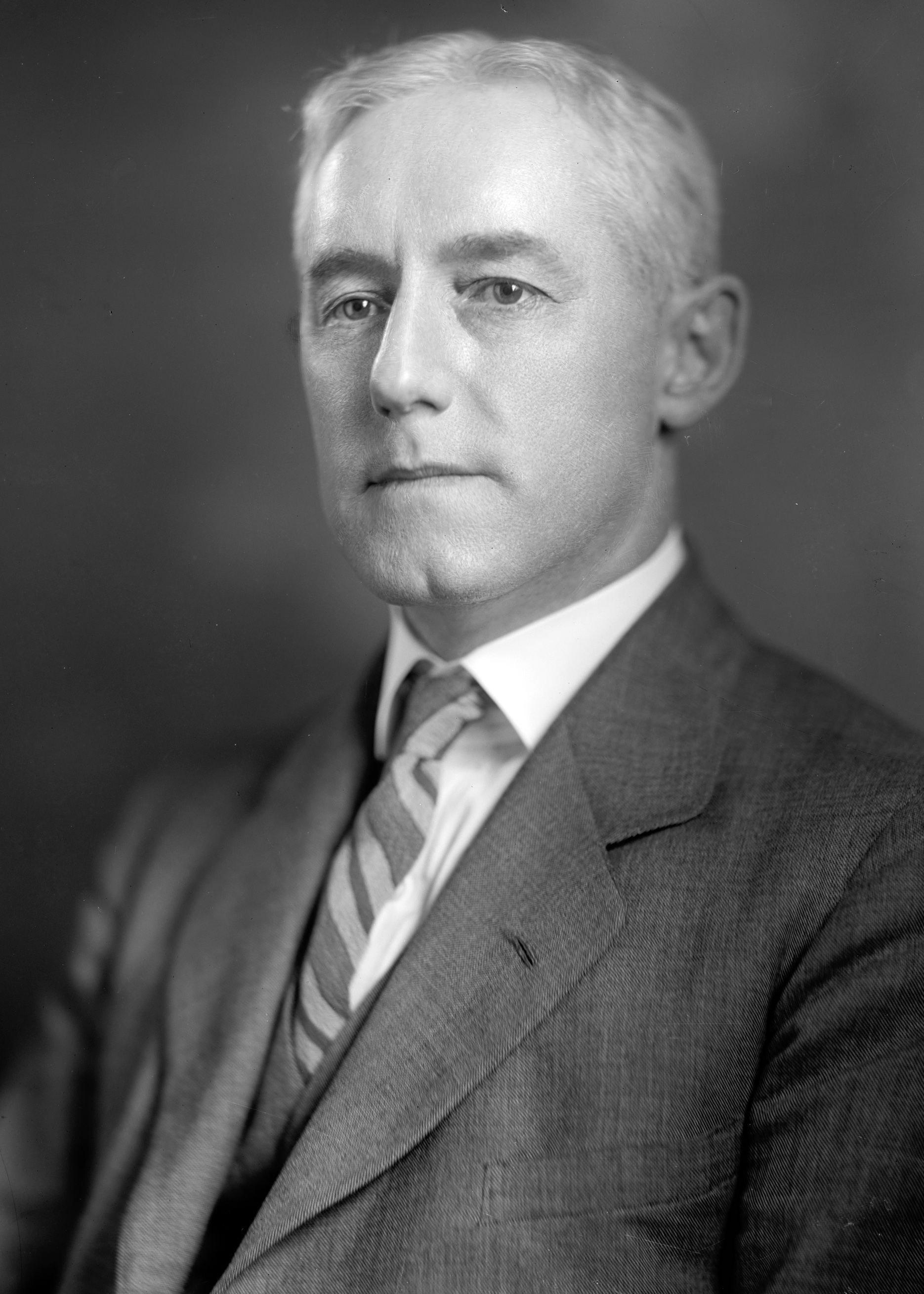

Member of the U.S. House of Representatives from Iowa's 5th district
- In office March 4, 1925 – January 3, 1939
- Preceded by: Cyrenus Cole
- Succeeded by: Karl M. LeCompte

Personal details
- Born: March 27, 1880 Osceola, Iowa, U.S.
- Died: May 7, 1970 (aged 90) Des Moines, Iowa, U.S
- Party: Republican
- Education: University of Iowa

Military service
- Allegiance: United States
- Branch/service: United States Army
- Rank: Captain
- Unit: Company I, Iowa Infantry's 51st Regiment; Company C, 26th Battalion
- Battles/wars: Spanish–American War; Philippine–American War; World War I

Lloyd Thurston (March 27, 1880 – May 7, 1970) was a seven-term Republican U.S. Representative from southern Iowa. First elected in 1924, he served until 1938, when he unsuccessfully sought election to the U.S. Senate. By his final term, he had served on three of the most powerful House committees.

Born in Osceola, Iowa, Thurston attended the public schools. During the Spanish–American War enlisted on June 13, 1898, as a private in Company I of the Iowa Volunteer Infantry's Fifty-first Regiment. He also served with this company during the Philippine–American War, and was honorably discharged on November 2, 1899.

In 1902, he graduated from the University of Iowa College of Law at Iowa City, Iowa. He was admitted to the bar the same year and commenced private practice in Osceola. He served as a prosecuting attorney for Clarke County, Iowa from 1906 to 1910.

Thurston served as captain in the Iowa National Guard from 1902 to 1906. During the First World War served with the rank of captain in Company C, Twenty-sixth Battalion, of the United States Guards, at Fort Crook, Nebraska.

After serving as member of the Iowa Senate from 1920 to 1924, he ran for a seat in the U.S. House for Iowa's 8th congressional district that was open due to the retirement of Hiram Kinsman Evans. He defeated populist Democrat Rev. LeRoy Munyon, by over 16,000 votes. After re-election landslides in 1926 and 1928, he survived a close challenge in 1930, winning by a margin of fewer than 1,600 votes.

In 1931 Iowa lost two seats in Congress, requiring redistricting by the Iowa General Assembly. Thurston's home county (Clarke County) was included in Iowa's 5th congressional district, where he ran for election in 1932. Unlike a majority of his colleagues in the Iowa house delegation, he survived the Roosevelt landslide, but by fewer than 200 votes out of over 100,000 votes cast.

In 1933, Thurston voted in favor of certain key elements of President Franklin D. Roosevelt's New Deal, including the National Industrial Recovery Act and the Agricultural Adjustment Act. In the following election, in which Democrats generally retained the seats they had won in the 1932, Thurston widened his victory margin to over 5,000 votes. In 1936 he again won by a similar margin.

By 1938, he had served on the House Committee on Rules, the House Appropriations Committee, and the House Ways and Means Committee. He was one of the leaders of the Republican opposition to Roosevelt's Judiciary Reorganization Bill of 1937, an unsuccessful effort to change the size of the U.S. Supreme Court to remove it as an obstacle to Roosevelt's social and economic legislation.

Thurston was not a candidate for renomination to his House seat in 1938, but instead ran against former one-term Republican Senator L. J. Dickinson for their party's nomination to challenge incumbent Democratic Senator Guy M. Gillette. Thurston lost to Dickinson, who in turn lost a close contest in the general election to Gillette.

Thurston resumed the practice of law in Osceola, Iowa. He died in Des Moines, Iowa on May 7, 1970.

U.S. House of Representatives
Preceded by Hiram K. Evans	Member of the U.S. House of Representatives from Iowa's 8th congressional district March 4, 1925 – March 3, 1933	Succeeded by Fred C. Gilchrist
Preceded by Cyrenus Cole	Member of the U.S. House of Representatives from Iowa's 5th congressional district March 4, 1933 – January 3, 1939	Succeeded by Karl M. LeCompte
