= Iowa's 8th congressional district =

Former congressional district

- Obsolete district
- Created: 1870
- Eliminated: 1960
- Years active: 1873–1963

Iowa's 8th congressional district existed from 1873 to 1963. The district was configured five times. Although the district encompassed four different areas of Iowa in its ninety-year existence, it was always predominantly rural, and elected a Republican lawyer to the United States House of Representatives in all but one of 46 elections.

== Phase one: Southwestern Iowa (1873-1883) ==
Based on the 1870 census, Iowa's U.S. House delegation increased from six to nine members, requiring the Iowa General Assembly to reapportion the districts. The Assembly divided the Fifth District into two districts – the relocated Sixth District (which included the easternmost ten counties in the old Fifth, with the capital city of Des Moines) and the new Eighth District (including the remaining thirteen counties, with Council Bluffs its largest city). In this phase, the Eighth District included Union, Ringgold, Audubon, Cass, Adams, Taylor, Shelby, Pottawattamie, Montgomery, Page, Harrison, Mills, and Fremont counties.

During this period, the district was represented by Republican lawyers James W. McDill (of Union County), William Fletcher Sapp (of Pottawattamie County) and William P. Hepburn (of Page County).

== Phase two: Far Southern Iowa (1883 to 1885) ==
The 1880 census caused Iowa to receive two more seats in the House, requiring reapportionment of the state into eleven districts. The new Eighth District was made up of ten counties in Iowa's southernmost two tiers of counties. It was perhaps the most purely rural congressional district in the state, lacking any major city, and any county with more than 21,000 residents. It included Appanoose, Lucas, Wayne, Clarke, Decatur, Union, Ringgold, Adams, Taylor, and Page counties.

Only two elections were held under this configuration (in 1882 and 1884). Each time, incumbent Republican William P. Hepburn was re-elected.

== Phase three: Far Southern Iowa (1886 to 1933) ==
In early 1886 the Republican-controlled General Assembly readjusted the boundaries of the 11-district map, allegedly to increase the number of Republican victories. The immediate effect in the Eighth District, however, was an unpleasant surprise to Republican Party regulars. The General Assembly kept the boundaries of the Eighth District the same except that Fremont County was moved from the Ninth District to the Eighth. However, Fremont County resident Albert R. Anderson, a longtime Republican, ran in the general election without the Party's endorsement and on a populist, anti-Railroad platform, defeating incumbent Congressman (and Republican nominee) Hepburn in a stunning upset.

The 1886 boundaries of the district would remain in place for 45 years. Until 1900, the population of the district continued to grow gradually with the population of its county-seat small towns. However, because the district lacked any major city, it avoided the sociopolitical changes that occurred in most other Iowa congressional districts in the early twentieth century due to urban migration. The Eighth District became a relatively safe seat for incumbent Republicans.

After Hepburn's 1886 defeat, the Republican Party nominee won every general election in this district except one. Hepburn waited several years before attempting to return to Congress. However, a different winner of the Republican endorsement process, James Patton Flick (of Taylor County), defeated Anderson in the next general election. In 1892, after Flick declined to run for a third term, Hepburn recaptured his former seat. Hepburn won his party's nomination and the general election, and was re-elected seven more times. Hepburn was upset a final time in 1908, by Democrat William Darius Jamieson of Page County. After Jamieson declined to be a candidate for renomination in 1910, Republican nominee Horace Mann Towner won the seat. Following Towner's appointment as Governor of Puerto Rico in 1923 early into his sixth term, Hiram Kinsman Evans (of Wayne County) was elected to serve out the rest of the term but did not seek re-election, and was succeeded by Lloyd Thurston (of Clarke County). After re-election landslides in 1926 and 1928, Thurston survived a close challenge in 1930.

Residents of Eighth District counties had greater per capita influence because of the Iowa General Assembly's failure to redistrict in response to population shifts reflected in 1910 and 1920 censuses. The population of every Eighth District county except Appanoose declined between 1900 and 1920, while Iowa's overall population increased. As a result, the Eighth District's total population in 1920 was approximately 185,000, while a perfectly balanced reapportionment plan in 1921 would have created eleven districts with about 218,000 residents each.

== Phase four: North Central Iowa (1933 to 1943) ==
Due to the 1930 census, Iowa lost seats in Congress for the first time. It lost two seats, forcing the Republican-dominated 1931 General Assembly to adopt a nine-district plan.

With one minor change, the old Tenth District in north central Iowa was relabeled as the new Eighth District. One county (Worth) was shifted into a different district, but the new Eighth District included all of the remaining Tenth District counties: Boone, Calhoun, Carroll, Crawford, Emmet, Greene, Hamilton, Humboldt, Kossuth, Palo Alto, Pocahontas, Winnebago, and Webster counties. Like the old Eighth District, the new Eighth District was one of the most rural districts in the state. Since 1856, the area had elected only Republicans to the House. As the Eighth, that tradition continued. The area's incumbent representative, Republican Fred C. Gilchrist of Pocahontas County, won every election during this phase, and was one of only two Republican incumbents in Iowa to survive both Roosevelt-era landslides in 1932 and 1934.

== Phase five: Northwestern Iowa (1943 to 1963) ==
The 1940 census cost Iowa one of its nine seats in the House, and forced the 1941 General Assembly to adopt the state's first eight-district plan. Republicans again dominated the General Assembly after a rare period of Democratic power in the mid-1930s, and adopted a plan that made it especially difficult for the state's two Democratic congressmen to keep their seats. The former Ninth District, in Iowa's northwestern corner and held by Democrat Vincent Harrington, was relabeled as the new Eighth District, but with one politically significant change. The new Eighth included Sac, Buena Vista, Clay, Dickinson, Osceola, O'Brien, Cherokee, Ida, Monona, Woodbury, Plymouth, Sioux, and Lyon counties of the former Ninth District. However, the General Assembly moved into the Seventh District Monona County, which had put Harrington over the top in his close 1940 re-election race. This change left Harrington especially vulnerable to defeat. Harrington enlisted in the U.S. Army Air Corps, then resigned from Congress and quit the 1942 race, which Republican Charles B. Hoeven (of Sioux County) won in a landslide.

The Eighth District's 1941 configuration remained in place for ten elections. Hoeven won every one. When the 1960 census cut Iowa's House delegation to seven members, the former Eighth District became the western end of the new Sixth District, which in 1962 elected Hoeven to his eleventh and final term in the House.

== List of members representing the district ==
Member (Residence)	Party	Term	Cong ress	Electoral history
District created March 4, 1873
James W. McDill (Afton)	Republican	March 4, 1873 – March 3, 1877	43rd 44th	Elected in 1872. Re-elected in 1874. Retired.
William F. Sapp (Council Bluffs)	Republican	March 4, 1877 – March 3, 1881	45th 46th	Elected in 1876. Re-elected in 1878. Lost renomination.
William P. Hepburn (Clarinda)	Republican	March 4, 1881 – March 3, 1887	47th 48th 49th	Elected in 1880. Re-elected in 1882. Re-elected in 1884. Lost re-election.
Albert R. Anderson (Sidney)	Independent; Republican	March 4, 1887 – March 3, 1889	50th	Elected in 1886. Lost re-election.
James P. Flick (Bedford)	Republican	March 4, 1889 – March 3, 1893	51st 52nd	Elected in 1888. Re-elected in 1890. Retired.
William P. Hepburn (Clarinda)	Republican	March 4, 1893 – March 3, 1909	53rd 54th 55th 56th 57th 58th 59th 60th	Elected in 1892. Re-elected in 1894. Re-elected in 1896. Re-elected in 1898. Re-elected in 1900. Re-elected in 1902. Re-elected in 1904. Re-elected in 1906. Lost re-election.
William D. Jamieson (Shenandoah)	Democratic	March 4, 1909 – March 3, 1911	61st	Elected in 1908. Retired.
Horace M. Towner (Corning)	Republican	March 4, 1911 – April 1, 1923	62nd 63rd 64th 65th 66th 67th 68th	Elected in 1910. Re-elected in 1912. Re-elected in 1914. Re-elected in 1916. Re-elected in 1918. Re-elected in 1920. Re-elected in 1922. Resigned to become Governor of Puerto Rico.
Vacant		April 1, 1923 – June 4, 1923	68th	
Hiram K. Evans (Corydon)	Republican	June 4, 1923 – March 3, 1925	68th	Elected to finish Towner's term. Retired.
Lloyd Thurston (Osceola)	Republican	March 4, 1925 – March 3, 1933	69th 70th 71st 72nd	Elected in 1924. Re-elected in 1926. Re-elected in 1928. Re-elected in 1930. Redistricted to the 5th district.
Fred C. Gilchrist (Laurens)	Republican	March 4, 1933 – January 3, 1943	73rd 74th 75th 76th 77th	Redistricted from the 10th district and re-elected in 1932. Re-elected in 1934. Re-elected in 1936. Re-elected in 1938. Re-elected in 1940. Redistricted to the 6th district.
Charles B. Hoeven (Alton)	Republican	January 3, 1943 – January 3, 1963	78th 79th 80th 81st 82nd 83rd 84th 85th 86th 87th	Elected in 1942. Re-elected in 1944. Re-elected in 1946. Re-elected in 1948. Re-elected in 1950. Re-elected in 1952. Re-elected in 1954. Re-elected in 1956. Re-elected in 1958. Re-elected in 1960. Redistricted to the 6th district.
District eliminated January 3, 1963

The district was eliminated as a result of the 1960 census. The district added Calhoun, Pocahantas, Palo Alto, Emmet, Kossuth, and Humboldt counties and was renamed the 6th district.

== See also ==
- Iowa's congressional districts
