= 4th Iowa Infantry Regiment =

- Iowa flag
- Active: August 8, 1861, to July 24, 1865
- Country: United States
- Allegiance: Union
- Branch: Infantry
- Engagements: American Civil War: Battle of Pea Ridge; Battle of Fort Hindman; Siege of Vicksburg; Siege of Jackson; Battle of Chattanooga; Battle of Lookout Mountain; Battle of Missionary Ridge; Battle of Atlanta; Battle of Jonesboro; Battle of Bentonville

The 4th Iowa Infantry Regiment was an infantry regiment that served in the Union Army during the American Civil War.

== Service ==
The 4th Iowa Infantry was organized at Council Bluffs, Iowa and mustered into Federal forces on August 8, 1861. Grenville M. Dodge was the unit's first colonel. The regiment was moved to St. Louis, where it was assigned to the Army of the Southwest; since Dodge was assigned command of the regiment's brigade, Lieutenant Colonel John Galligan took command of the regiment. The 4th Iowa fought in the Battle of Pea Ridge, where Galligan was wounded and forced to resign his commission. Following the battle, Dodge was promoted to brigadier general, while regimental adjutant J. A. Williamson was promoted to colonel. The regiment marched with the rest of the army to Helena, Arkansas, where it remained for several weeks.

The regiment was then assigned to William T. Sherman's XV Corps of the Army of the Tennessee and served in both the Vicksburg Campaign and Chattanooga campaign. In February 1864, it was sent back to Iowa for recruiting and reorganization. It returned to the Army of the Tennessee in March, serving throughout the Atlanta campaign and Carolinas campaign. After participating in the Grand Review of the Armies in May 1865, the regiment was mustered out on July 24, 1865, in Louisville, Kentucky.

== Total strength and casualties ==
Unit strength was 1,557. The regiment suffered 6 officers and 109 enlisted men who were killed in action or who died of their wounds and 2 officers and 285 enlisted men who died of disease, for a total of 402 fatalities. 338 were wounded.

== Commanders ==
- Colonel Grenville M. Dodge
- Lieutenant Colonel John Galligan
- Colonel James A. Williamson

== See also ==
- List of Iowa Civil War Units
- Iowa in the American Civil War
