= Iowa's 5th congressional district =

Former U.S. congressional district

Coordinates: 42.0694°N 94.8664°W

- Obsolete district
- Created: 1860
- Eliminated: 2013
- Years active: 1863–2013

Iowa's 5th congressional district is an obsolete congressional district in the U.S. state of Iowa. It was last represented by Republican Steve King in 2013, who continued to serve in the U.S. House of Representatives after the district's obsolescence as the representative for Iowa's 4th congressional district.

The district became obsolete for the 113th U.S. Congress as Iowa lost a seat in the U.S. House of Representatives as a result of redistricting based upon the 2010 census. Official redistricting maps divided the territory in this district in half, adding the northern portion to the 4th district and the southern portion to the 3rd district.

== History ==
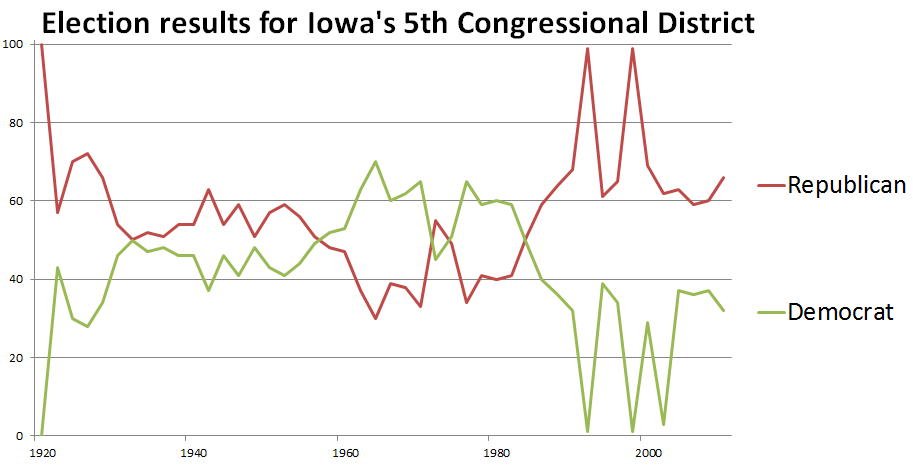
Election results, 1920 onwards

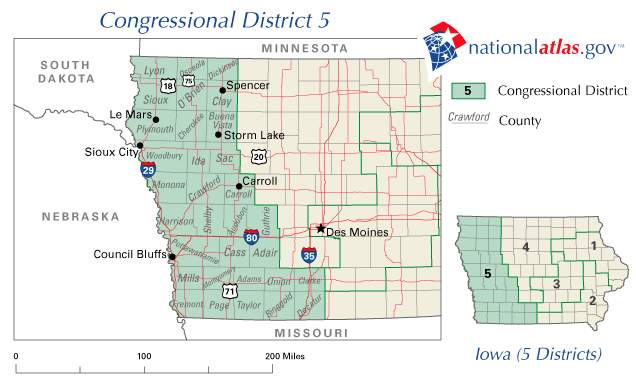
The district from 2003 to 2013

Iowa's 5th congressional district was redistricted in 1942. U.S. Representative Karl M. LeCompte from Iowa's 5th congressional district became the representative of the 4th congressional district; U.S. Representative Paul H. Cunningham was the representative from Iowa's 6th congressional district.

Iowa's 5th congressional district was also redistricted in 1972. U.S. Representative Neal Smith was taken out of Iowa's 5th congressional district and put in the 4th congressional district. U.S. Representative William J. Scherle was taken out of Iowa's 7th congressional district (which was permanently removed) and put into the 5th congressional district where he ran against future U.S. Senator Tom Harkin.

On June 22, 2001, the Iowa General Assembly passed a plan to redistrict the State of Iowa. The plan went into effect in 2002 for the 108th U.S. Congress. The prior redistricting plan was effective from 1992–2001.

The district was eliminated following the 2010 redistricting cycle.

== Presidential election results ==
Election results from presidential races:

Year	Office	Results
2000	President	George W. Bush 57% – Al Gore 40%
2004	President	George W. Bush 60% – John Kerry 39%
2008	President	John McCain 54% – Barack Obama 44%

== List of members representing the district ==
Member	Party	Term	Cong ress	Electoral history
District created March 4, 1863
John A. Kasson (Des Moines)	Republican	March 4, 1863 – March 3, 1867	38th 39th	Elected in 1862. Re-elected in 1864. Lost renomination.
Grenville M. Dodge (Council Bluffs)	Republican	March 4, 1867 – March 3, 1869	40th	Elected in 1866. Retired.
Francis W. Palmer (Des Moines)	Republican	March 4, 1869 – March 3, 1873	41st 42nd	Elected in 1868. Re-elected in 1870. Retired.
James Wilson (Traer)	Republican	March 4, 1873 – March 3, 1877	43rd 44th	Elected in 1872. Re-elected in 1874. Retired.
Rush Clark (Iowa City)	Republican	March 4, 1877 – April 29, 1879	45th 46th	Elected in 1876. Re-elected in 1878. Died.
Vacant		April 29, 1879 – December 1, 1879	46th	
William G. Thompson (Marion)	Republican	December 1, 1879 – March 3, 1883	46th 47th	Elected to finish Clark's term. Re-elected in 1880. Retired.
James Wilson (Traer)	Republican	March 4, 1883 – March 3, 1885	48th	Elected in 1882. Retired but lost contested election before end of term. (Note: The resolution of the contest was delayed until the final hours of the Forty-eighth Congress, so Frederick was not declared winner until March 4, 1885.)
Benjamin T. Frederick (Marshalltown)	Democratic	March 4, 1885 – March 3, 1887	49th	Won contested election. Re-elected in 1884. Lost re-election.
Daniel Kerr (Grundy Center)	Republican	March 4, 1887 – March 3, 1891	50th 51st	Elected in 1886. Re-elected in 1888. Retired.
John T. Hamilton (Cedar Rapids)	Democratic	March 3, 1891 – March 3, 1893	52nd	Elected in 1890. Lost re-election.
Robert G. Cousins (Tipton)	Republican	March 4, 1893 – March 3, 1909	53rd 54th 55th 56th 57th 58th 59th 60th	Elected in 1892. Re-elected in 1894. Re-elected in 1896. Re-elected in 1898. Re-elected in 1900. Re-elected in 1902. Re-elected in 1904. Re-elected in 1906. Retired.
James W. Good (Cedar Rapids)	Republican	March 4, 1909 – June 15, 1921	61st 62nd 63rd 64th 65th 66th 67th	Elected in 1908. Re-elected in 1910. Re-elected in 1912. Re-elected in 1914. Re-elected in 1916. Re-elected in 1918. Re-elected in 1920. Resigned.
Vacant		June 15, 1921 – July 19, 1921	67th	
Cyrenus Cole (Cedar Rapids)	Republican	August 1, 1921 – March 3, 1933	67th 68th 69th 70th 71st 72nd	Elected to finish Good's term. Re-elected in 1922. Re-elected in 1924. Re-elected in 1926. Re-elected in 1928. Re-elected in 1930. Redistricted to the 2nd district and retired there.
Lloyd Thurston (Osceola)	Republican	March 4, 1933 – January 3, 1939	73rd 74th 75th	Redistricted from the 8th district and re-elected in 1932. Re-elected in 1934. Re-elected in 1936. Retired to run for U.S. Senator.
Karl M. LeCompte (Corydon)	Republican	January 3, 1939 – January 3, 1943	76th 77th	Elected in 1938. Re-elected in 1940. Redistricted to the 4th district.
Paul Cunningham (Des Moines)	Republican	January 3, 1943 – January 3, 1959	78th 79th 80th 81st 82nd 83rd 84th 85th	Redistricted from the 6th district and re-elected in 1942. Re-elected in 1944. Re-elected in 1946. Re-elected in 1948. Re-elected in 1950. Re-elected in 1952. Re-elected in 1954. Re-elected in 1956. Lost re-election.
Neal E. Smith (Altoona)	Democratic	January 3, 1959 – January 3, 1973	86th 87th 88th 89th 90th 91st 92nd	Elected in 1958. Re-elected in 1960. Re-elected in 1962. Re-elected in 1964. Re-elected in 1966. Re-elected in 1968. Re-elected in 1970. Redistricted to the 4th district.
William J. Scherle (Henderson)	Republican	January 3, 1973 – January 3, 1975	93rd	Redistricted from the 7th district and re-elected in 1972. Lost re-election.
Tom Harkin (Ames)	Democratic	January 3, 1975 – January 3, 1985	94th 95th 96th 97th 98th	Elected in 1974. Re-elected in 1976. Re-elected in 1978. Re-elected in 1980. Re-elected in 1982. Retired to run for U.S. Senator.
Jim R. Lightfoot (Shenandoah)	Republican	January 3, 1985 – January 3, 1993	99th 100th 101st 102nd	Elected in 1984. Re-elected in 1986. Re-elected in 1988. Re-elected in 1990. Redistricted to the 3rd district.
Fred Grandy (Sioux City)	Republican	January 3, 1993 – January 3, 1995	103rd	Redistricted from the 6th district and re-elected in 1992. Retired to run for Governor of Iowa.
Tom Latham (Alexander)	Republican	January 3, 1995 – January 3, 2003	104th 105th 106th 107th	Elected in 1994. Re-elected in 1996. Re-elected in 1998. Re-elected in 2000. Redistricted to the 4th district.
Steve King (Kiron)	Republican	January 3, 2003 – January 3, 2013	108th 109th 110th 111th 112th	Elected in 2002. Re-elected in 2004. Re-elected in 2006. Re-elected in 2008. Re-elected in 2010. Redistricted to the 4th district.
District eliminated January 3, 2013

== Historical election results ==
Year	Party affiliation	Winner	Number of votes	Party affiliation	Loser	Number of votes	Percentage of votes
1920	Republican	James W. Good	58,197	N/A	N/A	0	100% - 0%
1922	Republican	Cyrenus Cole	32,586	Democratic	G. A. Smith	24,532	57% - 43%
1924	Republican	Cyrenus Cole	52,237	Democratic	W. N. Townsend	22,175	70% - 30%
1926	Republican	Cyrenus Cole	31,253	Democratic	C. E. Walters	12,263	72% - 28%
1928	Republican	Cyrenus Cole	54,703	Democratic	Maurice Cahill	27,893	66% - 34%
1930	Republican	Cyrenus Cole	23,221	Democratic	H. M. Cooper	19,931	54% - 46%
1932	Republican	Lloyd Thurston	51,909	Democratic	Lloyd Ellis	51,732	50.1% - 49.9%
1934	Republican	Lloyd Thurston	54,699	Democratic	Ernest H. Fabritz	48,949	52% - 47%
1936	Republican	Lloyd Thurston	63,802	Democratic	Kenneth F. Baldridge	59,971	51% - 48%
1938	Republican	Karl M. LeCompte	50,860	Democratic	Ruth F. Hollingshead	43,452	54% - 46%
1940	Republican	Karl M. LeCompte	66,940	Democratic	Roy E. Stevens	58,718	54% - 46%
1942	Republican	Paul H. Cunningham	48,578	Democratic	E. Frank Fox	28,287	63% - 37%
1944	Republican	Paul H. Cunningham	66,260	Democratic	Ralph N. Lynch	56,138	54% - 46%
1946	Republican	Paul H. Cunningham	41,679	Democratic	Vince L. Browner	28,490	59% - 41%
1948	Republican	Paul H. Cunningham	60,103	Democratic	William F. Martin	57,370	51% - 48%
1950	Republican	Paul H. Cunningham	57,429	Democratic	Gibson C. Holliday	43,105	57% - 43%
1952	Republican	Paul H. Cunningham	95,057	Democratic	Alvin P. Meyer	66,303	59% - 41%
1954	Republican	Paul H. Cunningham	61,355	Democratic	James A. McLaughlin	49,063	56% - 44%
1956	Republican	Paul H. Cunningham	85,178	Democratic	William F. Denman	81,418	51% - 49%
1958	Democratic	Neal Smith	61,693	Republican	Paul H. Cunningham	56,320	52% - 48%
1960	Democratic	Neal Smith	91,808	Republican	Floyd M. Burgeson	81,474	53% - 47%
1962	Democratic	Neal Smith	73,963	Republican	Sonja C. Egenes	43,877	63% - 37%
1964	Democratic	Neal Smith	108,212	Republican	Benjamin J. Gibson, Jr.	46,160	70% - 30%
1966	Democratic	Neal Smith	72,875	Republican	Don Mahon	46,981	60% - 39%
1968	Democratic	Neal Smith	99,586	Republican	Don Mahon	60,710	62% - 38%
1970	Democratic	Neal Smith	73,820	Republican	Don Mahon	37,374	65% - 33%
1972	Republican	William J. Scherle	108,596	Democratic	Tom Harkin	87,937	55% - 45%
1974	Democratic	Tom Harkin	81,146	Republican	William J. Scherle	77,683	51% - 49%
1976	Democratic	Tom Harkin	135,600	Republican	Kenneth R. Fulk	71,377	65% - 34%
1978	Democratic	Tom Harkin	82,333	Republican	Julian B. Garrett	57,377	59% - 41%
1980	Democratic	Tom Harkin	127,895	Republican	Cal Hultman	84,472	60% - 40%
1982	Democratic	Tom Harkin	93,333	Republican	Arlyn E. Danker	65,200	59% - 41%
1984	Republican	Jim Ross Lightfoot	104,632	Democratic	Jerry Fitzgerald	101,435	51% - 49%
1986	Republican	Jim Ross Lightfoot	85,025	Democratic	Scott Hughes	58,552	59% - 40%
1988	Republican	Jim Ross Lightfoot	117,761	Democratic	Gene Freund	66,599	64% - 36%
1990	Republican	Jim Ross Lightfoot	99,978	Democratic	Mike D. Earll	47,022	68% - 32%
1992	Republican	Fred Grandy	196,942	N/A	N/A	1,424	99% - 1%
1994	Republican	Tom Latham	114,796	Democratic	Sheila McGuire	73,627	61% - 39%
1996	Republican	Tom Latham	147,576	Democratic	MacDonald Smith	75,785	65% - 34%
1998	Republican	Tom Latham	132,730	N/A	N/A	1,041	99% - 1%
2000	Republican	Tom Latham	159,367	Democratic	Mike Palecek	67,593	69% - 29%
2002	Republican	Steve King	113,257	Democratic	Paul Shomshor	68,853	62% - 38%
2004	Republican	Steve King	168,583	Democratic	E. Joyce Schulte	97,597	63% - 37%
2006	Republican	Steve King	105,245	Democratic	E. Joyce Schulte	64,004	59% - 36%
2008	Republican	Steve King	159,430	Democratic	Rob Hubler	99,601	60% - 37%
2010	Republican	Steve King	128,363	Democratic	Matthew Campbell	63,160	66% - 32%

== Recent election results ==
=== 2002 ===
Iowa's 5th congressional district election (2002)
Party	Candidate	Votes	%
Republican	Steve King	113,257	62.15
Democratic	Paul Shomshor	68,853	37.78
No party	Others	127	0.07
Total votes		182,237	100.00
Turnout			
Republican hold			

=== 2004 ===
Iowa's 5th congressional district election (2004)
Party	Candidate	Votes	%
Republican	Steve King*	168,593	63.30
Democratic	Joyce Schulte	97,597	36.64
No party	Others	161	0.06
Total votes		266,351	100.00
Turnout			
Republican hold			

=== 2006 ===
Iowa's 5th congressional district election (2006)
Party	Candidate	Votes	%
Republican	Steve King*	121,650	58.50
Democratic	Joyce Schulte	64,181	35.56
Independent	Roy Nielsen	8,159	4.52
Independent	Cheryl Broderson	2,479	1.37
No party	Others	65	0.04
Total votes		196,534	100.00
Turnout			
Republican hold			

=== 2008 ===
Iowa's 5th congressional district election (2008)
Party	Candidate	Votes	%
Republican	Steve King*	159,430	59.80
Democratic	Rob Hubler	99,601	37.36
Independent	Victor Vara	7,406	2.78
No party	Others	180	0.07
Total votes		266,617	100.00
Turnout			
Republican hold			

=== 2010 ===
Iowa's 5th congressional district election (2010)
Party	Candidate	Votes	%
Republican	Steve King*	128,363	65.75
Democratic	Matthew Campbell	63,160	32.35
Independent	Martin James Monroe	3,622	1.86
No party	Others	94	0.05
Total votes		195,239	100.00
Turnout			
Republican hold			

== See also ==
- Iowa's congressional districts
