= Iowa's at-large congressional district =

Former congressional district

Coordinates: 42°N 93°W

- Obsolete district
- Created: 1816
- Eliminated: 1820
- Years active: 1816-1823

From December 28, 1846, to March 3, 1847, the new state of Iowa was represented in the United States House of Representatives by two representatives who had been elected on a statewide basis, rather than by districts.

This unusual situation enabled Iowa to be represented in the Twenty-ninth United States Congress from the date that it joined the Union (and before the First Iowa General Assembly took office, apportioned the state into two geographic districts, and the voters in those districts elected their representatives). The two at-large representatives, Shepherd Leffler and Serranus Clinton Hastings, had been elected in 1846, in anticipation of statehood.

This temporary solution ended in 1847. By the time that the Thirtieth United States Congress was sworn in (in December 1847), the General Assembly had divided the state's counties into two districts, which in August 1847 had elected their own representatives, William Thompson in Iowa's 1st congressional district and Leffler in Iowa's 2nd congressional district.

Before statehood, Iowa Territory had a single delegate to the U.S. House, who was also elected on an at-large basis.

== List of members of the House from the district ==
Years	Cong ress	Seat A			Seat B		
Years	Cong ress	Representative	Party	Electoral history	Representative	Party	Electoral history
December 28, 1846 – March 3, 1847	29th	Serranus Clinton Hastings (Bloomington)	Democratic	Elected in 1846 (New state). Retired.	Shepherd Leffler (Burlington)	Democratic	Elected in 1846 (New state). Redistricted to the 2nd district.

== See also ==
- Iowa's congressional districts
