= List of cemeteries in Iowa =

This list of cemeteries in Iowa includes currently operating, historical (closed for new interments), and defunct (graves abandoned or removed) cemeteries, columbaria, and mausolea which are historical and/or notable. It does not include pet cemeteries.

== Allamakee County ==
- Fish Farm Mounds State Preserve, near New Albin; NRHP-listed
- Slinde Mounds State Preserve, near Waukon; NRHP-listed
- Waterloo Ridge Lutheran Church, near Dorchester; NRHP-listed

== Carroll County ==
- Carroll City–Mount Olivet Cemetery, Carroll; NRHP-listed

== Cedar County ==
- Red Oak Grove Presbyterian Church and Cemetery, Tipton; NRHP-listed

== Cerro Gordo County ==
- Elmwood-St. Joseph Municipal Cemetery, Mason City; NRHP-listed

== Clinton County ==
- Our Savior's Kvindherred Lutheran Church, Calamus; NRHP-listed

== Dallas County ==
- Prairie Center Methodist Episcopal Church and Pleasant Hill Cemetery, Lincoln Township; NRHP-listed

== Des Moines County ==
- Aspen Grove Cemetery, Burlington; NRHP-listed

== Dubuque County ==
- Concord Congregational Cemetery, Concord Township; NRHP-listed
- Cottage Hill Methodist–Episcopal Cemetery, Concord Township; NRHP-listed
- Linwood Cemetery, Dubuque; NRHP-listed
- Mount Olivet Cemetery, Dubuque
- St. John's Cemetery, Dubuque

== Franklin County ==
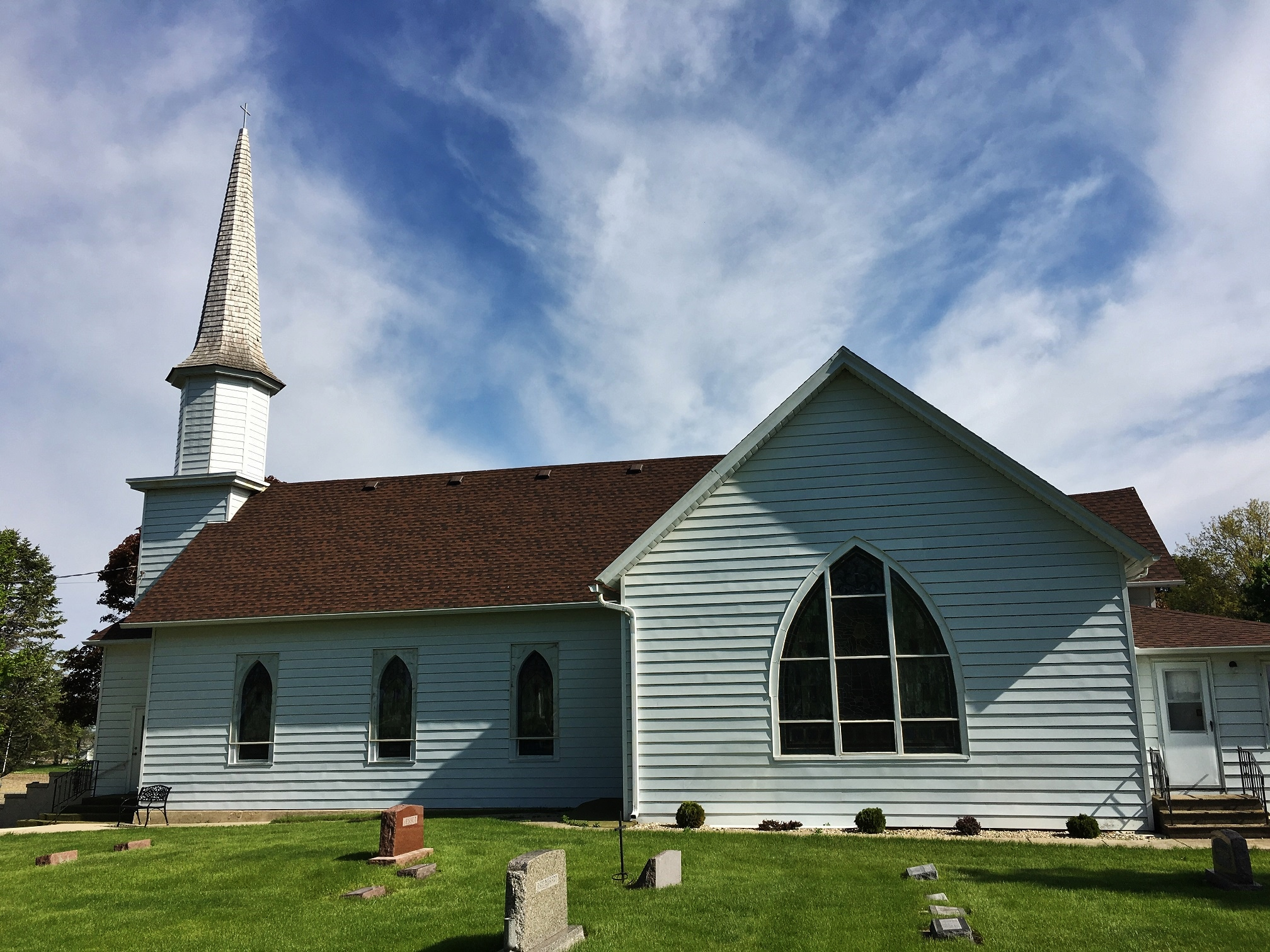
St. John's Lutheran Church near Hampton in Franklin County

- St. John's Lutheran Church, near Hampton; NRHP-listed

== Henry County ==
- Benjamin Chapel and Richwoods Cemetery, Trenton; NRHP-listed
- Hugh and Matilda Boyle House and Cemetery Historic District, Lowell; NRHP-listed

== Iowa County ==
- St. Michael's Catholic Church, Holbrook; NRHP-listed

== Jasper County ==
- German Evangelical Reformed Church, Newton; NRHP-listed

== Johnson County ==
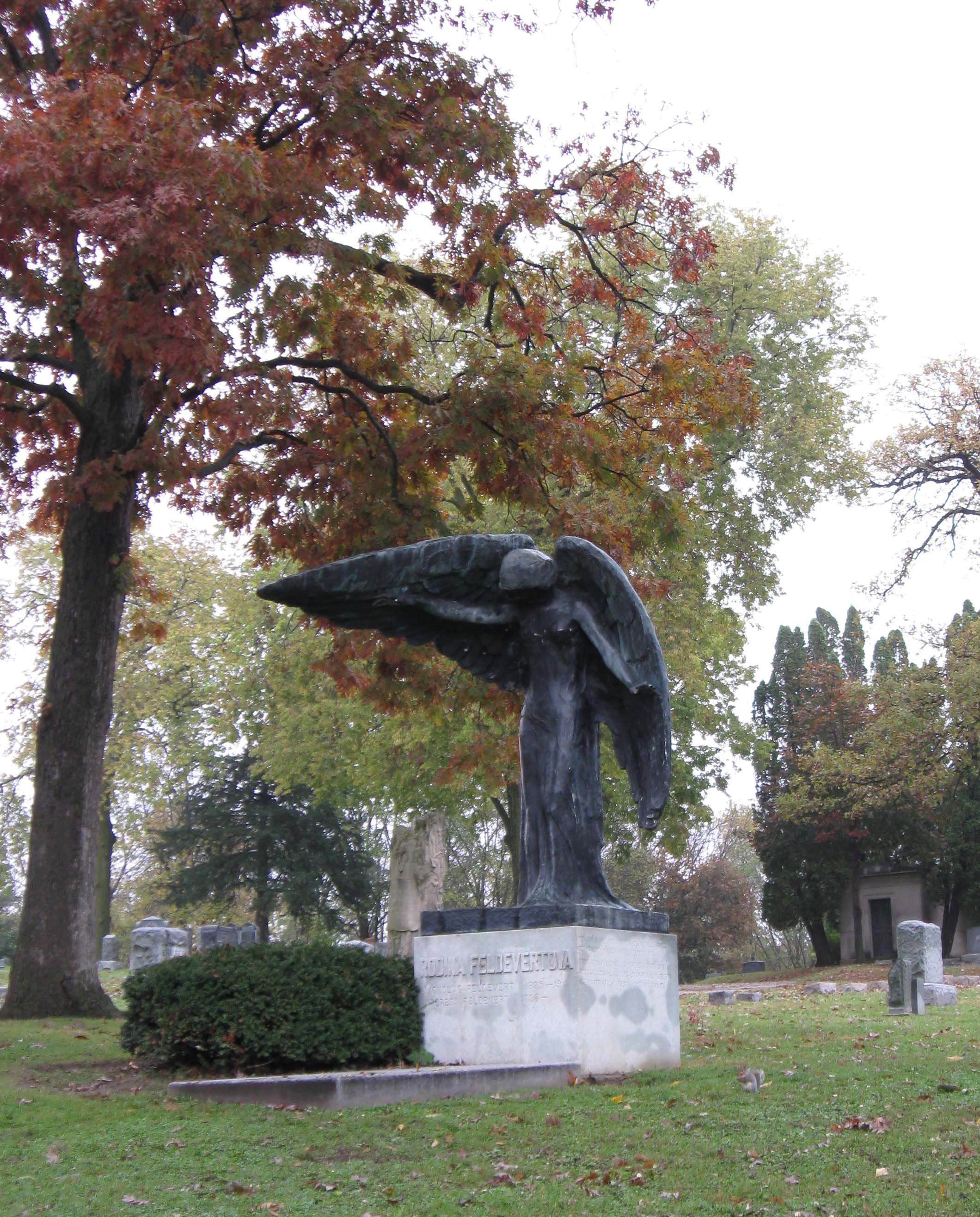
Black Angel (1913) by Mario Korbel at Oakland Cemetery in Iowa City, Johnson County

- Oakland Cemetery, Iowa City

== Jones County ==
- Anamosa State Penitentiary Cemetery (Boot Hill Cemetery), Anamosa; NRHP-listed

== Lee County ==
- Keokuk National Cemetery, Keokuk; NRHP-listed
- Sharon Cemetery Historic District, Harrison Township; NRHP-listed

== Linn County ==
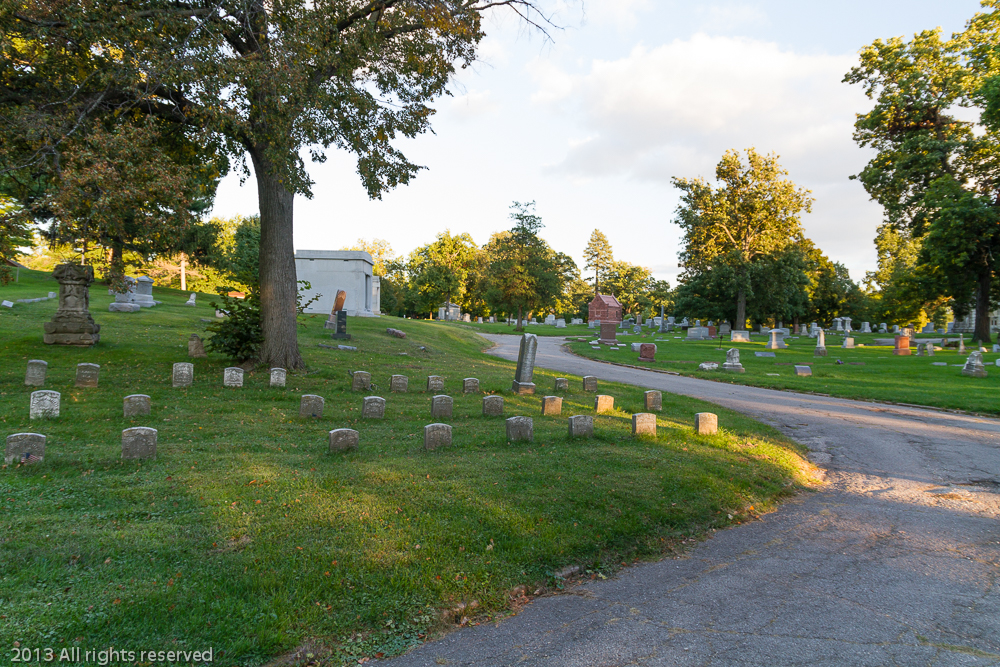
Oak Hill Cemetery Historic District in Cedar Rapids, Linn County

- Cedar Memorial, Cedar Rapids
- Oak Hill Cemetery, Cedar Rapids; NRHP-listed

== Lucas County ==
- Chariton Cemetery, Chariton; NRHP-listed

== Mahaska County ==
- Forest Cemetery Entrance, Oskaloosa; NRHP-listed
- Spring Creek Friends Cemetery, Oskaloosa; NRHP-listed

== Marion County ==
- St. Joseph's Catholic Church, Bauer; NRHP-listed

== Monona County ==
- South Jordan Cemetery, near Moorhead; NRHP-listed

== Polk County ==
- Woodland Cemetery, Des Moines

== Pottawattamie County ==
- Walnut Hill Cemetery, Council Bluffs

== Poweshiek County ==
- Kent Union Chapel and Cemetery, Brooklyn; NRHP-listed

== Scott County ==
- Mount Calvary Cemetery, Davenport
- Oakdale Memorial Gardens, Davenport
- Pine Hill Cemetery, Davenport
- Tri-City Jewish Cemetery, Davenport

== Shelby County ==
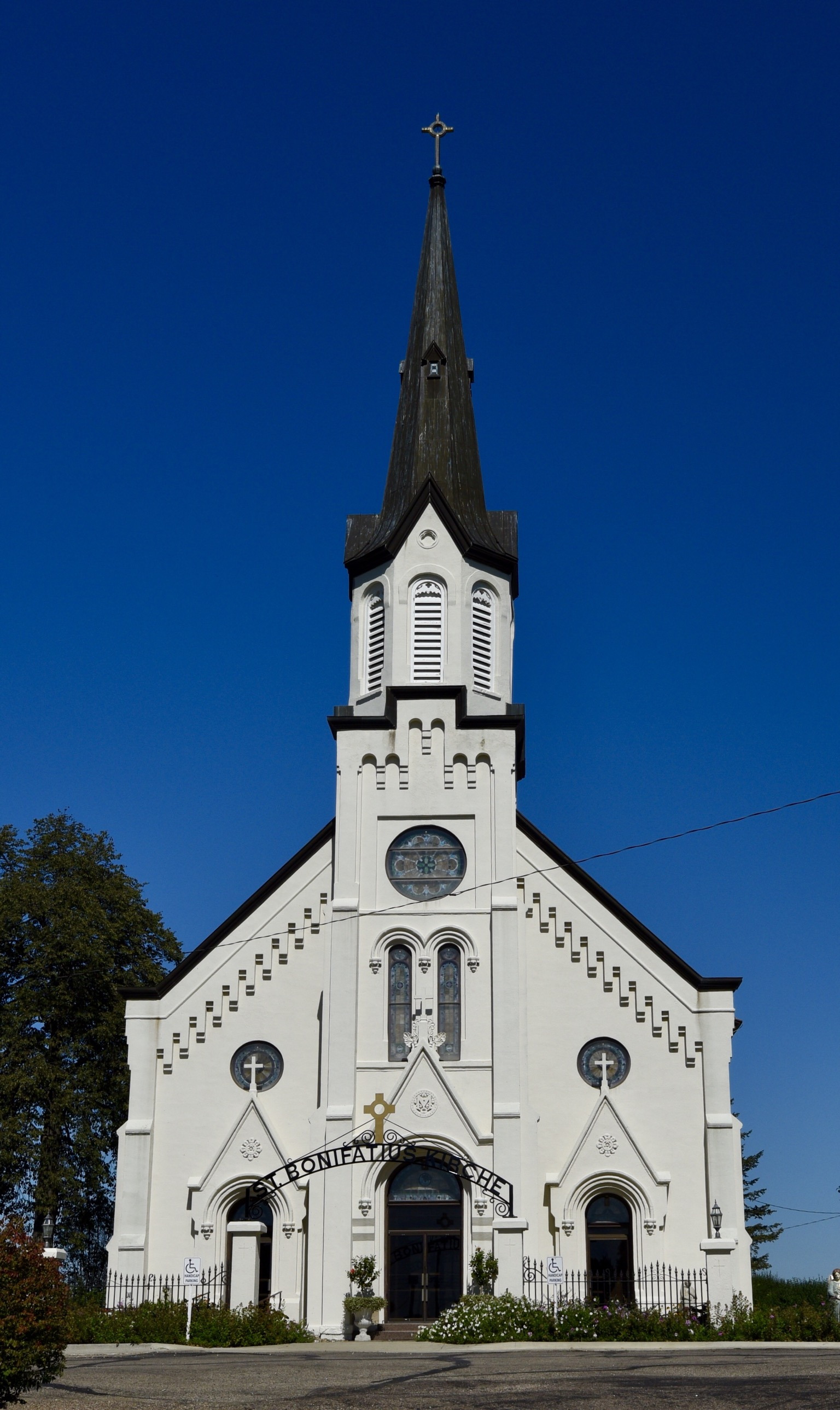
St. Boniface Catholic Church in Westphalia, Shelby County

- St. Boniface Catholic Church, Westphalia; NRHP-listed

== Story County ==
- Pleasant Grove Community Church and Cemetery, Ames; NRHP-listed

== Union County ==
- Mount Pisgah Cemetery, Mount Pisgah

== Washington County ==
- Gracehill Moravian Church and Cemetery, Washington; NRHP-listed
- Woodlawn Cemetery Gates and Shelter, Washington; NRHP-listed

== Wapello County ==
- Chief Wapello's Memorial Park, Agency; NRHP-listed
- Mars Hill, Ottumwa; NRHP-listed
- Ottumwa Cemetery, Ottumwa; NRHP-listed

== Webster County ==
- Oakland Cemetery, Fort Dodge

== Woodbury County ==
- Logan Park Cemetery, Sioux City

== See also ==
- List of cemeteries in the United States
