= Iowa's 10th congressional district =

Former congressional district

- Obsolete district
- Created: 1880
- Eliminated: 1930
- Years active: 1883–1933

Iowa's 10th congressional district existed from 1883 to 1933, when Iowa sent eleven congressmen to the United States House of Representatives. The district, known as "The Big Tenth," covered large areas of north-central Iowa.

== Makeup ==
From 1883 to 1886, the district included the north-central Iowa counties of Worth, Cerro Gordo, Franklin, Hardin, Story, Wright, Hamilton, Humboldt, Hancock, Kossuth, Winnebago, Webster, and Boone. Reapportionment in 1886 reflected the increasing population balance between eastern and western Iowa, resulting in a westward shift of the district's boundaries. From 1886 until 1933, the district was made up of Boone, Calhoun, Carroll, Crawford, Emmet, Greene, Hamilton, Humboldt, Kossuth, Palo Alto, Pocahontas, Winnebago, and Webster counties. After 1886, the boundaries of the district never changed; the Iowa General Assembly refused to reapportion its districts until the loss of two seats following the 1930 census left the State with no other choice.

== Demographics and underrepresentation ==
The district was predominantly rural, especially in its 1886 reconfiguration. During that period, it included only one of Iowa's twenty largest cities — Fort Dodge — and included counties that had been relatively slow to settle. However, by 1895 the large area of the 10th District, coupled with increased migration to its small towns, caused it to have the largest population of any of Iowa's congressional districts. By 1890, the continued disproportionate increase in the population of the 10th and 11th Districts caused some to predict that the General Assembly would need to reduce the area of each district, but no such change occurred. By 1921, the 10th District had over 100,000 more residents than the 1st District, and nearly 60,000 more than the population of an ideally-sized Iowa congressional district.

== Voting patterns ==
Every congressman elected from this district was a member of the Republican Party. As a general matter, the most influential event during each election year was not the November general election, but the Republican Party's district nominating convention (or later, the Republican primary). Two 10th district congressmen (Jonathan P. Dolliver and L. J. Dickinson) became well-known members of the U.S. Senate and sought national office.

== After dissolution ==
Under the nine-district plan adopted by the Iowa General Assembly in 1931, the boundaries of the old 10th district were preserved as the new 8th district. The last congressman elected by the old 10th district, Fred C. Gilchrist, was elected in the new 8th district in 1932. Ten years later, when the 1940 census caused Iowa to lose another seat, the new 6th district included all of the old 10th district's counties, plus Wright County. It was only after that district elected a Democrat (Merwin Coad from Boone County) and Iowa lost a seat due to the 1960 census that the Iowa General Assembly broke up the old 10th district's counties, dividing them among four districts.

== List of members representing the district ==
Member	Party	Term	Cong ress	Electoral history
District created March 4, 1883
Adoniram J. Holmes (Boone)	Republican	March 4, 1883 – March 3, 1889	48th 49th 50th	Elected in 1882. Re-elected in 1884. Re-elected in 1886. Lost renomination.
Jonathan P. Dolliver (Fort Dodge)	Republican	March 4, 1889 – August 22, 1900	51st 52nd 53rd 54th 55th 56th	Elected in 1888. Re-elected in 1890. Re-elected in 1892. Re-elected in 1894. Re-elected in 1896. Re-elected in 1898. Resigned after being appointed to the U.S. Senate.
Vacant		August 22, 1900 – December 4, 1900	56th	
James P. Conner (Denison)	Republican	December 4, 1900 – March 3, 1909	56th 57th 58th 59th 60th	Elected to finish Dolliver's term. Re-elected in 1900. Re-elected in 1902. Re-elected in 1904. Re-elected in 1906. Lost renomination.
Frank P. Woods (Estherville)	Republican	March 4, 1909 – March 3, 1919	61st 62nd 63rd 64th 65th	Elected in 1908. Re-elected in 1910. Re-elected in 1912. Re-elected in 1914. Re-elected in 1916. Lost renomination.
Lester J. Dickinson (Algona)	Republican	March 4, 1919 – March 3, 1931	66th 67th 68th 69th 70th 71st	Elected in 1918. Re-elected in 1920. Re-elected in 1922. Re-elected in 1924. Re-elected in 1926. Re-elected in 1928. Retired to run for U.S. Senator.
Fred C. Gilchrist (Laurens)	Republican	March 4, 1931 – March 3, 1933	72nd	Elected in 1930. Redistricted to the 8th district.
District eliminated March 4, 1933

== See also ==
- Iowa's congressional districts
