= Nationwide opinion polling for the 1936 United States presidential election =

Opinion polls for presidential election in United States

This article provides a list of scientific, nationwide public opinion polls that were conducted relating to the 1936 United States presidential election.

== Presidential election ==
=== Franklin Roosevelt vs Alf Landon vs William Lemke vs Norman Thomas ===
Polling aggregates key
Color	Candidate
	Franklin Roosevelt
	Alf Landon
	William Lemke
	Norman Thomas

View source data.

Polling firm	Last day of survey	Source	Franklin Roosevelt Democratic	Alf Landon Republican	William Lemke Union	Norman Thomas Socialist	Lead (%)
Election Results	November 3, 1936		60.80%	36.54%	1.95%	0.41%	24.26
Gallup	November 1, 1936		53.8%	42.8%	2.2%	0.9%	11.0
Gallup	October 25, 1936		51.4%	43.8%	3.6%	1.0%	7.6
Gallup	October 4, 1936		50.3%	44.2%	4.3%	1.0%	6.1
Gallup	September 27, 1936		49.5%	44.6%	4.7%	1.1%	4.9
Gallup	September 6, 1936		49.3%	44.3%	5.0%	1.1%	5.0
Gallup	August 30, 1936		49.2%	44.5%	4.6%	1.3%	4.7
Gallup	August 9, 1936		49.3%	44.8%	3.4%	1.5%	4.5
Gallup	July 12, 1936		51.8%	48.2%	-	-	3.6

=== Polling for the Republican Presidential Nomination ===
Polling aggregates
- Candidates
- Alf Landon
- William Borah
- Herbert Hoover
- Frank Knox
- Arthur Vandenberg
- Lester Dickinson

View source data.

Poll source	Date	Alf Landon	William Borah	Herbert Hoover	Frank Knox	Arthur Vandenberg	Lester Dickinson	Others	Leading by (points)
Gallup	December 1, 1935	33%	26%	12%	8%	3%	1%	17% (Note: Theodore Roosevelt Jr. (12%), Ogden Mills (5%))	7
Gallup	February 23, 1936	43%	28%	17%	7%	4%	1%	-	15
Gallup	April 5, 1936	56%	20%	14%	5%	4%	1%	-	36
Gallup	May 3, 1936	56%	19%	14%	5%	5%	1%	-	37
Gallup	May 31, 1936	55%	18%	14%	6%	6%	1%	-	37
