= Effie Hoffman Rogers =

American educator and newspaper editor (1855–1918)

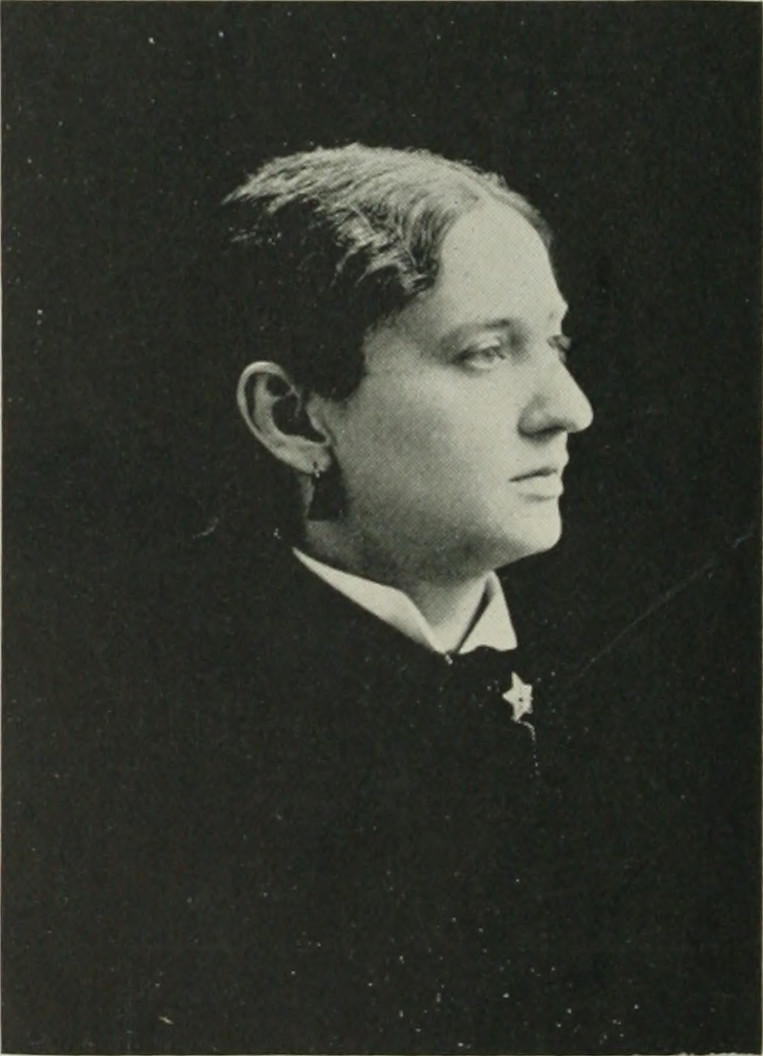
- "A Woman of the Century"
- Born: Effie Louise Hoffman; May 13, 1853/55; Ohio, U.S.
- Died: February 7, 1918; La Junta, Colorado, U.S.
- Resting place: Forest Cemetery, Oskaloosa, Iowa
- Education: Mount Pleasant Female Seminary
- Occupations: educator; editor; journalist
- Spouse: John Franklin Rogers (m. 1880; died 1883)
- Children: 2

Effie Hoffman Rogers (née, Hoffman; May 13, 1853/55 – February 7, 1918) was an American educator, editor and journalist. For several terms, she was elected county superintendent of the public schools of Mahaska County, Iowa, the first woman ever elected to that office in that county. She was also at the head of the board of education of the Oskaloosa schools, resigning her presidency of the board upon her removal to Colorado in later life. Rogers was also prominent in the woman's club movement.

Rogers was for a number of years the editor of the P.E.O. Record, the national official organ of the supreme chapter of the P.E.O. Sisterhood. She was engaged in this work while a resident in Oskaloosa, Iowa and under her management, the magazine came into prominence. Rogers was acquainted with editorial work earlier in her life through other affiliations. She was for a considerable time the associate editor of the Oskaloosa Times. The knowledge gained in newspaper work added to her success in the field of literature.

== Early life and education ==
Effie Louise Hoffman was born in Ohio, May 13, 1853/55. (Note: According to Willard & Livermore (1893), Effie was born in Jackson, Ohio, May 13, 1855. According to Reeves (1914) and Brigham (1915), Effie was born in Jackson, Ohio, May 13, 1853. According to Effie's obituary in The Oskaloosa Herald (1918), she was born in Athens, Ohio, May 13, 1855.) She was the only daughter of Dr. David Allen Hoffman, who for 61 years, was a physician engaged in active practice. He was the son of Daniel Hoffman, who was a member of the Ohio Senate for a number of years, and whose wife was Julia James, born on James Island, above Parkersburg, West Virginia, in 1800. Dr. Hoffman was educated at the Ohio University, and received his medical degree at the Western Reserve College, Cleveland, from which he graduated with honors in 1847. He died January 12, 1908. He was married to Emily Smith at Logan, Ohio, 1848. She was educated at the Female Seminary at Putnam County, Ohio. She was the daughter of John Adams Smith and Mary Emluch, whose father served in the Revolutionary War. Dr. and Mrs. Hoffman came to Oskaloosa in 1861. Effie had three brothers: Edgar, John, and Ripley. In 1861, the family moved to Iowa and settled in Oskaloosa.

Rogers received her education in the public schools. In the fall of 1869, she entered the Female Seminary at Mount Pleasant, Iowa, graduating in 1872 with the degree Bachelor of Philosophy. Rogers was socially prominent among the young people of her day.

== Career ==
Returning home, Rogers gave her time to music and literary work. She wrote for several papers and magazines. In 1877, she entered a conservatory of music and became proficient in the art. At the close of that year, she began to teach music and continued to do so for a number of years.

On April 2, 1880, at Oskaloosa, she married John Franklin Rogers, who was born in Thibodaux, Louisiana. His father was James Arthur Rogers, born in Baltimore, Maryland, a descendant of one of the old families of that state. His mother, Sarah Ball Gillis, was born in Philadelphia of an old and prominent family of that city. John worked as a cashier of the Cloud County Bank, Concordia, Kansas. The first two years of their married life were spent in Concordia, where Mrs. Rogers' time was devoted to church and society work. There she gathered around her the young girls of the town and helped them with literary and religious aspects. Each Saturday afternoon found her home filled with girls, who spent an hour in Bible reading and study.

In December, 1882, she moved with her husband to Great Bend, Kansas, where he organized the Barton County Bank. The March following, their first child, a daughter, Emily Jozelle, was born. In August, 1883, Mr. Rogers, after three days' illness, died. Widowed, Rogers at once returned to her former home in Iowa, where in August her second child, a son, Franklin Ripley, was born; he died November 25, 1883.

In 1885, she made an extended trip through the Southern States achieving considerable notability as a newspaper writer at that time. In the fall of 1885, she became city editor of the Oskaloosa Times, a Democratic newspaper. She held that position for 18 months. Next, she entered the Oskaloosa Globe office, and remained there for nearly two years.

At a salary of US$40 per month, Rogers was elected editor-in-chief and publisher of the P.E.O. Record, a secret society journal, 1888–92, but, owing to increasing demands upon her time, was obliged to give it up. She was president of the Iowa Grand Chapter, P.E.O. Sisterhood three years. Under her supervision, the organization grew and prospered. In 1890, she was elected national grand chapter president of that sisterhood.

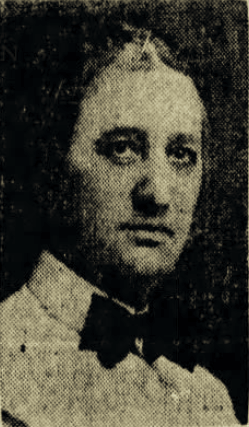
Effie Hoffman Rogers (The Des Moines Register, 1914)

In 1889, she was elected county superintendent of the public schools of Mahaska County, Iowa, beginning her term on January 1, 1890. She was the first woman ever elected to that office in that county. She was reelected in 1891 with an increased majority. Under her supervision, the county schools achieved high rank. She also served as member of the school board, vice-president of the State teachers' association, and president of the Woman's Round Table. In 1891, her name was mentioned for State Superintendent of Public Instruction. She refused at once to allow her name to be presented to the Democratic convention.

Rogers was interested in all work connected with woman's advancement. She was a member of the Woman's Christian Temperance Union (W.C.T.U.) and was, since its organization, holding important offices in that society. She was a member of the executive council of the educational department of the World's Columbian Exposition of 1893.

By 1893, she was serving as editor of the Schoolmaster, an educational journal published in Des Moines, Iowa. Rogers returned as editor and publisher of the P.E.O.'s Record in 1914–17.

Rogers much literary work. She had eight years journalistic experience as newspaper reporter and magazine writer. She was manuscript reader for the Boston school book publishing house, manager of a teachers' agency, manager of a collection and insurance agency, a representative of the Prang fine art house in New England. She wrote many verses and poems which were published.

== Personal life ==
Rogers was interested in all lines of church work, including the Young People's Society of Christian Endeavor. (Note: According to Willard & Livermore, Effie was a member of the Presbyterian church, while according to Reeves, Effie was a member of the Episcopal church.)

Effie Hoffman Rogers died in La Junta, Colorado, February 7, 1918. Interment was at Oskaloosa's Forest Cemetery. The Effie Hoffman Rogers collection is held by the University of Iowa Libraries.

The Effie Hoffman Rogers building on South First Street in Oskaloosa was named in her honor.
