= Oakland Cemetery (Fort Dodge, Iowa) =

Historic cemetery in Webster County, Iowa

- U.S. National Register of Historic Places
- U.S. Historic district
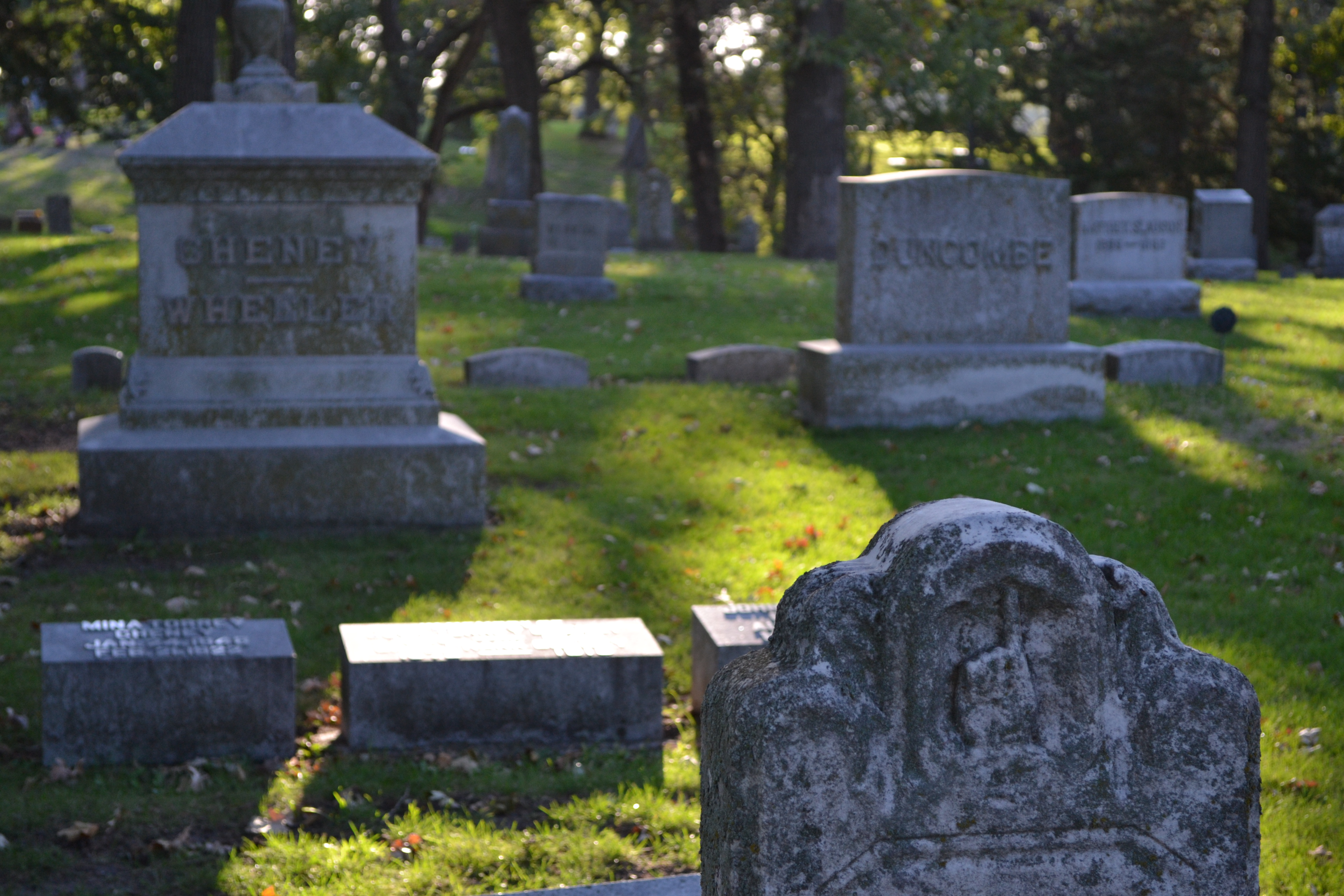

- Location within Iowa Location within the United States
- Location: 1600 N. 15th St. Fort Dodge, Iowa
- Coordinates: 42°31′18″N 94°10′42″W
- Area: 40 acres (16 ha)
- Built: 1859
- Architectural style: Egbert Bagg; William Pollock
- NRHP reference No.: 00000984
- Added to NRHP: August 25, 2000

The Oakland Cemetery is a 40-acre (16 ha) public cemetery maintained by the city of Fort Dodge, Iowa, United States. Property for the cemetery was set aside in 1859. It was laid out the same year by Egbert Bagg, an architect and civil engineer from Utica, New York. The graves and monuments are arranged around the natural contours of the hills that overlook Soldier Creek in a natural park-like setting. It is considered a good and rare example of a rural cemetery in North Central Iowa. It has been listed as an historic district on the National Register of Historic Places since 2000.

Its notable resources include:

- a Civil War memorial monument created by a local sculptor and Civil War veteran, William Pollock.
- a Potter's Field
- seven tree stump grave markers, which indicate a life cut short
- grave of Major William Williams, founder of Fort Dodge, who died in 1874
- graves of two black Civil War soldiers, with markers provided by the U.S. Government in years before 2003, with metal military marker and small cloth American flag. These are for "Joseph Kinner, Co H, 1 USCI, 1890," and "Joseph A. Palmer, Serg Co F, 54 Mass Inf.
- grave of Dr. Thomas Fitzhugh Grayson, who practiced medicine in Fort Dodge for many years after serving in the Confederate Army's 8th Virginia Infantry, and who died in 1903, and
- tablet inscribed with "Faithful Colored Servant" at grave of Agnes Grayson, a servant in the home of the Dolliver family, who died in 1935.

== Other notable burials ==
- Leander Blanden (1830–1904), American Civil War Union Brevet Brigadier General
- Cyrus Clay Carpenter (1829–1898), Governor of Iowa, 1872–1876
- Lili Damita (1901–1994), French, British, German and American film actress
- James Isaac Dolliver (1894–1978), United States House of Representatives, 1945–1957
- Jonathan Prentiss Dolliver (1858–1910), United States House of Representatives, 1889–1900; United States Senate, 1900–1910
- William Squire Kenyon (1869–1933), United States Senate, 1911–1922

== See also ==
- List of cemeteries in Iowa
