= Daniel F. Steck =

American politician (1881-1950)

Daniel Frederic Steck
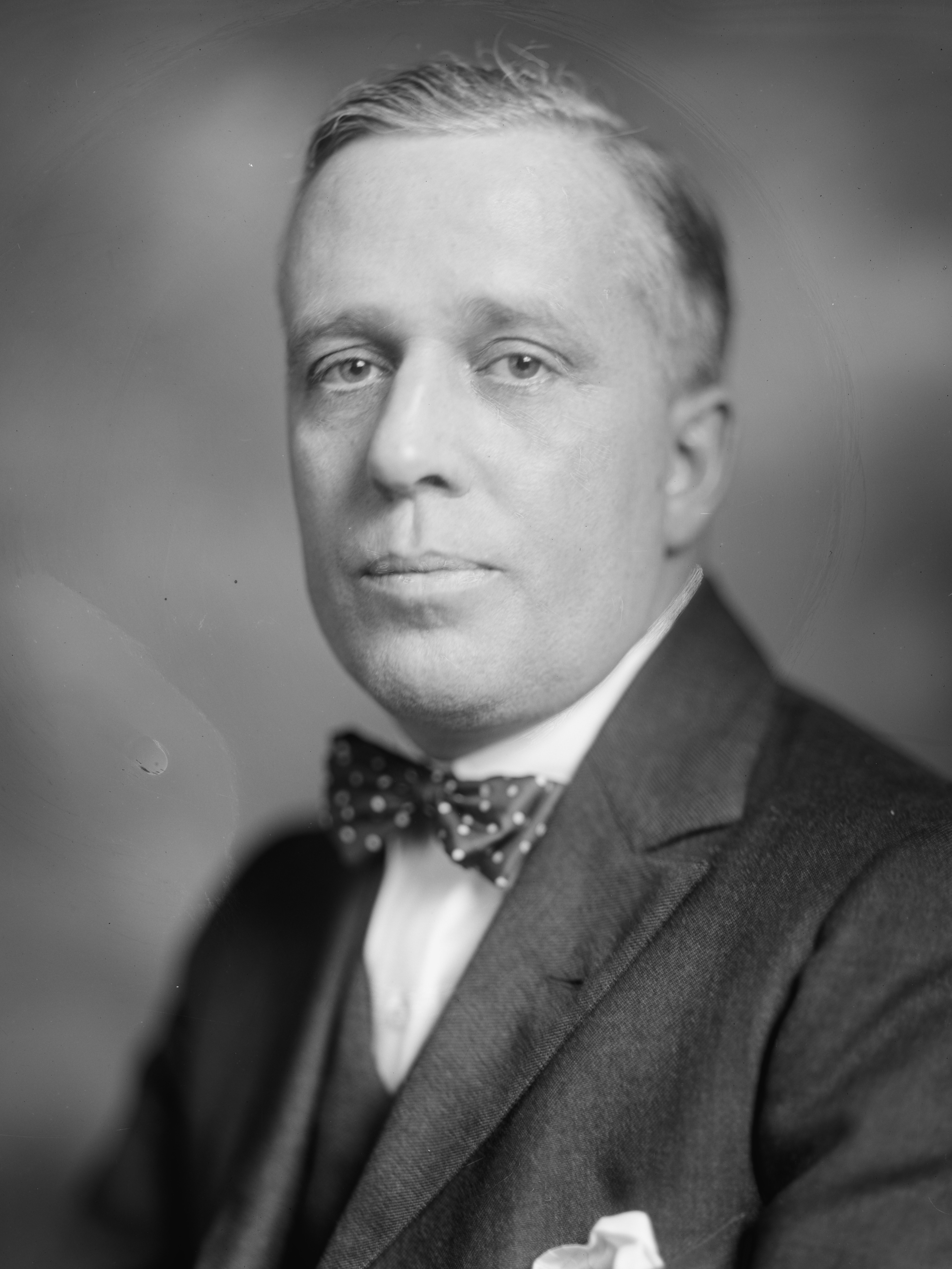

United States Senator from Iowa
- In office April 12, 1926 – March 3, 1931
- Preceded by: Smith W. Brookhart
- Succeeded by: Lester J. Dickinson

Personal details
- Born: December 16, 1881 Ottumwa, Iowa, U.S.
- Died: December 31, 1950 (aged 69) Ottumwa, Iowa, U.S.
- Party: Democratic

Daniel Frederic Steck (December 16, 1881 – December 31, 1950), was an American politician who served as the only Iowa Democrat in the United States Senate between the American Civil War and the Great Depression. He was sworn in as senator only after an extraordinary election challenge, in which his apparent defeat at the polls by a Progressive Party ally running as a Republican was reversed by a Republican-controlled U.S. Senate over seventeen months later.

== Personal background ==
Steck was born in Ottumwa, Iowa, in Wapello County. He attended Ottumwa schools. He graduated from the University of Iowa College of Law in 1906, was admitted to the bar the same year, and commenced private practice in Ottumwa. He served as Wapello County Attorney for four years. During the First World War, he served in France as a captain of the Company C outpost signal company of the Iowa National Guard's Third Infantry, then resumed the practice of law in Ottumwa.

He was married to Lucile Oehler of Iowa City, Iowa. They had one infant daughter, Edith Margaret born April 4, 1909, and who died April 5, 1909. The couple had no other children.

== Fight against the Klan ==
Upon the formation of the American Legion by World War I veterans in 1919, Steck was elected to several leadership roles, including a term as commander of the Iowa chapter, and positions on national Legion committees. At the Legion's 1923 National Convention, Steck led efforts to condemn the Ku Klux Klan, which was approaching the height of its national influence. The convention adopted a resolution that did not mention the Klan by name but that condemned organizations fostering racial, religious, or class strife.

== Senate election and service ==
In 1924, Steck won the Democratic nomination to run against incumbent Senator Smith W. Brookhart, who had been elected just two years earlier in a special election. Brookhart had run as a Republican and won the Republican nomination, but angered many within his party by crusading against business interests, demanding the withdrawal of Charles Dawes, President Coolidge's running mate, and by endorsing Progressive Party presidential candidate Robert M. La Follette. By the middle of October 1924, the editorial pages of all but one of the state's major Republican daily newspapers had encouraged Republicans to vote for Steck over Brookhart. The day after the election, newspapers reported that Steck had won. However, two days after the election, late returns from rural districts appeared to give Brookhart a tiny lead. Because Steck appeared to have lost the race by a small margin, with Brookhart getting 447,706 votes to Steck's 446,951, Brookhart initially retained his seat, and was sworn in on March 4, 1925.

Steck, however, had filed an election challenge with the Senate Committee on Elections and Privileges. His challenge succeeded on April 12, 1926, when the Senate voted by a margin of 45 to 41 to declare Steck the victor. Steck then took over the seat and served out the remainder of the term, while Brookhart immediately filed as a candidate for Iowa's other Senate seat, which he captured later that year. On other occasions the Senate has settled election disputes before a senator took office, but this is the only time the results were overturned after the senator was seated.

When he took office in 1926, Steck became Iowa's first Democratic senator since George Wallace Jones left office in 1859.

Steck maintained a low profile in the Senate. In the 71st Congress (from March 1929 to March 1931), he spoke on the Senate floor only four times.

Steck voted against the Republican-supported Smoot-Hawley Tariff Act, foreseeing that it would trigger retaliatory tariffs, and fearful of the effects of those tariffs on international markets for Iowa's farm products. However, as a Democratic senator from a state that consistently voted for Republicans, Steck's could not afford to follow a strict party line. Time magazine reported that he "votes more like a regular Republican than any other member of his party." Steck's successful election challenge also left Brookhart seeking revenge, even after Brookhart was elected again to the Senate. In 1930, Time also reported that Brookhart "vowed that Senator Steck will not return to the Capitol if he (Brookhart) 'has to turn Iowa upside down.'" Steck ran for re-election that year, but was not favored to retain his seat.

In 1930, Steck was renominated, but lost to Republican U.S. Representative L. J. Dickinson of Algona, Iowa.

== After the Senate ==
In 1931, Steck was considered the favorite for appointment by President Herbert Hoover to a seat reserved for a Democrat on the Tariff Commission. However, due to the opposition of Brookhart, Dickinson, and other Iowans, Hoover did not nominate Steck, but instead selected Ira Orburn of Connecticut.

In April 1932 Steck announced his candidacy for Brookhart's Senate seat, in an already-crowded Democratic primary. He finished second to Louis Murphy of Dubuque, who went on to win the general election.

In 1933 Steck was named by President Franklin D. Roosevelt to a board to hear appeals of Iowa veterans challenging adverse determinations regarding disability claims. However, he could not accept that appointment because U.S. Attorney General Homer Stille Cummings appointed him as a special assistant attorney general to take charge of condemnation of property needed for the expansion of the upper Mississippi River channel. Steck served in that position until 1947.

In November 1935, Steck was jokingly appointed by Iowa Governor Clyde Herring as one of his counsel, along with Minnesota Governor Floyd B. Olson, to defend him against a citizen's criminal complaint filed against Herring for unlawful gambling. The prize in the bet in question was a pig - soon named Floyd of Rosedale, and depicted in bronze after its death as a traveling trophy - wagered over the outcome of the 1935 football game between the Iowa Hawkeyes and the Minnesota Gophers. The criminal charge was dismissed on jurisdictional reasons, and Steck accompanied the pig to St. Paul to deliver it to Olson.

Steck died in Ottumwa on December 31, 1950, and is interred in Ottumwa Cemetery.

Party political offices
Preceded by Clyde L. Herring	Democratic nominee for U.S. senator from Iowa (Class 2); 1924, 1930	Succeeded by Clyde L. Herring
U.S. Senate
Preceded by Smith W. Brookhart	U.S. senator from Iowa; 1926–1931	Succeeded by Lester J. Dickinson
