= James P. Conner =

American politician

James Perry Conner
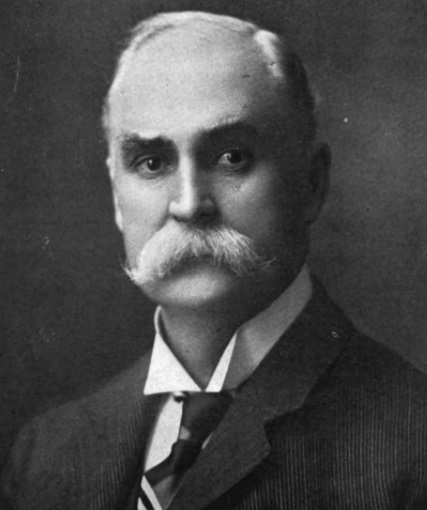
- From Volume II (1911) of History of Crawford County, Iowa

Member of the U.S. House of Representatives from Iowa's 10th district
- In office December 4, 1900 – March 3, 1909
- Preceded by: Jonathan P. Dolliver
- Succeeded by: Frank P. Woods

Personal details
- Born: January 27, 1851 Delaware County, Indiana, U.S.
- Died: March 19, 1924 (aged 73) Denison, Iowa, U.S.
- Party: Republican

James Perry Conner (January 27, 1851 – March 19, 1924) was a Republican U.S. Representative from Iowa's 10th congressional district from 1900 to 1909.

== Background ==
Born in Delaware County, Indiana, Conner attended the Upper Iowa University in Fayette, Iowa, and graduated from the University of Iowa College of Law in 1873. He was admitted to the bar and practiced in Denison, Iowa. He served as district attorney of the thirteenth judicial district of Iowa from 1880 to 1884. He was elected as a circuit judge of the thirteenth judicial district in 1884, and as a district judge of the sixteenth judicial district in 1886, serving over eight years on the bench. He served as delegate to the Republican National Convention in 1892.

== Congress ==
Connor was a former law partner and political ally of Iowa Governor Leslie M. Shaw. When U.S. Senator John H. Gear died in July 1900, Shaw was responsible for making an interim appointment to fill the seat. Connor was one of many Republicans who hoped Shaw would choose them to fill the vacancy, but Shaw instead chose Connor's congressman, Jonathan P. Dolliver, thus creating a new vacancy in the U.S. House. Dolliver's House seat (in Iowa's 10th congressional district) was filled by a direct election between candidates chosen by district conventions. On the 96th ballot, Conner received the Republican nomination over a crowded field, and was elected in the general election. After serving in the Fifty-sixth Congress, he was reelected two years later (in 1902) to the Fifty-seventh, and later to the three succeeding Congresses.

In 1908, Connor was defeated in the Republican primary by newspaper publisher Frank P. Woods, as part of a broader attempt by the party's progressive wing to displace incumbents from the more conservative "standpatter" wing. In all, Connor served in Congress from December 4, 1900, to March 3, 1909.

== After Congress ==
He resumed the practice of law in Denison, where he died on March 19, 1924. He was interred in Oakland Cemetery.

U.S. House of Representatives
Preceded by Jonathan P. Dolliver	Member of the U.S. House of Representatives from Iowa's 10th congressional district 1900–1909	Succeeded by Frank P. Woods
