= James I. Dolliver =

American politician (1894–1978)

James Isaac Dolliver
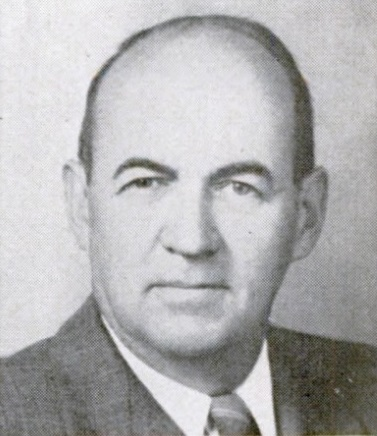
- From 1953's Pocket Congressional Directory of the Eighty-Third Congress

Member of the U.S. House of Representatives from Iowa's 6th district
- In office January 3, 1945 – January 3, 1957
- Preceded by: Fred C. Gilchrist
- Succeeded by: Merwin Coad

Personal details
- Born: August 31, 1894 Park Ridge, Illinois, U.S.
- Died: December 10, 1978 (aged 84) Rolla, Missouri, U.S.
- Resting place: Oakland Cemetery, Fort Dodge, Iowa, U.S.
- Party: Republican
- Education: University of Chicago

James Isaac Dolliver (August 31, 1894 – December 10, 1978) served six terms as a Republican U.S. Representative from Iowa's 6th congressional district, beginning in 1944. He was the nephew of U.S. Senator Jonathan Prentiss Dolliver of Iowa.

Born in Park Ridge, Illinois, to Rev. and Mrs. Robert H. Dolliver, he received elementary education in Illinois schools at Lanark, Pawpaw, Eochelle, Lockport and Joliet before moving to Hot Springs, South Dakota. He graduated from Morningside College, Sioux City, Iowa, in 1915. He taught school at Alta, Iowa, and Humboldt, Iowa, until 1918, when he enlisted in the U.S. Army and was enrolled in signal officers' training school at New Haven, where he was when the First World War ended.

Following the conclusion of his military service, he attended the University of Chicago Law School, where he became a member of the Delta Chi fraternity, and graduated in 1921. He was admitted to the bar the same year and commenced private practice in Chicago.

Dolliver moved to Fort Dodge, Iowa in 1922. He served as the County Attorney for Webster County, Iowa from 1924 to 1929, then returned to private practice. He served on the school board of the Fort Dodge School District between 1938 and 1945. He also served a term as commander of the Iowa American Legion.

In 1942, Dolliver ran against Governor George A. Wilson and two others for the Republican nomination for U.S. Senate. In the primary election, Dolliver finished a distant third.

Two years later, Dolliver ran for the U.S. House for a seat held by Fred C. Gilchrist, an incumbent member of Dolliver's own party who was then completing his seventh term in office. In a primary characterized by light turnout, Dolliver defeated Gilchrist in a close race. He then ran against Charles Hanna in the general election, defeating him handily. Dolliver was re-elected five times before losing in 1956 to Democrat Merwin Coad, in an extraordinarily close race. Coad won by 198 votes, out of over 129,000 cast. In all, Dolliver served from January 3, 1945, to January 3, 1957.

After his loss, he served as regional legal counsel for the International Cooperation Administration in the Middle East from 1957 until his retirement in 1959. In retirement, he resided in Spirit Lake, Iowa.

Dolliver died in Rolla, Missouri on December 10, 1978. He was interred in Oakland Cemetery, Fort Dodge, Iowa.

U.S. House of Representatives
Preceded by Fred C. Gilchrist	Member of the U.S. House of Representatives from Iowa's 6th congressional district 1945 – 1957 (obsolete district)	Succeeded by Merwin Coad
