= Jonathan P. Dolliver =

American politician

Jonathan Prentiss Dolliver
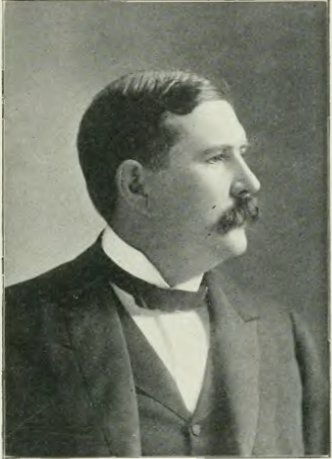

United States Senator from Iowa
- In office August 22, 1900 – October 15, 1910
- Preceded by: John H. Gear
- Succeeded by: Lafayette Young

Member of the U.S. House of Representatives from Iowa's 10th district
- In office March 4, 1889 – August 22, 1900
- Preceded by: Adoniram J. Holmes
- Succeeded by: James P. Conner

Personal details
- Born: February 6, 1858 Kingwood, Virginia (now West Virginia)
- Died: October 15, 1910 (aged 52) Fort Dodge, Iowa, U.S.
- Party: Republican

Jonathan Prentiss Dolliver (February 6, 1858 – October 15, 1910) was a Republican orator, U.S. representative, then U.S. senator from Iowa at the turn of the 20th century. In 1900 and 1908 Republican National Conventions, he was promoted as a vice-presidential candidate, but he was never chosen.

== Background ==
Dolliver was born in 1858 near Kingwood in Preston County, a Virginia county that would refuse to join the Confederacy and would instead remain in the Union as part of the new state of West Virginia. He attended the public schools and graduated from the West Virginia University at Morgantown in 1876. After studying law, Dolliver was admitted to the bar in 1878, and commenced practice in Fort Dodge, Iowa. He served as city solicitor of Fort Dodge from 1880 to 1887.

In 1884, as a twenty-six-year-old, Dolliver received national attention for his skills as an orator, when campaigning around the nation on behalf of the Republican presidential candidate James G. Blaine. A famous political quotation is attributed to Dolliver. Referring to his adopted state's traditional allegiance with the Republican Party, Dolliver (son of a Methodist minister) said, "Iowa will go Democratic when Hell goes Methodist."

== U.S. House ==
In 1888, Dolliver challenged the incumbent congressman for Iowa's 10th congressional district, Adoniram J. Holmes, for the Republican nomination. After 110 ballots in the district nominating convention, Dolliver won. He easily won the general election and began to represent in north-central Iowa in the United States House of Representatives in 1889. He was re-elected to the House five times. He served as chairman of the House Committee on Expenditures in the Fifty-sixth Congress.

In the 1900 presidential election, President William McKinley needed a successor to replace his first vice president, Garret Hobart, who died in November 1899. Dolliver was considered by some as a favorite to win the spot at the 1900 Republican National Convention. However, New York Governor Theodore Roosevelt, renowned for his victory in the Battle of San Juan Hill in the Spanish–American War, soon emerged as the leading candidate for that position. Dolliver stepped aside.

== U.S. Senate ==
The following month (July 1900), Iowa U.S. Senator John H. Gear died while in office. Iowa Governor Leslie M. Shaw selected Dolliver to replace Gear. Dolliver was twice re-elected to the Senate by the Iowa General Assembly. In the Senate, he served as chairman of the Committee on Pacific Railroads in the Fifty-seventh through Fifty-ninth Congresses, Committee on Education and Labor in the Fifty-ninth and Sixtieth Congresses, and the Committee on Agriculture and Forestry in the Sixty-first Congress.

In the 1908 presidential election, Dolliver's name was again touted as a potential vice-presidential candidate, this time on the ticket with William Howard Taft. As the convention approached Dolliver indicated that he preferred to remain in the Senate. In response to further pressure (and suggestions of support from the Roosevelt White House), he softened his position by indicating that he would not refuse the position if offered it. However, the Convention instead chose James S. Sherman.

During Dolliver's service in the Senate, Iowa Republicans were divided between a conservative old guard that had dominated state politics since the Civil War, and a new progressive wing led by Albert B. Cummins, a lawyer and (after 1902) Governor of Iowa. The flash point for this division was Cummins' effort in 1908 to join Dolliver in the Senate by challenging legendary Senator William B. Allison in the Republican primary. Dolliver had a national reputation as a progressive. However, he supported Allison, who ultimately prevailed in the primary but died shortly thereafter, and was succeeded by Cummins. Dolliver soon reconciled with Cummins, and became increasingly aligned with Cummins in his party's progressive wing.

== Death and legacy ==
Dolliver died in office on October 15, 1910. He was interred in Oakland Cemetery in Fort Dodge, Iowa.

The small town of Dolliver, Iowa, established on a new railroad line in 1899, and Dolliver Memorial State Park south of Fort Dodge, were named in honor of him.

His nephew, James I. Dolliver, represented a similar area in Iowa in the U.S. House from 1945 to 1957.

== See also ==
- List of members of the United States Congress who died in office (1900–1949)

U.S. House of Representatives
Preceded by Adoniram J. Holmes	Member of the U.S. House of Representatives from Iowa's 10th congressional district 1889–1900	Succeeded by James P. Conner
U.S. Senate
Preceded by John H. Gear	U.S. senator from Iowa; 1900–1910	Succeeded by Lafayette Young
