= Fred C. Gilchrist =

American politician (1868–1950)

Fred Gilchrist
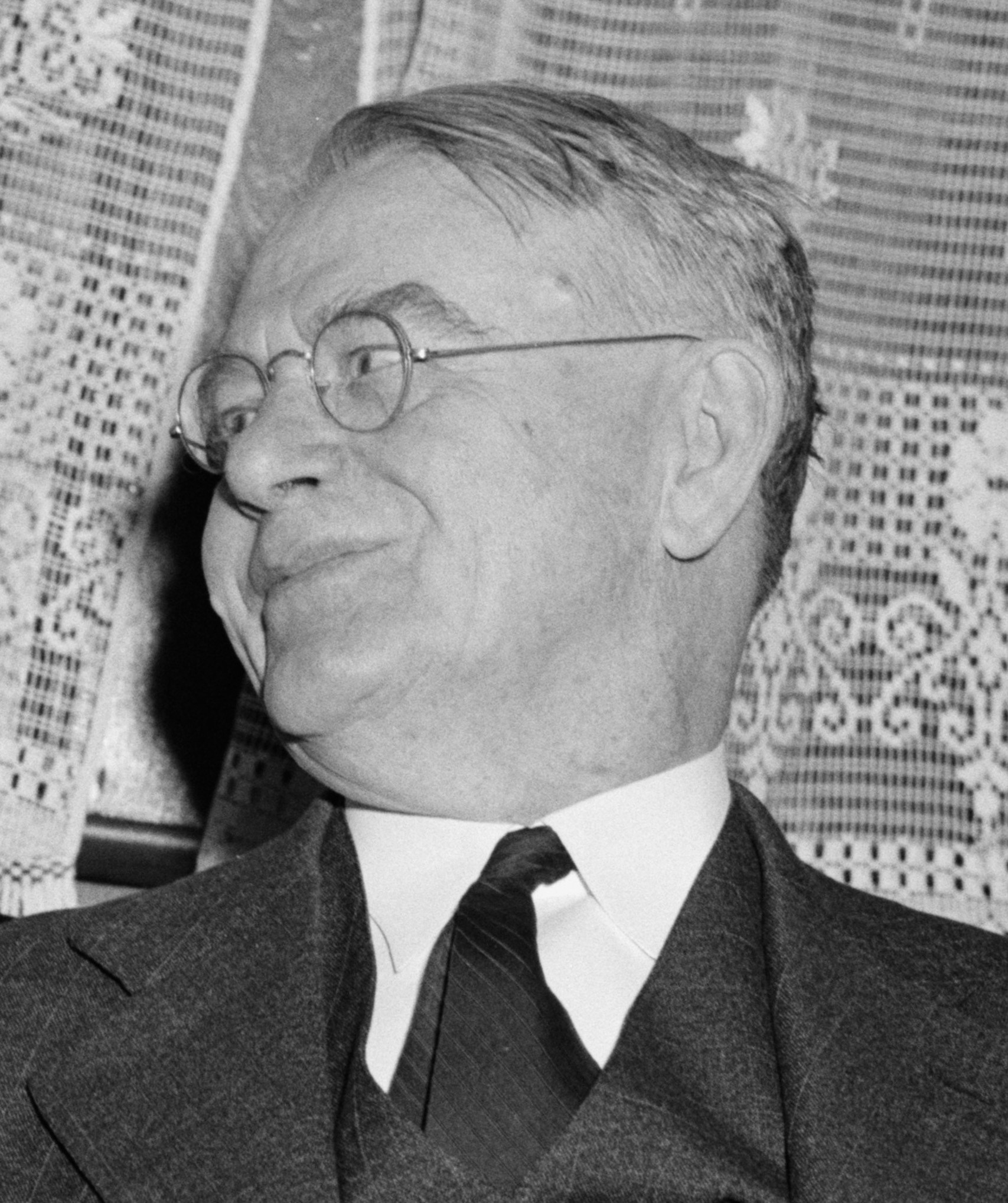

Member of the U.S. House of Representatives from Iowa
- In office March 4, 1931 – January 3, 1945
- Preceded by: L. J. Dickinson
- Succeeded by: James I. Dolliver
- Constituency: 10th district (1931–1933); 8th district (1933–1943); 6th district (1943–1945)

Member of the Iowa Senate
- In office 1923–1931

Member of the Iowa House of Representatives
- In office 1902–1904

Personal details
- Born: Fred Cramer Gilchrist; June 2, 1868 California, Pennsylvania, U.S.
- Died: March 10, 1950 (aged 81) Laurens, Iowa, U.S
- Resting place: Laurens Cemetery
- Party: Republican
- Education: University of Iowa
- Profession: Educator and academic administrator

Fred Cramer Gilchrist (June 2, 1868 – March 10, 1950) was an American educator who served as a seven-term Republican U.S. Representative from Iowa, from 1931 to 1945.

== Early life and education ==
Born in California, Pennsylvania, in Washington County, Pennsylvania, Gilchrist moved with his parents to Cedar Falls, Iowa, in 1871. He attended the public schools. He graduated from State Teachers' College, Cedar Falls, Iowa, in 1886. From 1886 to 1890, he was a teacher and superintendent of two school districts in Pocahontas County, Iowa – Laurens, Iowa, and Rolfe, Iowa.

== Early career ==
From 1890 to 1892 he served as that County's superintendent of schools. Leaving school administration for law school, he graduated from the University of Iowa College of Law at Iowa City in 1893, and was admitted to the bar that year. He then returned home and commenced private practice in Laurens.

== Political career ==
He served as a member of the Iowa House of Representatives for one term, in 1902–1904. He also served as president of the board of education of Laurens from 1905 to 1928. Returning to legislative service, he served the Iowa Senate from 1923 to 1931.

=== Congress ===
Between 1930 and 1944, Gilchrist served seven terms as a Republican U.S. Representative from Iowa. During his service, the size of Iowa's house delegation shrank from eleven (in 1931) to nine (in 1933) and then to eight (in 1943), requiring redistricting before the 1932 and 1942 elections. Thus, without ever changing addresses, Gilchrist represented three different congressional districts. In 1930, he ran for and won the seat in Iowa's 10th congressional district that L. J. Dickinson vacated in his successful run for the U.S. Senate.

Two years later, with his home county (Pocahontas) now in Iowa's 8th congressional district, Gilchrist was one of three Iowa Republican House candidates to survive the Roosevelt landslide. He was re-elected four more times from that district, only once (in 1934) in a close race. In 1942, following the next redistricting, Pocahontas County was now in Iowa's 6th congressional district, where Gilchrist won re-election once. However, in 1944, he was challenged for the Republican nomination by James I. Dolliver of Fort Dodge, Iowa. In a primary election characterized by low turnout, Dolliver defeated Gilchrist, and went on to win the general election. In all, Gilchrist served in Congress from March 4, 1931, to January 3, 1945.

== Later career and death ==
Upon his return to Laurens, Gilchrist resumed the practice of law. He died in Laurens on March 10, 1950, and was interred in Laurens Cemetery.

U.S. House of Representatives
Preceded by L. J. Dickinson	Member of the U.S. House of Representatives from Iowa's 10th congressional district 1931 – 1933 (obsolete district)	Succeeded by (eliminated)
Preceded by Lloyd Thurston	Member of the U.S. House of Representatives from Iowa's 8th congressional district 1933 – 1943 (obsolete district)	Succeeded by Charles B. Hoeven
Preceded by Paul H. Cunningham	Member of the U.S. House of Representatives from Iowa's 6th congressional district 1943 – 1945 (obsolete district)	Succeeded by James I. Dolliver
