= Adoniram J. Holmes =

American politician (1842–1902)

Adoniram Judson Holmes
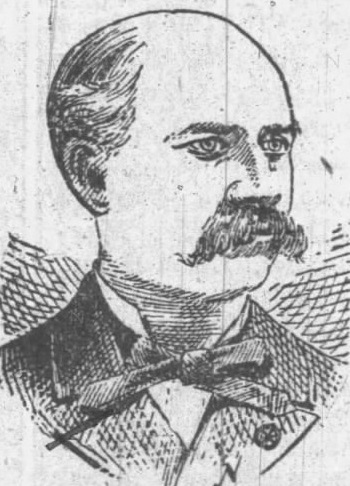
- Lancaster Teller (Lancaster, Wisconsin), June 26, 1890

Sergeant at Arms of the United States House of Representatives
- In office December 2, 1889 – December 8, 1891
- Leader: Thomas Brackett Reed
- Preceded by: John P. Leedom
- Succeeded by: Samuel S. Yoder

Member of the U.S. House of Representatives from Iowa's 10th district
- In office March 4, 1883 – March 3, 1889
- Preceded by: New District
- Succeeded by: Jonathan P. Dolliver

Member of the Iowa House of Representatives
- In office 1882-1883

Personal details
- Born: March 2, 1842 Wooster, Ohio, U.S.
- Died: January 21, 1902 (aged 59) Clarinda, Iowa
- Party: Republican
- Spouse: Emma Folsom Holmes
- Children: Lulu Emma; Judson Harold; Clarence Folsom
- Education: University of Michigan Law School
- Profession: Attorney, politician

Military service
- Allegiance: United States of America
- Branch/service: Union Army
- Rank: Private; Second Lieutenant; First Lieutenant
- Unit: 24th Wisconsin Volunteer Infantry Regiment
- Commands: Company K Company D
- Battles/wars: Civil War

Adoniram Judson Holmes (March 2, 1842 – January 21, 1902) a Republican, was the first U.S. Representative from Iowa's 10th congressional district.

== Early life ==
Born in Wooster, Ohio, Holmes moved with his parents to Palmyra, Wisconsin, in 1853. He attended the common schools, and entered Milton College of Milton, Wisconsin, but left in 1862 after the outbreak of the Civil War, to enter the Union Army. He enlisted as a private in Company D, 24th Wisconsin Volunteer Infantry Regiment. He was promoted to 2nd Lieutenant of Company F on March 7, 1864, to 1st Lieutenant of Company K on May 12, 1865, and was honorably mustered out on July 27, 1865. He married Emma Folsom Holmes, and they had three children, Lulu Emma, Judson Harold, and Clarence Folsom.

== Career ==
After the war Holms completed his studies in Milton College. Returning to Janesville he studied law and was admitted to the bar, but afterwards took the full course from the University of Michigan Law School, graduating in 1867. He commenced practice in Boone, Iowa, in 1868 in partnership with another young lawyer, L. W. Reynolds. In 1880 and 1881, he was the mayor of Boone. He also served as a member of the Iowa House of Representatives in 1882 and 1883.

== Political career ==
Iowa received a tenth and eleventh seat in the U.S. House as a result of the 1880 Census. The Iowa General Assembly created the new 10th congressional district from counties in the old 4th and 9th congressional districts, including Boone County, where Holmes lived. In 1882, Holmes won the Republican nomination in the new district, and won the general election, and was elected to the 48th United States Congress.Twice he was re-elected, serving in the Forty-ninth and Fiftieth Congresses. He held the seat from March 4, 1883, to March 3, 1889. However, when running for a fourth term in 1888, he was challenged in the district convention by future U.S. Senator Jonathan P. Dolliver. After 110 ballots in the district nominating convention, Dolliver won.

After his defeat, Holmes went to work for Congress. He was chosen as Sergeant at Arms of the House of Representatives in the Fifty-first Congress, at the urging of Congressman David B. Henderson of Iowa's 3rd congressional district. He then resumed the practice of law in Boone, where he served as county attorney from 1896 to 1899.

== Death ==
Holmes died in Clarinda, Page County, Iowa, on January 21, 1902 (age 59 years, 325 days). He is interred at Linwood Park Cemetery, Boone, Iowa.

U.S. House of Representatives
Preceded by New District	Member of the U.S. House of Representatives from Iowa's 10th congressional district 1883–1889	Succeeded by Jonathan P. Dolliver
Preceded by Samuel S. Yoder	Sergeant at Arms of the United States House of Representatives; 1889–1891	Succeeded by Benjamin F. Russell
