= Frank P. Woods =

American politician (1868–1944)

Frank Plowman Woods
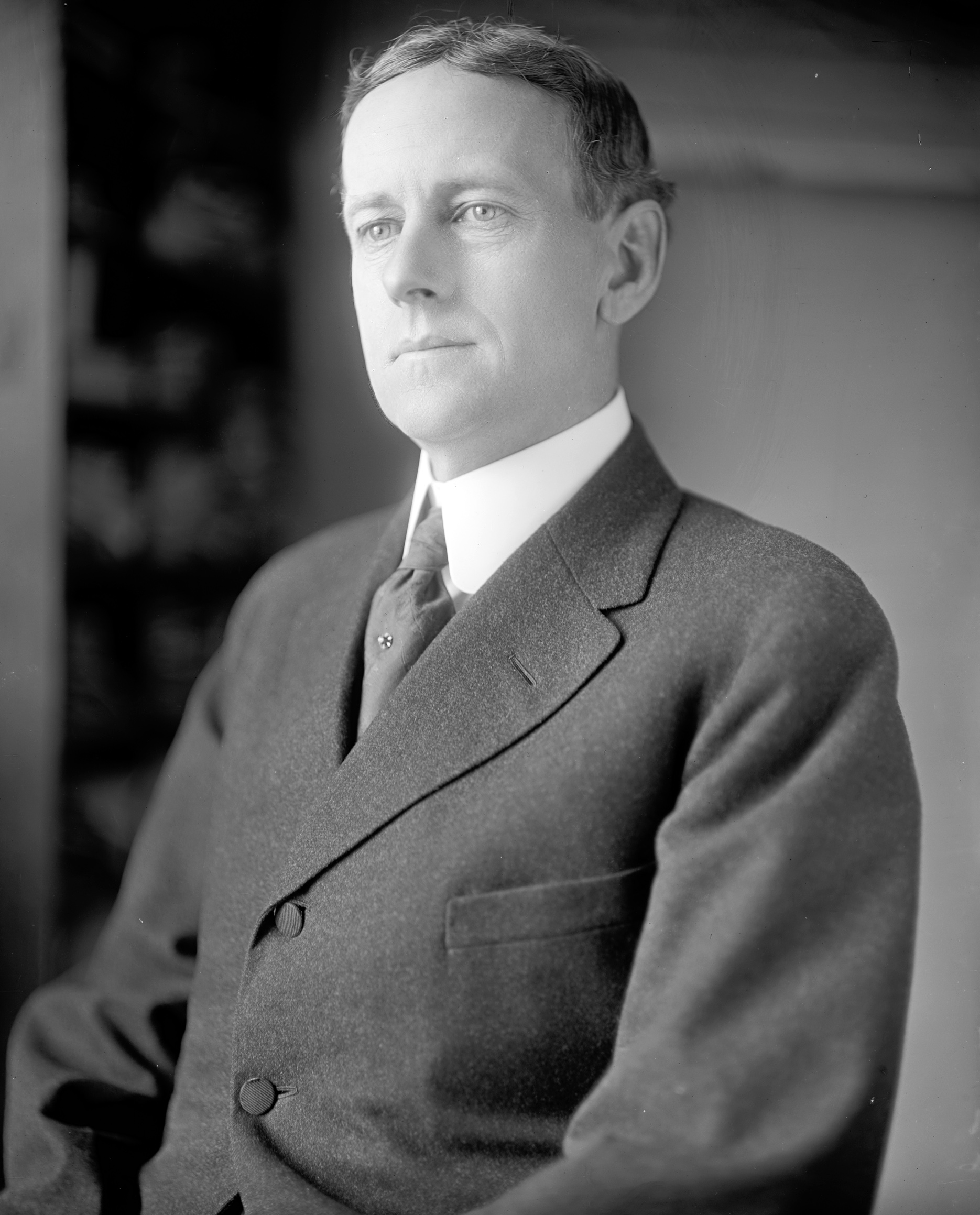

Member of the U.S. House of Representatives from Iowa's 10th district
- In office March 4, 1909 – March 3, 1919
- Preceded by: James P. Conner
- Succeeded by: Lester J. Dickinson

Personal details
- Born: December 11, 1868 Sharon, Wisconsin, United States
- Died: April 25, 1944 (aged 75) Altadena, California, United States
- Resting place: Mountain View Cemetery
- Party: Republican

Frank Plowman Woods (December 11, 1868 – April 25, 1944) was a five-term Republican U.S. Representative from Iowa's 10th congressional district, in north-central Iowa. He reached a House leadership position after only two terms. However, in 1917 his vote against the United States' declaration of war on the German Empire effectively ended his political career, leading to his loss of the Republican nomination for re-election to his seat, and of his leadership position for the remainder of his final term.

Born near Sharon, Wisconsin, Woods attended the public schools and the Northern Indiana Normal School, Valparaiso, Indiana. He moved to Estherville, Iowa, in 1887 and worked in a newspaper office for two years. He engaged in the real estate, loan and insurance business until about 1902 when he helped organize the Iowa Savings Bank of Estherville. He also became involved in the publication of the Northern Vindicator newspaper of Estherville, before and after its merger with the Emmet County Republican. He managed Iowa Governor Albert B. Cummins' successful campaign for a third term in 1906, and served as chairman of the Republican State Central Committee in 1906 and 1907.

In 1908, Woods defeated incumbent Congressman James Perry Conner in the Republican primary for Iowa's 10th congressional district, and then won the general election. His district, known as the "big tenth," was made up of Boone, Calhoun, Carroll, Emmet, Greene, Hamilton, Humboldt, Hancock, Kossuth, Palo Alto, Pocahontas, Winnebago, and Webster counties. He sided with the progressive wing of his party, against the more conservative "stand-patters." As a Republican his seat was relatively secure; in its fifty-year existence the 10th district never elected a Democrat.

In 1913, after his second re-election, he was elected chairman of the National Republican Congressional Committee. However, his congressional career took a hard turn in April 1917, when he was one of only 56 members of Congress to vote against the resolution declaring war against Germany. Several weeks later, Woods also voted against the Espionage Act of 1917.

The other Iowa congressman to vote against war, Harry E. Hull, survived the resulting furor and won re-election, but Woods did not. Facing many challengers from his own party in the wartime 1918 Republican primary election, he was defeated by Algona lawyer (and future U.S. Senator) L. J. Dickinson. In the immediate aftermath of his loss in the primary, fellow National Republican Campaign Committee members demanded that he also resign his leadership position. Those efforts faded when Woods announced he would resign following the summer recess, but when he changed his mind, he was forced out of the chairmanship. In all, Woods served in the House from March 4, 1909 to March 3, 1919.

After Congress, Woods returned to Estherville. In 1921, he moved to the Pasadena, California area, where his parents had moved several years earlier. He lived in California until his death in Altadena, California on April 25, 1944. He was interred in Mountain View Cemetery.

U.S. House of Representatives
| Preceded by James P. Conner | Member of the U.S. House of Representatives from Iowa's 10th congressional district 1909–1919 | Succeeded by Lester J. Dickinson |
