= Waterloo Ridge Lutheran Church =

- Waterloo Ridge Menigheds Kirke og Kirkegard Historic District
- U.S. National Register of Historic Places
- U.S. Historic district
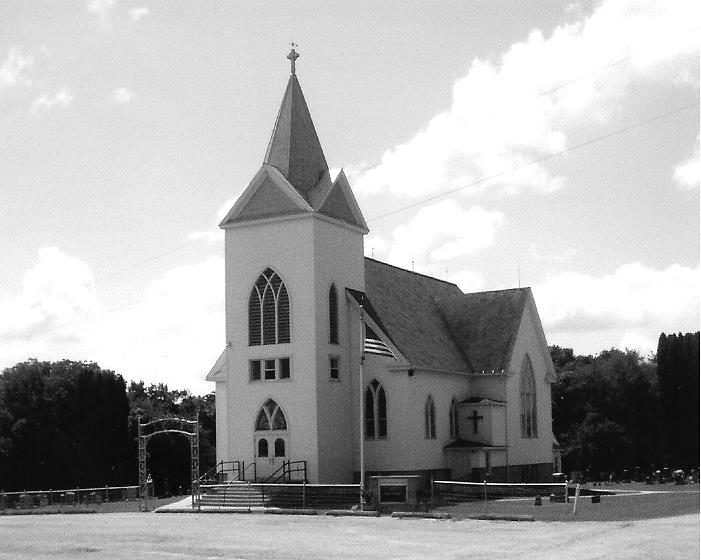

- Location within Iowa Location within the United States
- Location: 169 Dorchester Dr.
- Nearest city: Dorchester, Iowa
- Coordinates: 43°29′07.7″N 91°36′01.4″W
- Area: 2.3 acres (0.93 ha)
- Built: 1912
- Architectural style: Gothic Revival
- NRHP reference No.: 15000435
- Added to NRHP: July 21, 2015

Waterloo Ridge Lutheran Church is located northwest of the unincorporated community of Dorchester, Iowa, United States. It and the churchyard form a nationally recognized historic district that was listed on the National Register of Historic Places in 2015. At the time of its nomination, it consisted of three resources, which included one contributing building, one contributing site, and one contributing structure.

== History ==
The first Norwegian families who settled in this area arrived in 1855. Their spiritual needs were taken care of by itinerant Lutheran clergy. The first church meetings were held in 1860 and Rev. Nils O. Brandt, the first Lutheran clergyman in Iowa, preached the first sermon. The Waterloo Ridge Congregation was established from the Norwegian Ridge Congregation and the Big Canoe Congregation in 1867. The Rev. Hans Andreas Stub accepted the call to be the first pastor in 1868. The Norwegian Evangelical Lutheran Church incorporated the congregation on March 25, 1869. The first trustees were Hans Johnson Gaare, John Svenson, and Peter Martinson; with Anders Larson and Ole Clauson acting as incorporators as well.

The congregation's first church building was a locally quarried stone structure built in 1867. The first cemetery used by the congregation was the West Waterloo Ridge Cemetery, also known as the Miner Farm Cemetery. While it was owned by the congregation, it was located on the farm of its caretaker. The cemetery in the churchyard was laid out in 1871 and the first burial was recorded in 1873. The stone church was replaced by the present church building in 1912, and it was dedicated the following year. It was erected for around $15,000. A grey steel woven wire fence and iron gate built over the walkway into the church were added just after the church building was completed. The script on the archway reads in Norwegian: Kom til Guds Hus (Come to Gods House). The Waterloo Ridge Cemetery is located in the churchyard.

== Historic district ==
The church building is the contributing building. It is a frame, cruciform, Gothic Revival structure. The congregation designed it after the brick structures of the Norwegian Ridge Congregation and the Big Canoe Congregation's church of 1902. Norwegian Ridge's original brick church (1877) was destroyed in a fire and it was replaced in 1893. Lancet windows with Gothic tracery and stained glass line the side walls of the Waterloo Ridge church. A central entrance tower dominates the main facade. The spire is capped with a Celtic cross and weather vane. The interior features a gallery in the back, semi-circular pews flanked by aisles, and an ornately carved wooden altar, pulpit, and communion rail in the chancel.

The grey steel woven wire fence and archway, the contributing structure, are located along the north side of the property. The cemetery in the churchyard is the contributing site.
