= Cottage Hill Methodist–Episcopal Cemetery =

- Cottage Hill Methodist-Episcopal Cemetery
- U.S. National Register of Historic Places
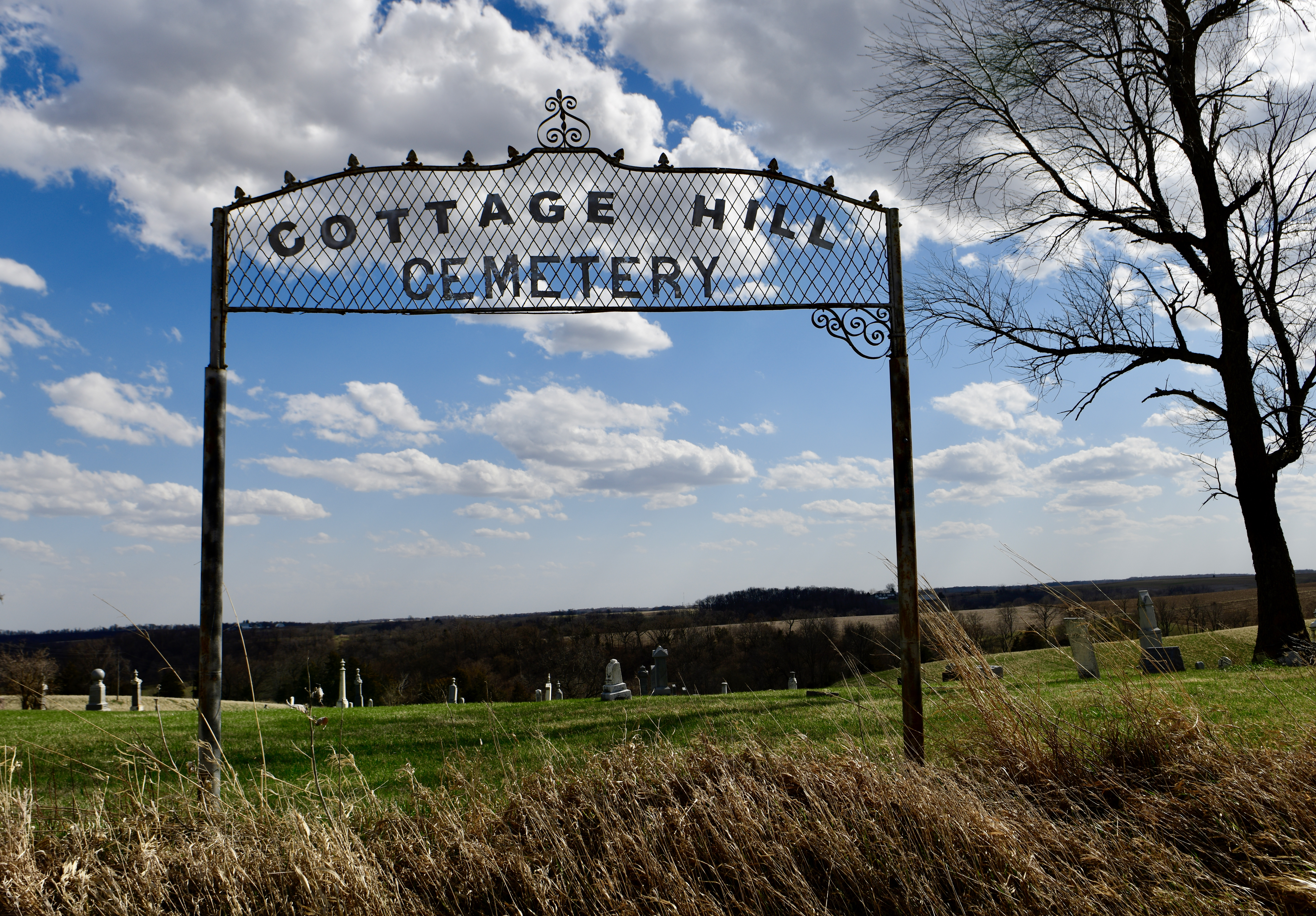

- Location within Iowa Location within the United States
- Location: 22001 N. U.S. Route 52
- Nearest city: Durango, Iowa
- Coordinates: 42°35′02″N 90°55′04″W
- Area: 2.69 acres (1.09 ha)
- NRHP reference No.: 75000686
- Added to NRHP: June 19, 2017

The Cottage Hill Methodist–Episcopal Cemetery is a historic site located in Concord Township, near the small city of Durango in Dubuque County, Iowa, United States. The cemetery was established in 1843 when the first burial took place. It is significant as a representation of the pioneer settlement era and the development of the village of Cottage Hill, no longer extant, and the surrounding area. Its period of significance continues until 1909 when the last settler was buried here. The last burial here was in 1991.

The cemetery lies to the south of an old stagecoach route known as the Territorial Road, now U.S. Route 52. It contains about 144 marked burials and 43 that are unmarked. The site is enclosed by a combination of chain-link fence on the north and post-and-wire fence on the other three sides. There is no landscaping within the cemetery proper. The graves are laid out in rows. The grave markers vary in designs and for the most part, are moderate in size. There are some larger monuments for individuals and families, as well as some smaller markers. They are carved from white or grey marble and granite. A white, frame Methodist Episcopal church building was located on the northeast corner of the cemetery in 1856, and it served its congregation into the 1940s. It has subsequently been removed. The cemetery was listed on the National Register of Historic Places in 2017.

== See also ==
- Concord Congregational Cemetery, also located in what was the town of Cottage Hill
