= Prairie Center Methodist Episcopal Church and Pleasant Hill Cemetery =

Historic site in Dallas County, Iowa, US

- U.S. National Register of Historic Places
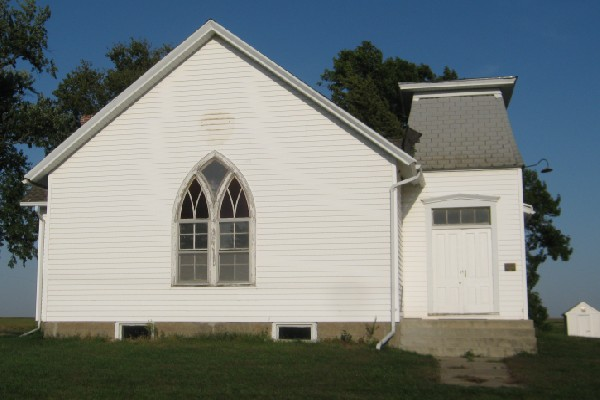

- Location within Iowa Location within the United States
- Location: Beaumont Ave. and 200th St.
- Nearest city: Yale, Iowa
- Coordinates: 41°44′45″N 94°15′2″W
- Area: 7 acres (2.8 ha)
- Built: 1880
- NRHP reference No.: 04001141
- Added to NRHP: October 12, 2004

Prairie Center Methodist Episcopal Church and Pleasant Hill Cemetery is a historic church and cemetery in rural Lincoln Township, southeast of Yale, Iowa, United States. The Methodist Episcopal Church established a congregation in 1866, and services were held in area schoolhouses until a frame building was constructed for a church in 1880. It was dedicated in January 1881. A cemetery was located across the road. Some of the graves predate the church and were moved from other cemeteries. As the congregation expanded the building was remodeled and a tower with a new entrance on the southeast corner, and an alcove on the north side were added. The orientation of the interior was changed so that the congregation, who had faced east, now faced north. A basement was dug below the sanctuary in 1925 for space for Sunday School classes. The church and cemetery were added to the National Register of Historic Places in 2004. Services continue to be held in the church once a month.
