= Benjamin Chapel and Richwoods Cemetery =

Historic site in Henry County, Iowa, US

- U.S. National Register of Historic Places
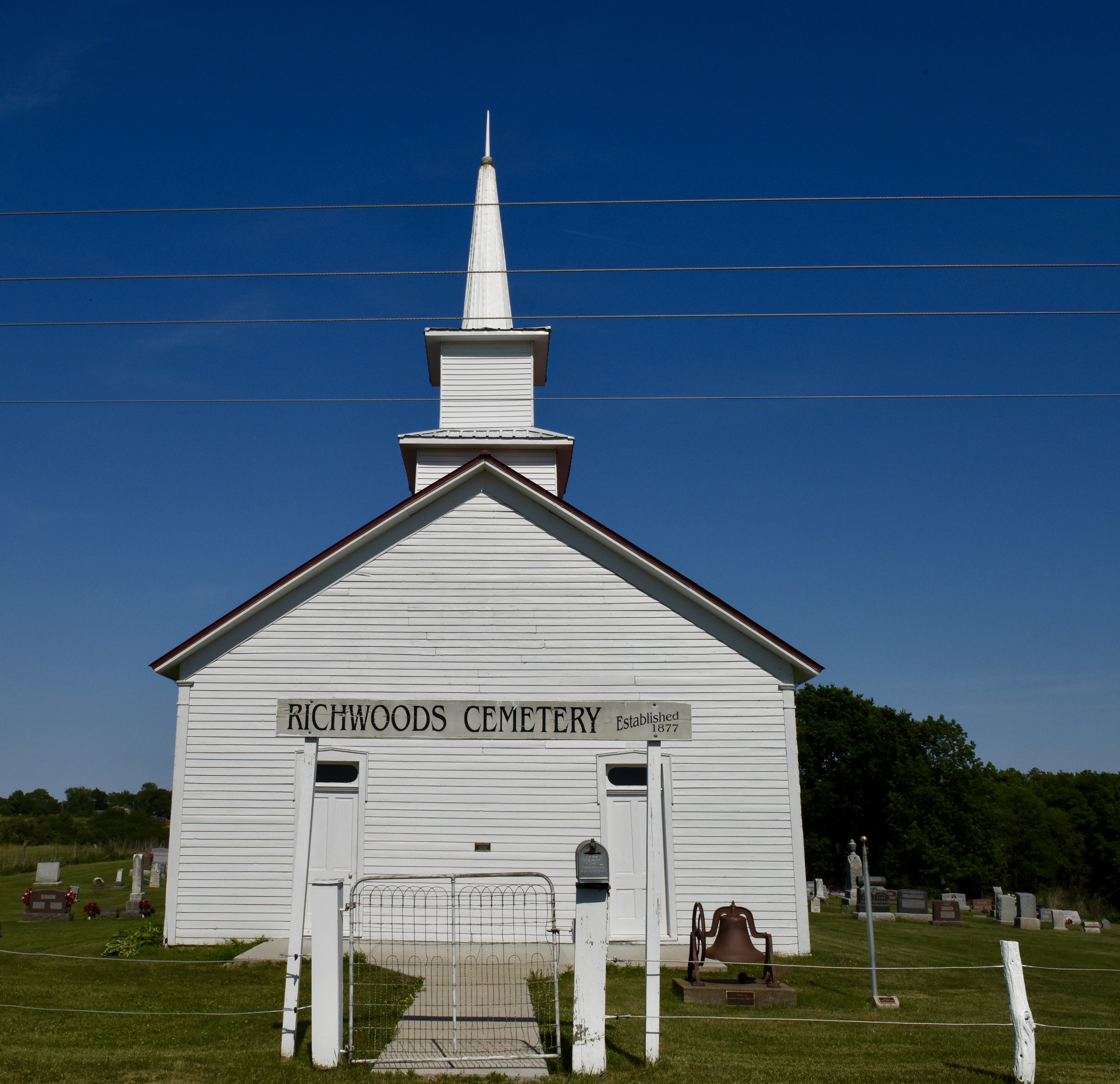

- Location within Iowa Location within the United States
- Location: 1936 Franklin Ave.
- Nearest city: Trenton, Iowa
- Coordinates: 41°01′37.2″N 91°36′41.5″W
- Area: approximately 2 acres (0.81 ha)
- Built: 1877
- NRHP reference No.: 15000746
- Added to NRHP: October 23, 2015

Benjamin Chapel and Richwoods Cemetery, also known as Richwoods Methodist Protestant Church or simply Richwoods Church, is a historic church located south of the unincorporated community of Trenton in rural Henry County, Iowa, United States. This front gable, frame church building was built by a congregation of the Methodist Protestant Church in 1877. The congregation itself was formed sometime after 1843. The building has two entrances on the main facade, one for men and the other for women. The genders then sat separately on their respective sides of the church building. The interior still has the original pews with dividers. There is also a small tower, capped with a spire, above the facade. The Methodist Protestant Church continued to maintain the building until 1921 when they sold it to the Benjamin Chapel Association. The association was named for Benjamin B. Allender, who was instrumental in building the church. Regular church services and Sunday school classes were held until 1940, and occasionally until 1952. The cemetery behind the church was a burial ground for the Methodist congregation as well as other residents from the Richwoods area. It is still an active burial ground. The church and cemetery were added to the National Register of Historic Places in 2015.
