= 1930 United States Senate election in Iowa =

- November 4, 1930
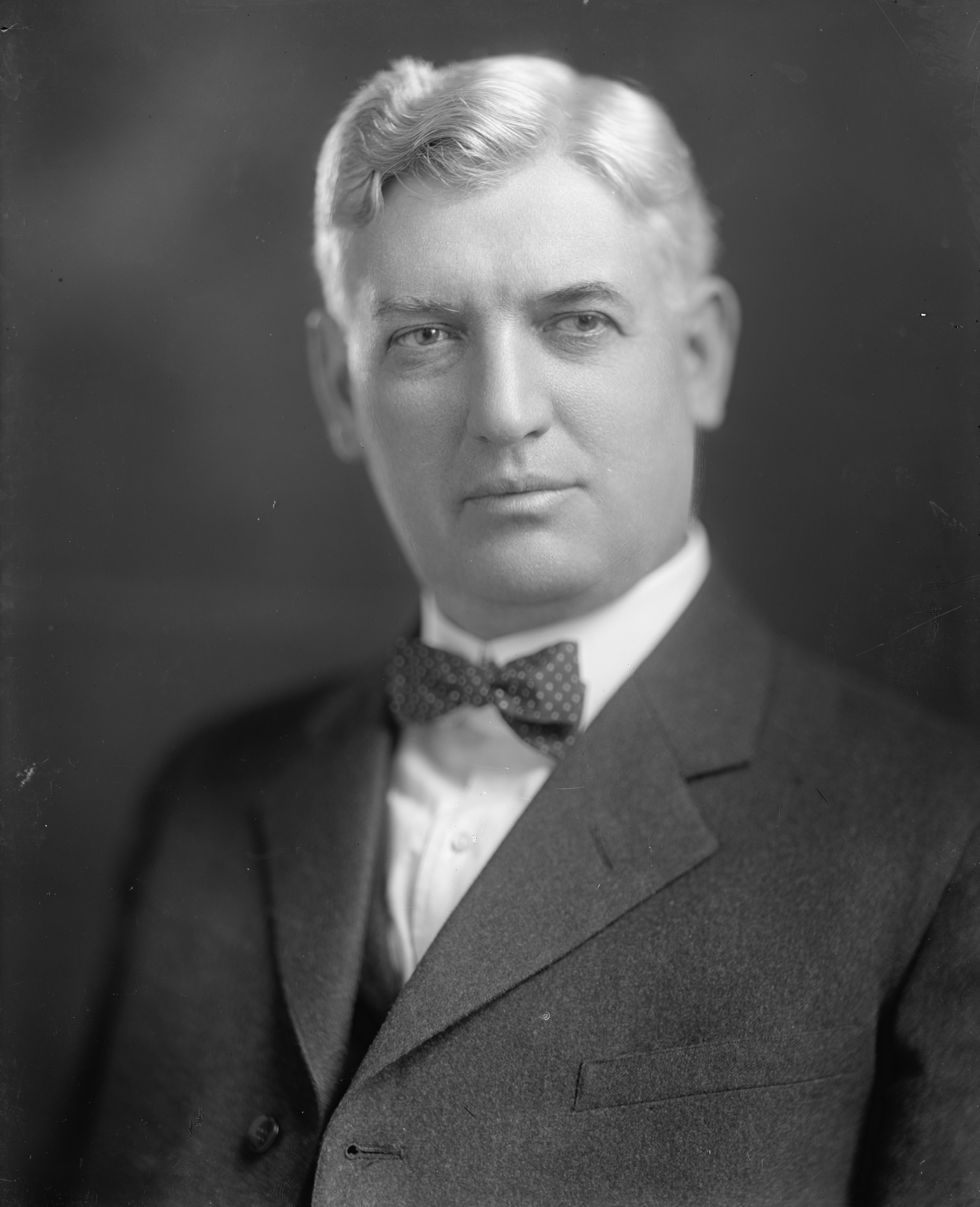

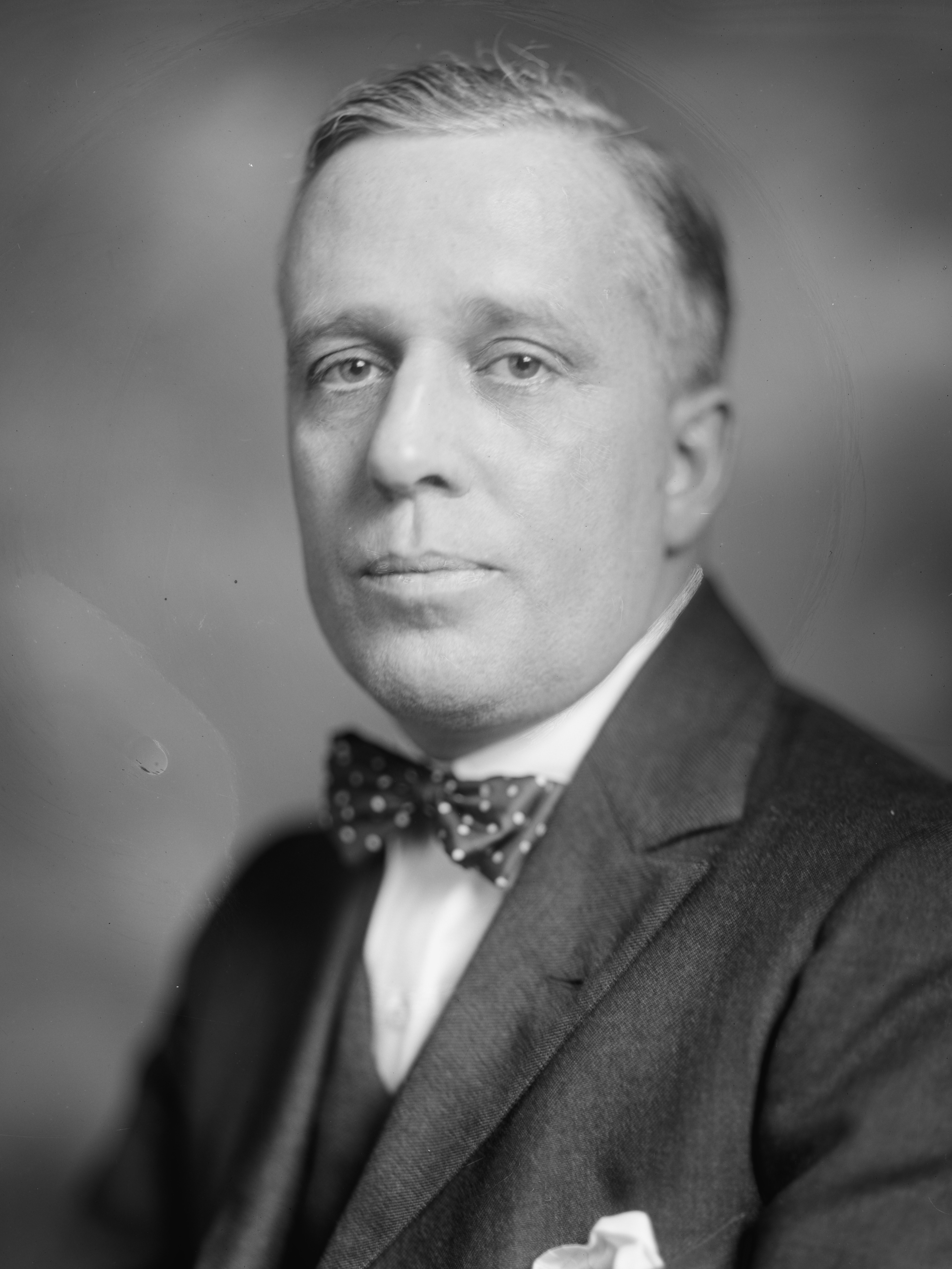
Nominee	L. J. Dickinson	Daniel F. Steck
Party	Republican	Democratic
Popular vote	307,613	235,186
Percentage	56.29%	43.03%
- County results Dickinson: 50–60% 60–70% 70–80% Steck: 50–60% 60–70%
U.S. senator before election
Daniel F. Steck
Democratic
Elected U.S. Senator
Lester J. Dickinson
Republican

The 1930 United States Senate election in Iowa took place on November 4, 1930. Incumbent Democratic Senator Daniel F. Steck ran for re-election to a full term in office, but was defeated by U.S. Representative Lester J. Dickinson.

This was the only Senate seat Republicans gained in the 1930 elections.

== General election ==
=== Candidates ===
- Lester J. Dickinson, U.S. Representative from Algona (Republican)
- L.E. Eickelberg, candidate for Senate in 1924 (Independent)
- Daniel F. Steck, incumbent Senator since 1926 (Democratic)
- Arthur A. Wells (Farmer-Labor)

=== Results ===
1930 U.S. Senate election in Iowa
Party	Candidate	Votes	%	±%
Republican	Lester J. Dickinson	307,613	56.29%	▲6.34
Democratic	Daniel F. Steck (incumbent)	235,186	43.03%	▼6.84
Farmer–Labor	Arthur A. Wells	2,668	0.49%	N/A
Independent	L.E. Eickelberg	1,405	0.19%	▲0.13
Total votes		546,512	100.00%	

== See also ==
- 1930 United States Senate elections
