= Merwin Coad =

American politician (1924–2025)

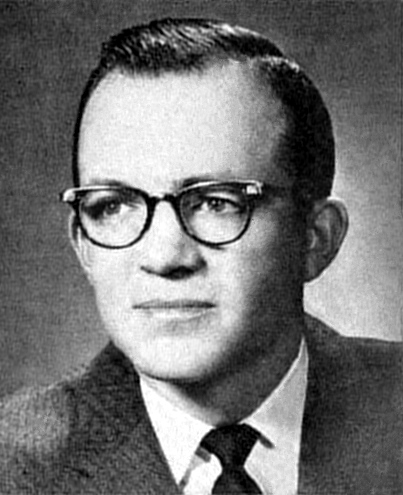

Member of the U.S. House of Representatives from Iowa's 6th district
- In office January 3, 1957 – January 3, 1963
- Preceded by: James I. Dolliver
- Succeeded by: Neal Smith (redistricted)

Personal details
- Born: Doyle Merwin Coad; September 28, 1924 Mitchell County, Kansas, U.S.
- Died: September 5, 2025 (aged 100) Rowlett, Texas, U.S.
- Party: Democratic
- Spouse(s): Delores Hale (m. 1944; div. 1961) Carol Faye Farnsworth (m. 1961, divorced) Georgette Hill (m. 1991; div. 1998)
- Children: 6
- Education: Peru State College; Phillips University; Texas Christian University (BA); Drake University

Doyle Merwin Coad (September 28, 1924 – September 5, 2025) was an American minister and politician from Iowa who served as a member of the United States House of Representatives from 1957 to 1963. His election snapped the Republican Party's fourteen-year hold on every U.S. House seat from Iowa. He was a member of the Democratic Party.

== Background ==
Doyle Merwin Coad was born on a farm in Mitchell County, Kansas, near Cawker City, Kansas. He moved with his parents to a farm in Nemaha County, Nebraska, near Auburn, Nebraska. He graduated from high school in Auburn in 1941. He attended Peru State Teachers College in Peru, Nebraska in 1941 and 1942, and Phillips University in Enid, Oklahoma from 1942 to 1944, and then graduated from Texas Christian University at Fort Worth, Texas in 1945. He also studied at Drake University in Des Moines, Iowa.

Coad was ordained to the ministry of Disciples of Christ Church, in Boone, Iowa, in 1945. He served as associate minister in St. Joseph, Missouri, in 1948 and 1949, as a Minister at Lenox, Iowa from 1949 to 1951, and as a Minister in Boone, from 1951 to 1956.

== Election and re-election to Congress ==
In 1956, Coad ran as a Democrat against six-term incumbent Republican Congressman James I. Dolliver. Coad's initial margin of victory was 83 votes out of over 129,000 votes cast, prompting a recount (which reaffirmed his victory with a margin of 198 votes). Dolliver then tried and failed to convince the U.S. House to overturn the election. Coad was re-elected twice.

== Withdrawal from politics ==
The 1960 census caused Iowa to lose a seat in Congress, and the 1961 Iowa Legislature's resulting reapportionment placed parts of the old 6th congressional district into several districts. Coad's home county (Boone) was included in the 5th congressional district, which had been represented since 1959 by popular fellow Democrat Neal Smith.

There were reports that Coad was considering a 1962 bid for either the Senate or the Iowa governorship. However, on June 8, 1961, Coad, then only 36, announced that he was withdrawing from politics, effective at the end of his current term (in 1962). Coad gave no reasons. However, it was soon front-page news that the former minister had obtained an Alabama divorce from his Iowa wife in March 1961, allegedly without first notifying her, and that in May 1961, Coad had married Carol Peters, a member of his staff who had just obtained a Nevada divorce from Coad's executive assistant. She then received a raise, making her his highest-paid staffer. Meanwhile, stories of Coad's financial problems, including gambling debts, and losses from his grain market investments, were published in The Des Moines Register and Time magazine.

In 1962, Coad voted to pass the Communications Satellite Act of 1962.

Before his term ended in 1962, Coad considered moving to Carroll County, Iowa and running for the seat in Iowa's 7th congressional district then held by thirteen-term Representative Ben F. Jensen. In the end, however, he stayed out of the 1962 race. Coad's congressional service, which began on January 3, 1957, ended on January 3, 1963.

== Later life and death ==
In July 1963 Coad began working in the Kennedy Administration as a $75-per-day consultant for the Agency for International Development's office of material resources. However, when Iowa Senator Bourke B. Hickenlooper — serving as the ranking Republican on the United States Senate Committee on Foreign Relations — learned of this, he contacted the head of the agency and raised an objection, based on what he described as Coad's "background and history and utter lack of qualifications for the job." Coad resigned the next day, and flew to Iowa to blast his critics.

Coad then became involved in real estate lending in the Washington D.C. area, but by the late 1960s he faced at least one civil suit, and later a grand jury investigation. In one civil suit U.S. District Court Judge John Sirica enjoined Coad from foreclosing on the plaintiff's home, reportedly stating, "This is a racket . . . That's all it is, just a racket."

By the early 1980s, Coad was speaking at free seminars, marketed in newspaper advertisements with the headline, "You Can Buy Real Estate with $10 Down and Become Wealthy in your Spare Time." One such ad stated that Coad was "America's most effective and dynamic instructor on real estate and is the foremost consultant on no money down purchasing techniques."

By the 1990s, Coad resided in Washington, D.C. and Harpers Ferry, West Virginia. He married Georgette Hill of Teterboro, New Jersey, on September 19, 1991. They divorced in Florida in April 1998.

Coad turned 100 on September 28, 2024, becoming one of the small handful of former U.S. Representatives to have done so. He died in Rowlett, Texas on September 5, 2025, at the age of 100. He was the last living former U.S. representative who assumed office in the 1950s, and the last living former U.S. representative who served during the Presidency of Dwight D. Eisenhower.

U.S. House of Representatives
Preceded by James I. Dolliver	Member of the U.S. House of Representatives from Iowa's 6th congressional district 1957–1963	Succeeded by Charles B. Hoeven
Honorary titles
Preceded by John Dingell	Most Senior Living U.S. Representative; Sitting or Former; 2019–2025; Served alongside: William Broomfield (2019), Hal Haskell (2019–2020)	Succeeded by Don Fuqua; Alec G. Olson
