= Forest Cemetery Entrance =

United States historic place in Oskaloosa, Iowa

- U.S. National Register of Historic Places
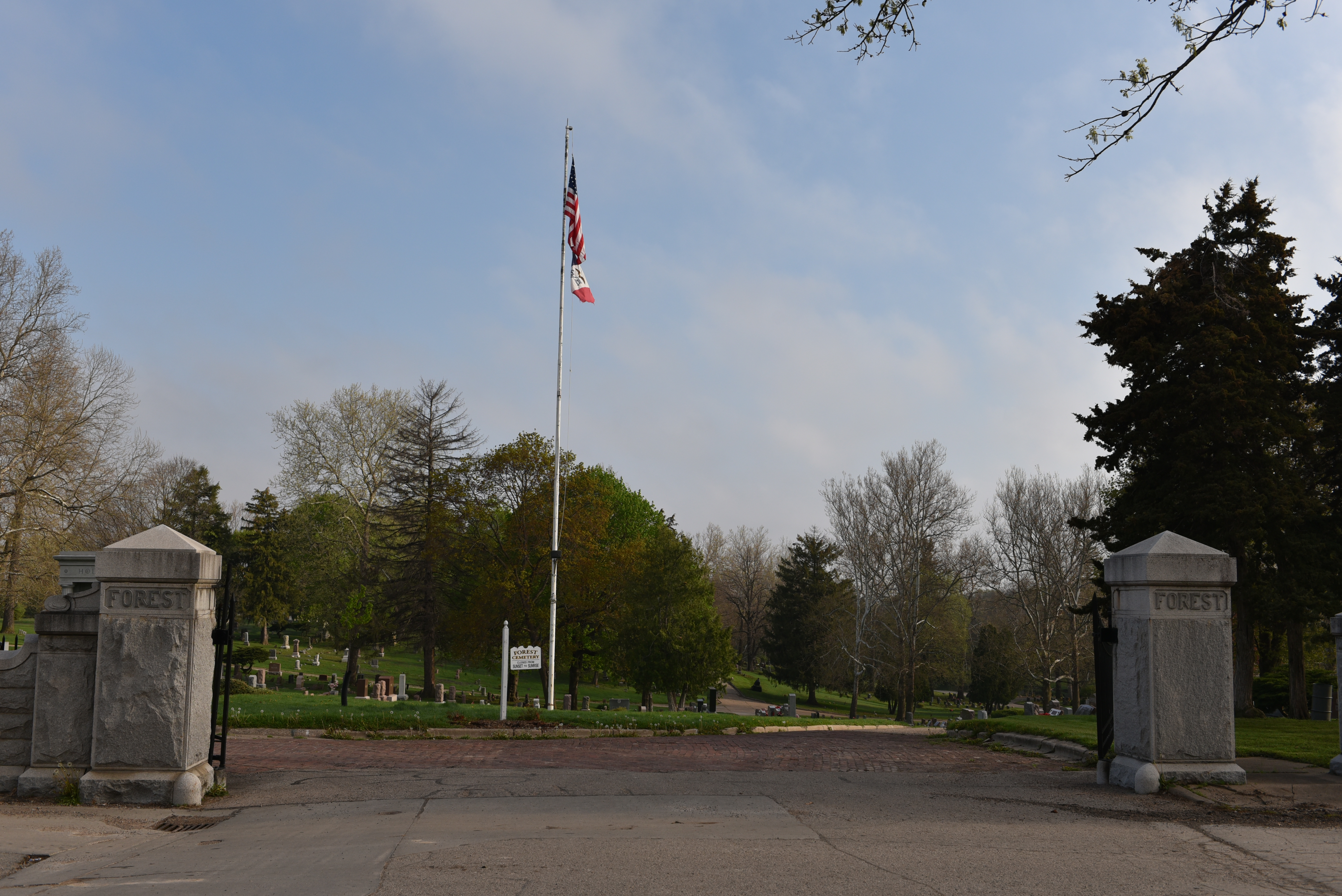

- Location within Iowa Location within the United States
- Location: Jct. of N. 9th St. and J Ave. E., Oskaloosa, Mahaska County, Iowa
- Coordinates: 41°18′12″N 92°38′2″W
- Area: less than one acre
- Built: 1915
- Architect: Frank E. Wetherell
- MPS: Oskaloosa MPSThe Quaker Testimony in Oskaloosa, Iowa MPS
- NRHP reference No.: 91001765
- Added to NRHP: December 13, 1991

The Forest Cemetery Entrance is a historic structure located in Oskaloosa, Iowa, United States. It was designed by Frank E. Wetherell and built in 1915. While he was known for his buildings, he was also involved with civic improvement projects in Des Moines that included the beautification of the banks along the Des Moines River. This included a series of walls and walkways, and planning new thoroughfares to ease traffic congestion. The two pillars are composed of rusticated grey Barre Granite. They have the name of the cemetery, "Forest," carved on them. Walls extend from the pillars and include openings for sidewalks. They end at iron fences. It was listed on the National Register of Historic Places in 1991.

== See also ==
- List of cemeteries in Iowa
