= St. John's Lutheran Church (Hampton, Iowa) =

- St. John's Danish Evangelical Lutheran Church Historic District
- U.S. National Register of Historic Places
- U.S. Historic district
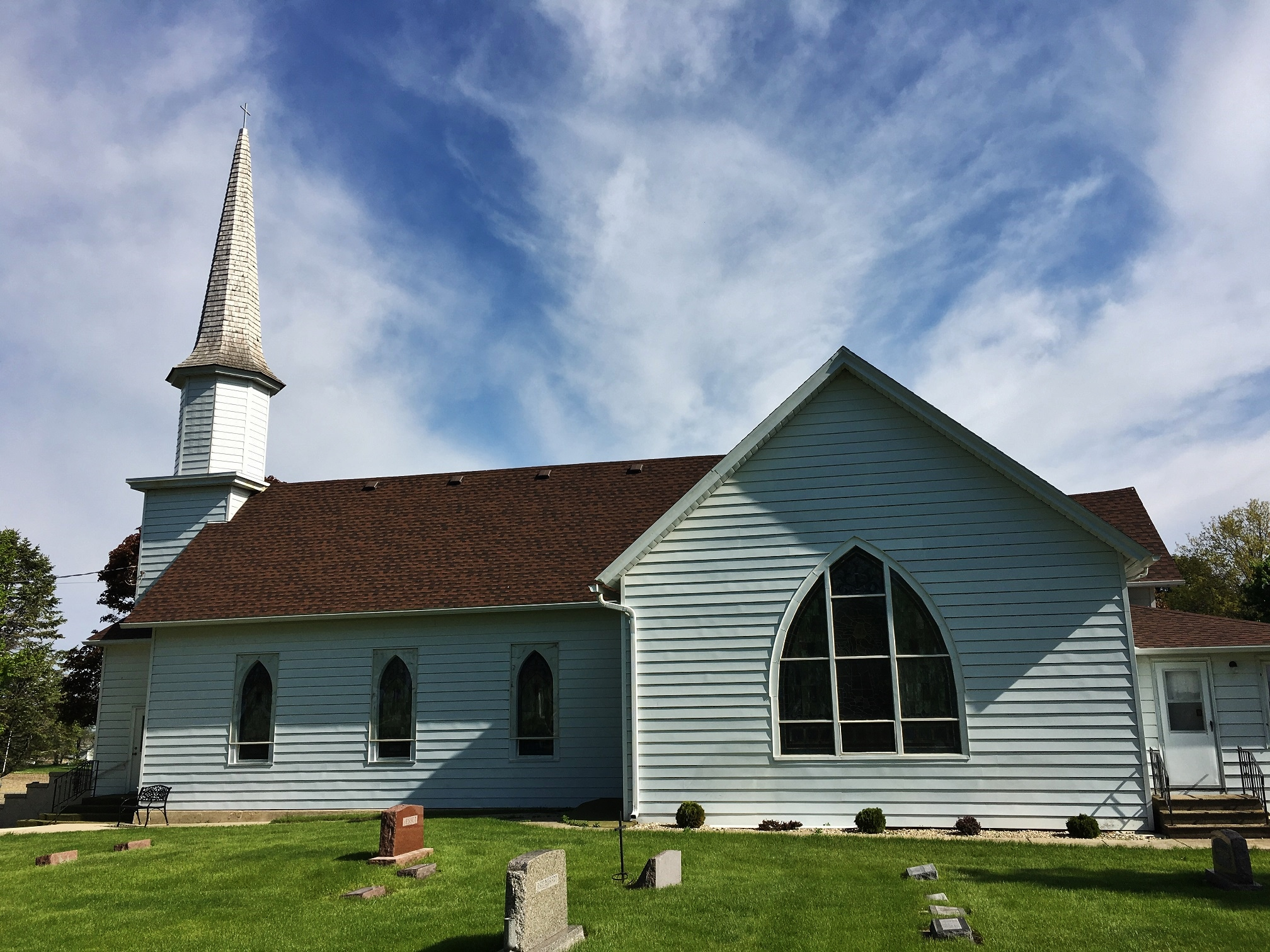

- Location within Iowa Location within the United States
- Location: 1207 Indigo Ave. Hampton, Iowa
- Coordinates: 42°43′10″N 93°20′24″W
- Area: 15 acres (6.1 ha)
- Built by: Jens Larsen Jensen
- Architectural style: Late 19th and 20th Century Revivals
- NRHP reference No.: 15000726
- Added to NRHP: October 13, 2015

St. John's Lutheran Church is located in rural Franklin County, Iowa, United States, west of the city of Hampton. The church property was listed as a historic district on the National Register of Historic Places as St. John's Danish Evangelical Lutheran Church in 2015. At the time of its nomination it contained ten resources, which included five contributing buildings, two contributing sites, one contributing structure, one contributing object, and one non-contributing structure.

Founded in June 1879, St. John's was one of the few all-Danish congregations in Iowa. They bought 40 acres (16 ha) of land in July 1883, and completed a parsonage the same year. The front portion of the present frame church was dedicated on March 25, 1889, and it was enlarged ten years later to its present T-plan. A hall to house the Danish language school was completed in 1896, and it was replaced by the present structure in 1917. The present parsonage was built in 1950. The other contributing buildings include the parsonage garage, and the garage for the custodian's house (the house is no longer extant). The ornamental entrance gate and metal fence are the structure. The object is a stepping stone utilized by those who arrived by carriage. The sites include the remaining 15 acres (6.1 ha) of land and the cemetery. The congregation had to sell off most of its land to pay off debts during difficult financial times. The cemetery, which surrounds the church, is significant because it is believed it initially followed a European burial tradition. Plots were not sold until the early 1940s with perpetual care plots, but early photographs of the property show the existence of graves whose markers are no longer extant. Early burials used light coffins and successive burials were superimposed over the older.
