= Hugh and Matilda Boyle House and Cemetery Historic District =

Historic site in Henry County, Iowa, US

- U.S. National Register of Historic Places
- U.S. Historic district
- Location within Iowa Location within the United States
- Location: 3225 Lexington Ave. Lowell, Iowa
- Coordinates: 40°50′19.4″N 91°30′15.9″W
- Area: 2.5 acres (1.0 ha)
- NRHP reference No.: 15000747
- Added to NRHP: October 23, 2015

The Hugh and Matilda Boyle House and Cemetery Historic District, also known as Boyleston Cemetery, is a nationally recognized historic district located west of Lowell, Iowa, United States. It was listed on the National Register of Historic Places in 2015. At the time of its nomination it consisted of three resources, which included one contributing building, one contributing site, and one non-contributing building.

Hugh Boyle established a mill along the Skunk River in the mid- to late-1840s, and he built this vernacular stone house (c. 1850) to the south for his family's residence. Even though there were significant stone resources along the river, this is one of the few stone houses in this part of the county. Boyle died in 1854 and is buried in the small cemetery to the west of the house. Three of his children were previously buried there. The mill continued to operate and the area became known as Boyleston. A post office was established in the lower level of the house in 1868 and it operated there until 1871. There is also an indication that a store was also located on the lower level of the house. Boyleston continued to flourish until the mill was destroyed by ice and flooding in the late 1880s when it was owned and operated by Adam Tempel. Tempel's daughter and son-in-law, Edward and Elizabeth Chaney, bought the property and operated a farm here from 1889 to 1950. The last marked burial in the cemetery was that of Adam Tempel in 1893.
