= Pleasant Grove Community Church and Cemetery =

Historic site in Ames, Story County, Iowa, US

- U.S. National Register of Historic Places
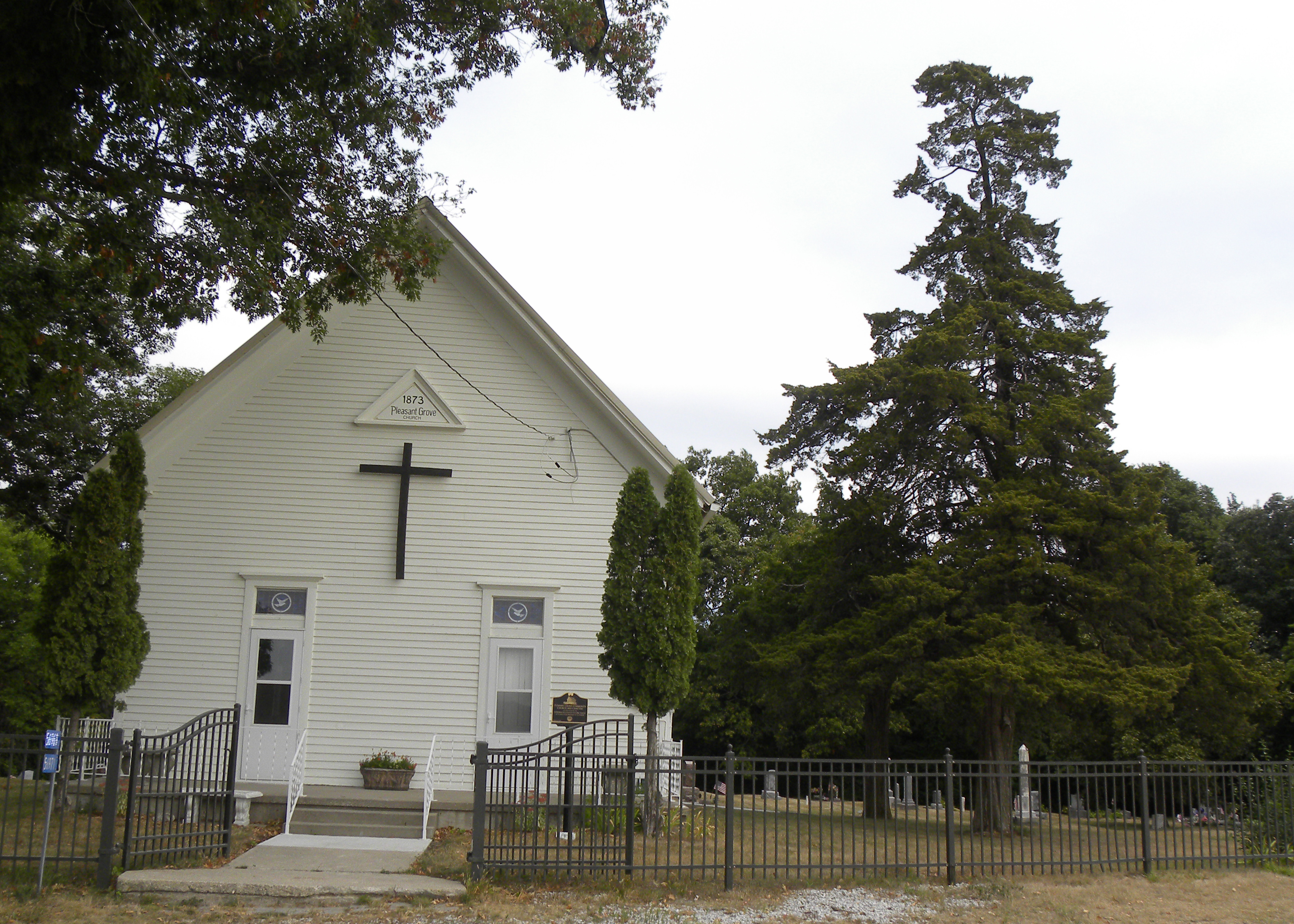

- Location within Iowa Location within the United States
- Location: 56971 170th St; Ames, Iowa
- Coordinates: 42°6′30″N 93°33′42″W
- Area: less than one acre
- Built: 1874
- Architectural style: Mid 19th Century Revival, Front Gable
- NRHP reference No.: 10000295
- Added to NRHP: May 28, 2010

Pleasant Grove Community Church and Cemetery (also known as Methodist Episcopal Church of Milford Township) is a historic church building at 56971 170th Street in Ames, Iowa, United States. The church was founded in 1873. There does not appear to be any record of when construction was finished, but the church held a celebration of its centennial on September 16, 1973.

The land for the cemetery was purchased in 1877. Some of the gravestones in the cemetery predate the creation of the cemetery, most of whom are also recorded as being buried in the McMichael Cemetery.

Pleasant Grove Community Church closed from 1917 to 1925 due to the Spanish Flu pandemic and World War one. The church also closed from 1933 to 1939, after which renovations were performed to help restore the aging church. According to the Nevada Evening Journal, much of the work was completed in one day on September 27, 1940, when over 56 people were purported to have worked together on fixing the building. The basement was added in 1940 and electricity in 1941. The church was closed again from some year during the 1950s until it was reopened in 1960.

The building was completed in 1874 and was added to the National Register of Historic Places in 2010.
