= Cedar Memorial =

Cemetery in Linn County, Iowa, US

- Interactive map of Cedar Memorial

Details
- Established: 1929
- Location: Cedar Rapids, Iowa
- Country: United States of America
- Coordinates: 42°01′22″N 91°38′03″W
- Type: Public
- Owned by: (Original) Carl K. Linge (Present) Carl John Linge
- Size: 72 acres (29 ha)
- No. of graves: >35,000
- Website: Official website
- Find a Grave: Cedar Memorial

Cedar Memorial (also known as Cedar Memorial Park Cemetery) is a cemetery and funeral home located in Cedar Rapids, Iowa.

== Location ==
The park is on 1st Avenue between Cedar Rapids and Marion and includes a wooded cemetery, a natural limestone funeral home, a modern cremation center, a full-service reception facility, a full-service flower shop, and a chapel and mausoleum patterned after old world churches of England.

The park is 82 acres (330,000 m^{2}) in size, and offers traditional burial, lawn crypts, indoor mausoleum entombment and cremation gardens. There are also several columbariums in the cemetery with niches for burial of cremated remains.

== History ==
C. John Linge is the President of the Cedar Memorial Park Cemetery. He is the third generation of Linges to oversee the cemetery. The cemetery was founded by his grandfather Carl K. Linge. In 1929, Carl K. Linge bought a farm between Cedar Rapids and Marion and began planning the cemetery. Carl K. Linge died in 1963 and his son, David E. Linge (the second generation) became president. David E. Linge had been working with his father for a number of years. David founded The Cedar Memorial Funeral Home Company in 1965 creating the first combination operation in the state of Iowa with a funeral home on the cemetery grounds. David also oversaw the addition of over 4500 lawn crypts in the cemetery. David died in 1988 and his son, Carl John Linge became president of the cemetery association. James B. Klinger served as president of the funeral home company until 2004 at which time C. John Linge assumed the responsibilities of president of the funeral home company. He oversaw the addition of the Cedar Cremation Center, the Family Center and Library, the Corridor of Hope in the Chapel of Memories Mausoleum, Iowa Cremation and Companions for Life.

Notable burials at Cedar include Bourke B. Hickenlooper (1896–1971), Iowa Governor and US Senator, and Earl Whitehill (1899–1954), MLB pitcher.
