= 1850 Iowa's 1st congressional district special election =

- September 24, 1850
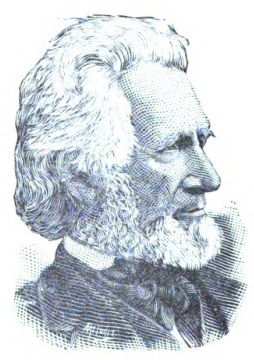

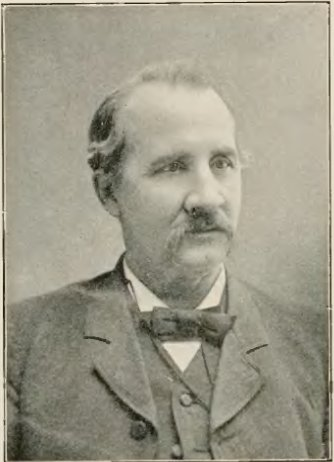
Nominee	Daniel F. Miller	William Thompson
Party	Whig	Democratic
Popular vote	5,463	4,801
Percentage	51.40%	45.17%
Representative before election
None
Elected Representative
Daniel F. Miller
Whig

A special election to the United States House of Representatives for Iowa's 1st congressional district was held September 24, 1850.

The winning candidate would serve briefly in the United States House of Representatives to represent Iowa in the 31st Congress until the general election on October 8, 1850.

== Background ==
In 1848, the Whig Party nominated Miller to run against incumbent Democratic Congressman William Thompson. Thompson was declared the winner by the state's election canvassers, but Miller accused Thompson of absconding with the voting rolls from the election. The U.S. House resolved the contest over two years after it occurred, by deciding that neither Thompson nor Miller was entitled to the seat.

== Candidates ==
=== Democratic ===
==== Nominee ====
- William Thompson, former U.S. Representative from Iowa's 1st congressional district (1847–1850)

=== Whig ===
==== Nominee ====
- Daniel F. Miller, lawyer and former member of Iowa's territorial house of representatives (1840)

=== Independent ===
==== Nominee ====
- Delazon Smith, anti-abolitionist activist who later went onto become a U.S. Senator from Oregon

== General election ==
1850 Iowa's 1st congressional district special election
Party	Candidate	Votes	%	±%
Whig	Daniel F. Miller	5,463	51.40%	+4.10%
Democratic	William Thompson	4,801	45.17%	−5.13%
Independent	Delazon Smith	365	3.43%	+3.43%
Majority		662	6.23%	+3.23%
Turnout		10,629	100.00%	
Whig gain from Democratic				

== See also ==
- United States House of Representatives elections, 1844
- United States House of Representatives elections, 1846
