= Iowa's 1st congressional district =

U.S. House district for Iowa

Coordinates: 42°31′40″N 91°53′46″W

- Interactive map of district boundaries since January 3, 2023
- Representative: Mariannette Miller-Meeks; R–Davenport
- Distribution: 66.35% urban; 33.65% rural
- Population (2025): 802,344
- Median household income: $75,690
- Ethnicity: 83.4% White; 5.6% Hispanic; 4.5% Black; 3.8% Two or more races; 2.2% Asian; 0.5% other
- Cook PVI: R+4

Iowa's 1st congressional district is a congressional district in the U.S. state of Iowa that covers its southeastern part, bordering the states of Illinois and Missouri, and the Mississippi River. The district includes the cities of Davenport, Iowa City, Burlington, and Indianola. Republican Mariannette Miller-Meeks is the current U.S. representative.

== Composition ==
The 1st includes the entirety of the following counties:

#	County	Seat	Population
31	Cedar	Tipton	18,302
45	Clinton	Clinton	46,158
57	Des Moines	Burlington	38,253
87	Henry	Mount Pleasant	19,547
95	Iowa	Marengo	16,381
97	Jackson	Maquoketa	19,342
99	Jasper	Newton	37,919
101	Jefferson	Fairfield	15,440
103	Johnson	Iowa City	157,528
105	Jones	Anamosa	20,900
107	Keokuk	Sigourney	9,914
111	Lee	Fort Madison, Keokuk	32,565
115	Louisa	Wapello	10,513
123	Mahaska	Oskaloosa	21,874
125	Marion	Knoxville	33,770
139	Muscatine	Muscatine	42,218
163	Scott	Davenport	174,270
177	Van Buren	Keosauqua	7,266
181	Warren	Indianola	55,205
183	Washington	Washington	22,560

== Recent election results from statewide races ==
Year	Office	Results
2008	President	Obama 57–41%
2012	President	Obama 57–43%
2016	President	Trump 48–45%
2016	Senate	Grassley 56–39%
2018	Governor	Hubbell 51–47%
2018	Secretary of State	Pate 49–48%
2018	Auditor	Sand 54–43%
2018	Treasurer	Fitzgerald 56–41%
2020	President	Trump 50–48%
2020	Senate	Ernst 49–48%
2022	Senate	Grassley 53–47%
2022	Governor	Reynolds 55–43%
2022	Secretary of State	Pate 57–43%
2022	Auditor	Sand 52–48%
2022	Treasurer	Smith 50.4–49.6%
2022	Attorney General	Miller 51–49%
2024	President	Trump 53–45%
2026	Senate	Turek 52–44%
2026	Governor	Sand 58–42%

== List of members representing the district ==
Representative	Party	Term	Cong ress	Election history	Location
District created March 4, 1847
William Thompson (Mount Pleasant)	Democratic	March 4, 1847 – June 29, 1850	30th 31st	Elected in 1846. Re-elected in 1848. Seat declared vacant due to an election challenge.	1847–1849 [data missing]
William Thompson (Mount Pleasant)	Democratic	March 4, 1847 – June 29, 1850	30th 31st	Elected in 1846. Re-elected in 1848. Seat declared vacant due to an election challenge.	1849–1859 [data missing]
Vacant		June 29, 1850 – December 20, 1850	31st		1849–1859 [data missing]
Daniel F. Miller (Fort Madison)	Whig	December 20, 1850 – March 3, 1851	31st	Elected to finish Thompson's term. Retired.	1849–1859 [data missing]
Bernhart Henn (Fairfield)	Democratic	March 4, 1851 – March 3, 1855	32nd 33rd	Elected in 1850. Re-elected in 1852. Retired to run for U.S. senator.	1849–1859 [data missing]
Augustus Hall (Keosauqua)	Democratic	March 4, 1855 – March 3, 1857	34th	Elected in 1854. Lost re-election.	1849–1859 [data missing]
Samuel Curtis (Keokuk)	Republican	March 4, 1857 – August 4, 1861	35th 36th 37th	Elected in 1856. Re-elected in 1858. Re-elected in 1860. Resigned to serve as a colonel in the 2nd Iowa Volunteer Infantry Regiment.	1849–1859 [data missing]
Samuel Curtis (Keokuk)	Republican	March 4, 1857 – August 4, 1861	35th 36th 37th	Elected in 1856. Re-elected in 1858. Re-elected in 1860. Resigned to serve as a colonel in the 2nd Iowa Volunteer Infantry Regiment.	1859–1863 [data missing]
Vacant		August 4, 1861 – October 8, 1861	37th		1859–1863 [data missing]
James F. Wilson (Fairfield)	Republican	October 8, 1861 – March 3, 1869	37th 38th 39th 40th	Elected to finish Curtis's term. Re-elected in 1862. Re-elected in 1864. Re-elected in 1866. Retired.	1859–1863 [data missing]
James F. Wilson (Fairfield)	Republican	October 8, 1861 – March 3, 1869	37th 38th 39th 40th	Elected to finish Curtis's term. Re-elected in 1862. Re-elected in 1864. Re-elected in 1866. Retired.	1863–1873 [data missing]
George W. McCrary (Keokuk)	Republican	March 4, 1869 – March 3, 1877	41st 42nd 43rd 44th	Elected in 1868. Re-elected in 1870. Re-elected in 1872. Re-elected in 1874. Retired.	1863–1873 [data missing]
George W. McCrary (Keokuk)	Republican	March 4, 1869 – March 3, 1877	41st 42nd 43rd 44th	Elected in 1868. Re-elected in 1870. Re-elected in 1872. Re-elected in 1874. Retired.	1873–1933; Des Moines, Henry, Jefferson, Lee, Louisa, Van Buren, and Washington counties
Joseph C. Stone (Burlington)	Republican	March 4, 1877 – March 3, 1879	45th	Elected in 1876. Lost renomination.	1873–1933; Des Moines, Henry, Jefferson, Lee, Louisa, Van Buren, and Washington counties
Moses A. McCoid (Fairfield)	Republican	March 4, 1879 – March 3, 1885	46th 47th 48th	Elected in 1878. Re-elected in 1880. Re-elected in 1882. Lost renomination.	1873–1933; Des Moines, Henry, Jefferson, Lee, Louisa, Van Buren, and Washington counties
Benton J. Hall (Burlington)	Democratic	March 4, 1885 – March 3, 1887	49th	Elected in 1884. Lost re-election.	1873–1933; Des Moines, Henry, Jefferson, Lee, Louisa, Van Buren, and Washington counties
John H. Gear (Burlington)	Republican	March 4, 1887 – March 3, 1891	50th 51st	Elected in 1886. Re-elected in 1888. Lost re-election.	1873–1933; Des Moines, Henry, Jefferson, Lee, Louisa, Van Buren, and Washington counties
John J. Seerley (Burlington)	Democratic	March 4, 1891 – March 3, 1893	52nd	Elected in 1890. Lost re-election.	1873–1933; Des Moines, Henry, Jefferson, Lee, Louisa, Van Buren, and Washington counties
John H. Gear (Burlington)	Republican	March 4, 1893 – March 3, 1895	53rd	Elected in 1892. Retired to run for U.S. Senator.	1873–1933; Des Moines, Henry, Jefferson, Lee, Louisa, Van Buren, and Washington counties
Samuel M. Clark (Keokuk)	Republican	March 4, 1895 – March 3, 1899	54th 55th	Elected in 1894. Re-elected in 1896. Retired.	1873–1933; Des Moines, Henry, Jefferson, Lee, Louisa, Van Buren, and Washington counties
Thomas Hedge (Burlington)	Republican	March 4, 1899 – March 3, 1907	56th 57th 58th 59th	Elected in 1898. Re-elected in 1900. Re-elected in 1902. Re-elected in 1904. Retired.	1873–1933; Des Moines, Henry, Jefferson, Lee, Louisa, Van Buren, and Washington counties
Charles A. Kennedy (Montrose)	Republican	March 4, 1907 – March 3, 1921	60th 61st 62nd 63rd 64th 65th 66th	Elected in 1906. Re-elected in 1908. Re-elected in 1910. Re-elected in 1912. Re-elected in 1914. Re-elected in 1916. Re-elected in 1918. Retired.	1873–1933; Des Moines, Henry, Jefferson, Lee, Louisa, Van Buren, and Washington counties
William F. Kopp (Mount Pleasant)	Republican	March 4, 1921 – March 3, 1933	67th 68th 69th 70th 71st 72nd	Elected in 1920. Re-elected in 1922. Re-elected in 1924. Re-elected in 1926. Re-elected in 1928. Re-elected in 1930. Lost re-election.	1873–1933; Des Moines, Henry, Jefferson, Lee, Louisa, Van Buren, and Washington counties
Edward C. Eicher (Washington)	Democratic	March 4, 1933 – December 2, 1938	73rd 74th 75th	Re-elected in 1932. Re-elected in 1934. Re-elected in 1936. Resigned to become commissioner of the Securities and Exchange Commission.	1933–1943 [data missing]
Vacant		December 2, 1938 – January 3, 1939	75th		1933–1943 [data missing]
Thomas E. Martin (Iowa City)	Republican	January 3, 1939 – January 3, 1955	76th 77th 78th 79th 80th 81st 82nd 83rd	Elected in 1938. Re-elected in 1940. Re-elected in 1942. Re-elected in 1944. Re-elected in 1946. Re-elected in 1948. Re-elected in 1950. Re-elected in 1952. Retired to run for U.S. Senator.	1933–1943 [data missing]
Thomas E. Martin (Iowa City)	Republican	January 3, 1939 – January 3, 1955	76th 77th 78th 79th 80th 81st 82nd 83rd	Elected in 1938. Re-elected in 1940. Re-elected in 1942. Re-elected in 1944. Re-elected in 1946. Re-elected in 1948. Re-elected in 1950. Re-elected in 1952. Retired to run for U.S. Senator.	1943–1963 [data missing]
Fred Schwengel (Davenport)	Republican	January 3, 1955 – January 3, 1965	84th 85th 86th 87th 88th	Elected in 1954. Re-elected in 1956. Re-elected in 1958. Re-elected in 1960. Re-elected in 1962. Lost re-election.	1943–1963 [data missing]
Fred Schwengel (Davenport)	Republican	January 3, 1955 – January 3, 1965	84th 85th 86th 87th 88th	Elected in 1954. Re-elected in 1956. Re-elected in 1958. Re-elected in 1960. Re-elected in 1962. Lost re-election.	1963–1973 [data missing]
John R. Schmidhauser (Iowa City)	Democratic	January 3, 1965 – January 3, 1967	89th	Elected in 1964. Lost re-election.	1963–1973 [data missing]
Fred Schwengel (Davenport)	Republican	January 3, 1967 – January 3, 1973	90th 91st 92nd	Elected in 1966. Re-elected in 1968. Re-elected in 1970. Lost re-election.	1963–1973 [data missing]
Edward Mezvinsky (Iowa City)	Democratic	January 3, 1973 – January 3, 1977	93rd 94th	Elected in 1972. Re-elected in 1974. Lost re-election.	1973–1983 [data missing]
Jim Leach (Davenport)	Republican	January 3, 1977 – January 3, 2003	95th 96th 97th 98th 99th 100th 101st 102nd 103rd 104th 105th 106th 107th	Elected in 1976. Re-elected in 1978. Re-elected in 1980. Re-elected in 1982. Re-elected in 1984. Re-elected in 1986. Re-elected in 1988. Re-elected in 1990. Re-elected in 1992. Re-elected in 1994. Re-elected in 1996. Re-elected in 1998. Re-elected in 2000. Redistricted to the 2nd district.	1973–1983 [data missing]
Jim Leach (Davenport)	Republican	January 3, 1977 – January 3, 2003	95th 96th 97th 98th 99th 100th 101st 102nd 103rd 104th 105th 106th 107th	Elected in 1976. Re-elected in 1978. Re-elected in 1980. Re-elected in 1982. Re-elected in 1984. Re-elected in 1986. Re-elected in 1988. Re-elected in 1990. Re-elected in 1992. Re-elected in 1994. Re-elected in 1996. Re-elected in 1998. Re-elected in 2000. Redistricted to the 2nd district.	1983–1993 [data missing]
Jim Leach (Davenport)	Republican	January 3, 1977 – January 3, 2003	95th 96th 97th 98th 99th 100th 101st 102nd 103rd 104th 105th 106th 107th	Elected in 1976. Re-elected in 1978. Re-elected in 1980. Re-elected in 1982. Re-elected in 1984. Re-elected in 1986. Re-elected in 1988. Re-elected in 1990. Re-elected in 1992. Re-elected in 1994. Re-elected in 1996. Re-elected in 1998. Re-elected in 2000. Redistricted to the 2nd district.	1993–2003 [data missing]
Jim Nussle (Manchester)	Republican	January 3, 2003 – January 3, 2007	108th 109th	Redistricted from the 2nd district and re-elected in 2002. Re-elected in 2004. Retired to run for Governor.	2003–2013
Bruce Braley (Waterloo)	Democratic	January 3, 2007 – January 3, 2015	110th 111th 112th 113th	Elected in 2006. Re-elected in 2008. Re-elected in 2010. Re-elected in 2012. Retired to run for U.S. senator.	2003–2013
Bruce Braley (Waterloo)	Democratic	January 3, 2007 – January 3, 2015	110th 111th 112th 113th	Elected in 2006. Re-elected in 2008. Re-elected in 2010. Re-elected in 2012. Retired to run for U.S. senator.	2013–2023
Rod Blum (Dubuque)	Republican	January 3, 2015 – January 3, 2019	114th 115th	Elected in 2014. Re-elected in 2016. Lost re-election.	2013–2023
Abby Finkenauer (Dubuque)	Democratic	January 3, 2019 – January 3, 2021	116th	Elected in 2018. Lost re-election.	2013–2023
Ashley Hinson (Marion)	Republican	January 3, 2021 – January 3, 2023	117th	Elected in 2020. Redistricted to the 2nd district.	2013–2023
Mariannette Miller-Meeks (Ottumwa)	Republican	January 3, 2023 – present	118th 119th	Redistricted from the 2nd district and re-elected in 2022. Re-elected in 2024. Lost re-election.	2023–present: most of Iowa's southeastern quadrant
Christina Bohannan (Iowa City)	Democratic	Assuming office on January 3, 2027		Elected in 2026.	2023–present: most of Iowa's southeastern quadrant

== Recent election results ==
Year	Winner			Loser			Percentage of votes
Year	Party	Candidate	Votes	Party	Candidate	Votes	Percentage of votes
1920	Republican	William F. Kopp	38,100	Democratic	E. W. McManus	20,977	64–36%
1922	Republican	William F. Kopp	26,651	Democratic	John M. Lindley	14,056	65–34%
1924	Republican	William F. Kopp	42,711	Democratic	James M. Bell	17,110	71–29%
1926	Republican	William F. Kopp	27,358	Democratic	James M. Bell	11,408	71–29%
1928	Republican	William F. Kopp	45,806	unopposed			100–0%
1930	Republican	William F. Kopp	27,053	Democratic	Max A. Conrad	15,538	63–36%
1932	Democratic	Edward C. Eicher	55,378	Republican	William F. Kopp	46,738	54–46%
1934	Democratic	Edward C. Eicher	48,544	Republican	E. R. Hicklin	39,047	55–44%
1936	Democratic	Edward C. Eicher	55,721	Republican	John N. Calhoun	53,474	51–49%
1938	Republican	Thomas E. Martin	46,636	Democratic	James P. Gaffney	33,765	58–42%
1940	Republican	Thomas E. Martin	70,120	Democratic	Zoe S. Nabers	46,040	60–40%
1942	Republican	Thomas E. Martin	55,139	Democratic	Vern W. Nall	32,893	61–37%
1944	Republican	Thomas E. Martin	72,729	Democratic	Clair A. Williams	60,048	55–45%
1946	Republican	Thomas E. Martin	52,488	Democratic	Clair A. Williams	32,849	62–38%
1948	Republican	Thomas E. Martin	70,959	Democratic	James D. France	60,860	53–46%
1950	Republican	Thomas E. Martin	70,058	Democratic	James D. France	43,140	62–38%
1952	Republican	Thomas E. Martin	105,526	Democratic	Clair A. Williams	62,011	63–37%
1954	Republican	Fred Schwengel	67,128	Democratic	John O'Connor	50,577	57–43%
1956	Republican	Fred Schwengel	94,223	Democratic	Ronald O. Bramhall	68,287	58–42%
1958	Republican	Fred Schwengel	59,577	Democratic	Thomas J. Dailey	51,996	53–47%
1960	Republican	Fred Schwengel	104,737	Democratic	Walter J. Guenther	67,287	61–39%
1962	Republican	Fred Schwengel	65,975	Democratic	Harold Stephens	42,000	61–39%
1964	Democratic	John R. Schmidhauser	84,042	Republican	Fred Schwengel	80,697	51–49%
1966	Republican	Fred Schwengel	64,795	Democratic	John R. Schmidhauser	60,534	51–48%
1968	Republican	Fred Schwengel	91,419	Democratic	John R. Schmidhauser	81,049	53–47%
1970	Republican	Fred Schwengel	60,270	Democratic	Edward Mezvinsky	59,505	50–49%
1972	Democratic	Edward Mezvinsky	107,099	Republican	Fred Schwengel	91,609	53–46%
1974	Democratic	Edward Mezvinsky	75,687	Republican	Jim Leach	63,540	54–46%
1976	Republican	Jim Leach	109,694	Democratic	Edward Mezvinsky	101,024	52–48%
1978	Republican	Jim Leach	79,940	Democratic	Richard E. Meyers	45,037	63–36%
1980	Republican	Jim Leach	133,349	Democratic	Jim Larew	72,602	64–35%
1982	Republican	Jim Leach	89,595	Democratic	Bill Gluba	61,734	59–41%
1984	Republican	Jim Leach	131,182	Democratic	Kevin Ready	65,293	68–33%
1986	Republican	Jim Leach	86,834	Democratic	John Whitaker	43,985	66–34%
1988	Republican	Jim Leach	112,746	Democratic	Bill Gluba	71,280	61–38%
1990	Republican	Jim Leach	90,042	scattering		151	99–1%
1992	Republican	Jim Leach	178,042	Democratic	Jan J. Zonneveld	81,600	68–31%
1994	Republican	Jim Leach	110,448	Democratic	Glen Winekauf	69,461	60–38%
1996	Republican	Jim Leach	129,242	Democratic	Bob Rush	111,595	53–46%
1998	Republican	Jim Leach	106,419	Democratic	Bob Rush	79,529	57–42%
2000	Republican	Jim Leach	164,972	Democratic	Bob Simpson	96,283	62–36%
2002	Republican	Jim Nussle	112,280	Democratic	Ann Hutchinson	83,779	57–43%
2004	Republican	Jim Nussle	159,993	Democratic	Bill Gluba	125,490	55–44%
2006	Democratic	Bruce Braley	113,724	Republican	Mike Whalen	89,471	56–44%
2008	Democratic	Bruce Braley	178,229	Republican	David Hartsuch	99,447	64–35%
2010	Democratic	Bruce Braley	103,931	Republican	Ben Lange	99,976	49–48%
2012	Democratic	Bruce Braley	222,422	Republican	Ben Lange	162,465	57–42%
2014	Republican	Rod Blum	147,513	Democratic	Pat Murphy	140,086	51–49%
2016	Republican	Rod Blum	206,903	Democratic	Monica Vernon	177,403	53–46%
2018	Democratic	Abby Finkenauer	169,348	Republican	Rod Blum	152,540	50–46%
2020	Republican	Ashley Hinson	211,679	Democratic	Abby Finkenauer	200,893	51–48%
2022	Republican	Mariannette Miller-Meeks	162,947	Democratic	Christina Bohannan	142,173	53–46%

=== 2002 ===
2002 Iowa's 1st congressional district election
Party	Candidate	Votes	%
Republican	Jim Nussle	112,280	57.15
Democratic	Ann Hutchinson	83,779	42.65
No party	Others	396	0.20
Total votes		196,455	100.00
Turnout			
Republican hold			

=== 2004 ===
2004 Iowa's 1st congressional district election
Party	Candidate	Votes	%
Republican	Jim Nussle*	159,993	55.16
Democratic	Bill Gluba	125,490	43.26
Libertarian	Mark Nelson	2,727	0.94
Independent	Denny Heath	1,756	0.61
No party	Others	88	0.03
Total votes		290,054	100.00
Turnout			
Republican hold			

=== 2006 ===
2006 Iowa's 1st congressional district election
Party	Candidate	Votes	%
Democratic	Bruce Braley	114,322	55.06
Republican	Mike Whalen	89,729	43.22
Independent	James Hill	2,201	1.06
Libertarian	Albert W. Schoeman	1,226	0.59
No party	Others	143	0.07
Total votes		207,621	100.00
Turnout			
Democratic gain from Republican			

- Note: James Hill ran on the Pirate Party platform on the ballot.

=== 2008 ===
2008 Iowa's 1st congressional district election
Party	Candidate	Votes	%
Democratic	Bruce Braley*	186,991	64.56
Republican	David Hartsuch	102,439	35.37
No party	Others	199	0.07
Total votes		289,629	100.00
Turnout			
Democratic hold			

=== 2010 ===
2010 Iowa's 1st congressional district election
Party	Candidate	Votes	%
Democratic	Bruce Braley*	104,428	49.52
Republican	Ben Lange	100,219	47.52
Libertarian	Rob Petsche	4,087	1.94
Independent	Jason A. Faulkner	2,092	0.99
No party	Others	76	0.04
Total votes		210,902	100.00
Turnout			
Democratic hold			

=== 2012 ===
2012 Iowa's 1st congressional district election
Party	Candidate	Votes	%
Democratic	Bruce Braley*	222,422	54.90
Republican	Ben Lange	162,465	40.10
Independent	Gregory Hughes	4,772	1.18
Independent	George Todd Krail II	931	0.23
No party	Others	259	0.06
Total votes		405,110	100.00
Turnout			
Democratic hold			

=== 2014 ===
2014 Iowa's 1st congressional district election
Party	Candidate	Votes	%
Republican	Rod Blum	145,383	51.18
Democratic	Pat Murphy	138,335	48.70
No party	Others	348	0.12
Total votes		284,066	100.00
Republican gain from Democratic			

=== 2016 ===
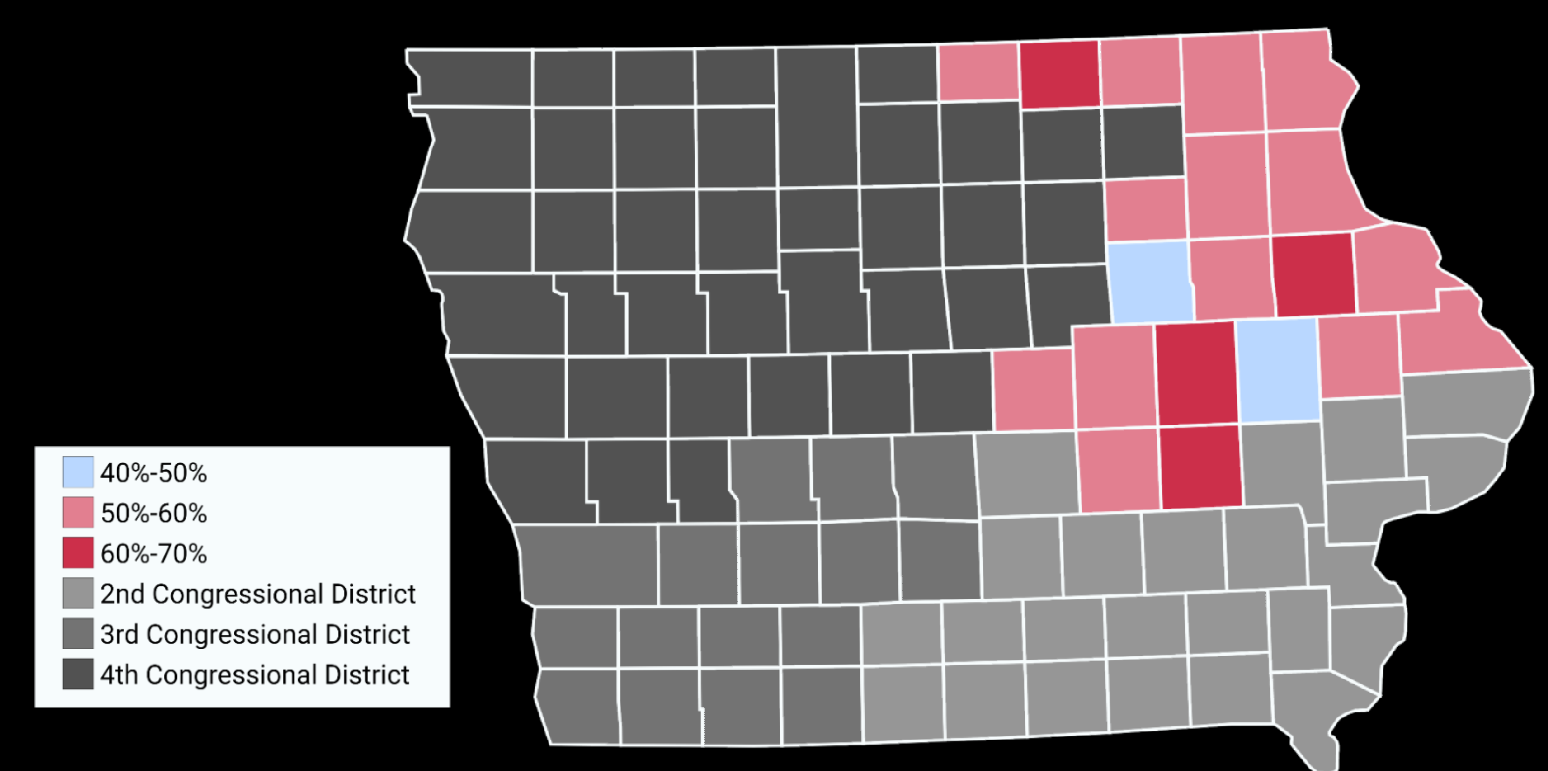
Map showing the results of the 2016 election in Iowa's 1st congressional district by county

2016 Iowa's 1st congressional district election
Party	Candidate	Votes	%
Republican	Rod Blum (incumbent)	206,903	53.7
Democratic	Monica Vernon	177,403	46.1
No party	Others	671	0.2
Total votes		384,977	100.00
Republican hold			

=== 2018 ===
Results of the 2018 Iowa's 1st congressional district election

2018 Iowa's 1st congressional district election
Party	Candidate	Votes	%	±%
Democratic	Abby Finkenauer	169,496	50.9	+4.8
Republican	Rod Blum (incumbent)	153,077	45.6	−7.7
Libertarian	Troy Hageman	10,239	3.1	+3.1
Write-ins		171	0.05	−0.15
Majority		16,419	5.3	
Turnout		332,983	100	
Democratic gain from Republican		Swing	+12.5	

=== 2020 ===
Results of the 2020 Iowa's 1st congressional district election

2020 Iowa's 1st congressional district election
Party	Candidate	Votes	%	±%
Republican	Ashley Hinson	211,679	51.3	+5.4
Democratic	Abby Finkenauer (incumbent)	200,893	48.7	−2.2
Majority		10,786	2.6	
Turnout		412,572	100	
Republican gain from Democratic		Swing	7.6	

=== 2022 ===
2022 Iowa's 1st congressional district election
Party	Candidate	Votes	%
Republican	Mariannette Miller-Meeks (incumbent)	162,947	53.3
Democratic	Christina Bohannan	142,173	46.6
Write-in		260	0.1
Total votes		305,380	100.0
Republican hold			

=== 2024 ===
2024 Iowa's 1st congressional district election
Party	Candidate	Votes	%
Republican	Mariannette Miller-Meeks (incumbent)	206,955	49.98
Democratic	Christina Bohannan	206,157	49.79
Write-in		967	0.23
Total votes		414,078	100.0
Republican hold			

== Historical district boundaries ==
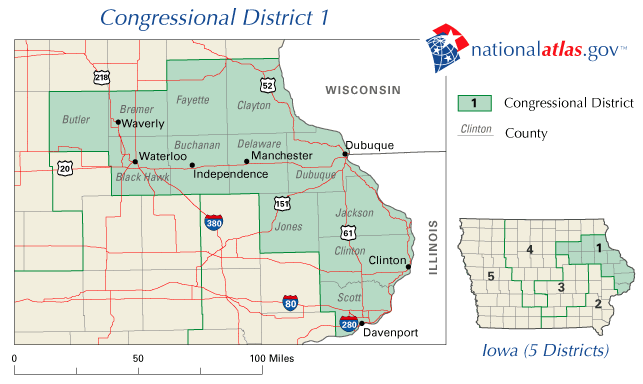
2003–2013

== See also ==
- Iowa's congressional districts
- List of United States congressional districts
