= Schmidhauser =

Schmidhauser is a surname. Notable people with the surname include:

- Corinne Schmidhauser (born 1964), Swiss alpine skier
- Hannes Schmidhauser (1926–2000), Swiss actor and footballer
- John R. Schmidhauser (1922–2018), American politician
