= Fred Schwengel =

American politician (1906–1993)

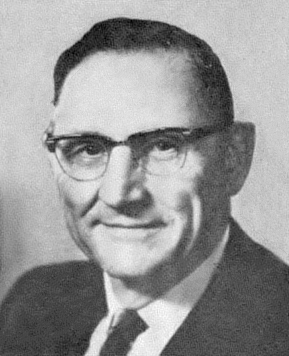

Member of the U.S. House of Representatives from Iowa's 1st district
- In office January 3, 1967 – January 3, 1973
- Preceded by: John Schmidhauser
- Succeeded by: Edward Mezvinsky
- In office January 3, 1955 – January 3, 1965
- Preceded by: Thomas E. Martin
- Succeeded by: John Schmidhauser

Member of the Iowa House of Representatives
- In office 1945–1955

Personal details
- Born: Frederick Delbert Schwengel; May 28, 1906 Sheffield, Iowa
- Died: April 1, 1993 (aged 86) Arlington County, Virginia
- Party: Republican
- Education: Northeast Missouri Teachers College, University of Iowa

Frederick Delbert Schwengel (May 28, 1906 – April 1, 1993) was a Republican U.S. Representative from southeastern Iowa.

== Personal background ==
Born on a farm near Sheffield, Iowa, to German immigrants, Schwengel attended the rural schools in West Fork Township and high schools in Chapin and Sheffield. He graduated from Northeast Missouri Teachers College at Kirksville, Missouri, in 1930 where he was an undergraduate member of Phi Sigma Epsilon fraternity, and attended graduate school at the University of Iowa in Iowa City from 1933 to 1935.

To this day, Truman State University displays a collection of Schwengel's personal collection of Abraham Lincoln historical artifacts that were donated by Schwengel's wife, Ethel, after his death in 1993.

Schwengel had founded the United States Capitol Historical Society in 1962, and continued to serve as its president after his defeat, until 1993. Early in his career, he served as national president of Phi Sigma Epsilon fraternity. He also was a founder and president of the Republican Heritage Foundation. He also served as the President of the Iowa Chamber of Commerce and chairman of the National Civil War Centennial Commission and the Joint Sessions of Congress for the Lincoln Sesquicentennial.

He served in the Missouri National Guard from 1929 to 1936.

He served as athletic coach and instructor of history and political science in public schools of Shelbina, Missouri, and Kirksville, Missouri, from 1930 to 1937. He engaged in the insurance business in Davenport, Iowa, from 1937 to 1954.

== State offices ==
Schwengel was elected to the Iowa House of Representatives in 1944, serving five consecutive terms, from 1945 to 1955. He also served as member of the Iowa Development Commission from 1949 to 1955. As a member of the U.S. House, Schwengel was a member of the Public Works Committee, District of Columbia and House Administration, Republican Task Force on Minority Staffing, and the Wednesday Group.

== Congress ==
In 1954, the Congressman in Iowa's 1st congressional district, Thomas E. Martin, ran for the U.S. Senate. Schwengel ran and won the Republican nomination for the seat, and easily defeated John J. O'Connor in the general election. He won re-election in the following four elections. However, in the 1964 Democratic landslide, Schwengel (like all but one of Iowa's Republican U.S. House members) was defeated. He lost to University of Iowa political science Professor John R. Schmidhauser by fewer than 4,000 votes. But Schmidhauser, like many members of the 1964 freshman class, served only one term; in 1966 Schwengel ran again for his former seat and defeated Schmidhauser by fewer than 5,000 votes, then defeated him again in 1968 by a wider margin. In all, Schwengel served eight terms in Congress.

In 1970 Schwengel narrowly defeated Iowa legislator Edward Mezvinsky by only 765 votes. Redistricting before the 1972 election shifted several Republican areas out of the 1st district, so when Mezvinsky ran against Schwengel a second time in 1972, he won with 53 percent of the vote.

While in Congress, Schwengel was known as one of the more moderate members of the Republican House caucus. While conservative on fiscal issues, he was very pro-labor and pro-civil rights, and was a strong supporter of separation of church and state. Schwengel voted in favor of the Civil Rights Acts of 1957, 1960, 1964, and 1968, as well as the 24th Amendment to the U.S. Constitution. Reportedly, his opposition to school prayer contributed to his 1974 defeat.

== After Congress ==
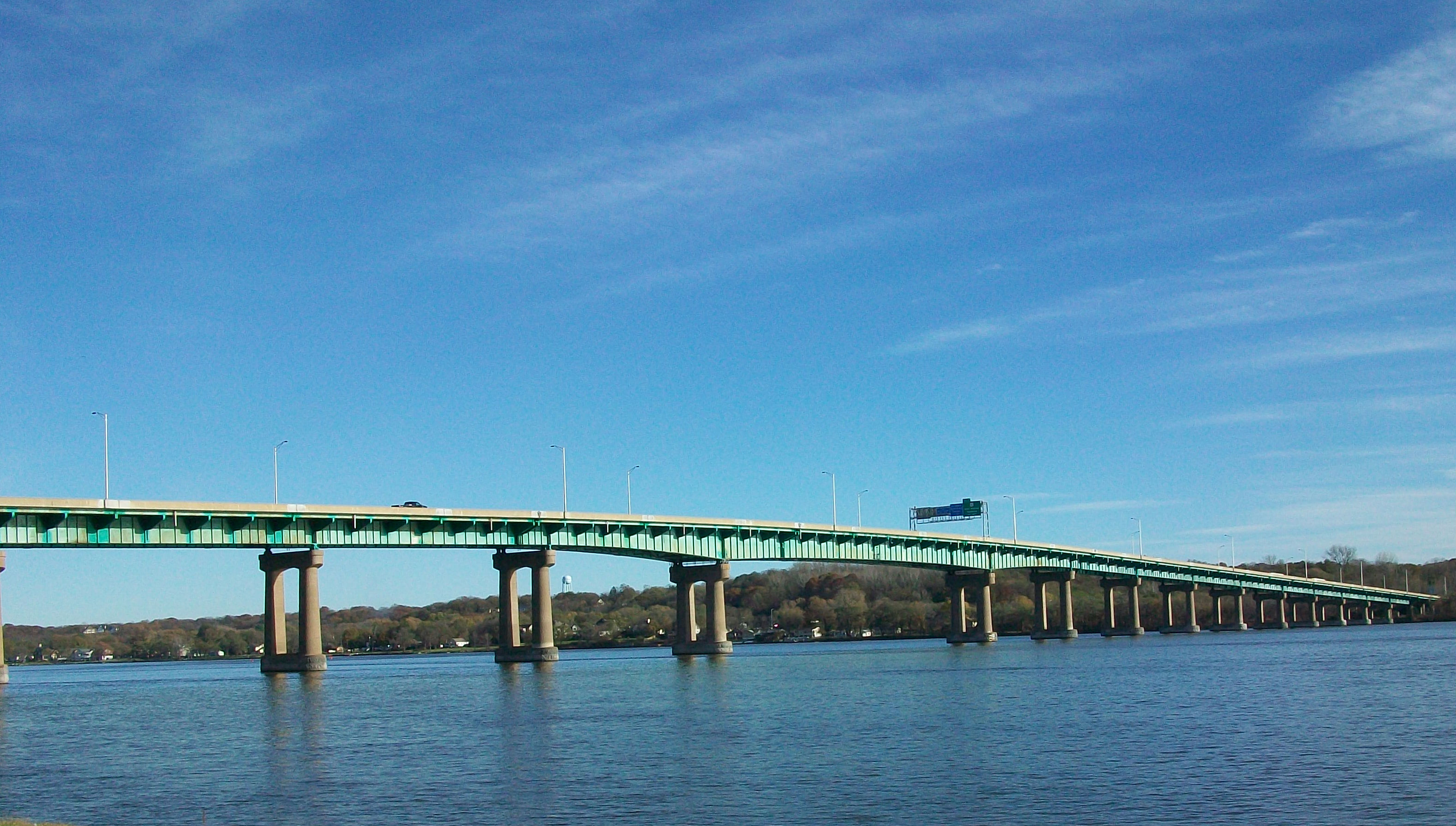
In 1995, the Interstate 80 bridge was renamed to honor Schwengel.

Schwengel had founded the Capitol Historical Society in 1962, and continued to serve as its president after his defeat, until 1993. He also was a founder and president of the Republican Heritage Foundation.

Schwengel received the first JM Dawson Award from the Baptist Joint Committee for Religious Liberty in 1986 for, among other things, his stance against school prayer in 1970 that eventually led to his defeat from Congress.

His collegiate fraternity, Phi Sigma Epsilon, participated in a merger with Phi Sigma Kappa in 1985. At the onset, Schwengel was strongly supportive of this merger, and influential in the decision as a much-loved past president and ritual author for Phi Sigma Epsilon. At its completion, Schwengel agreed to serve as a historian for the combined fraternity and as a trustee of the PSK Foundation.

Schwengel died on April 1, 1993, in Arlington, Virginia. The Interstate 80 bridge crossing the Mississippi River near Davenport, Iowa is named in his honor.

U.S. House of Representatives
| Preceded by Thomas E. Martin | Member of the U.S. House of Representatives from Iowa's 1st congressional district 1955–1965 | Succeeded by John R. Schmidhauser |
| Preceded by John R. Schmidhauser | Member of the U.S. House of Representatives from Iowa's 1st congressional district 1967–1973 | Succeeded by Edward Mezvinsky |
