= Augustus Hall =

American politician (1814–1861)

- Augustus Hall, 1854-1904 Nebraskans

Member of the U.S. House of Representatives from Iowa's 1st district
- In office March 4, 1855 – March 3, 1857
- Preceded by: Bernhart Henn
- Succeeded by: Samuel Ryan Curtis

Personal details
- Born: April 29, 1814 Batavia, New York, U.S.
- Died: February 1, 1861 (aged 46) Bellevue, Nebraska, U.S.
- Resting place: Prospect Hill Cemetery, North Omaha, Nebraska, U.S.
- Party: Democratic

Augustus Hall (April 29, 1814 – February 1, 1861), a lawyer, was a one-term Democratic U.S. Representative from Iowa's 1st congressional district, and chief justice of the Nebraska Territory.

== Biography ==
Born in Batavia, New York, Hall was the son of Samuel Hall, who commanded a colonial company in the War of 1812 and was a member of the Whig Party. He attended the common schools and Middleburgh (New York) Academy, and studied law. He was admitted to the bar in 1836 and commenced practice in Mount Pleasant, Ohio (according to some sources) or Mount Vernon, Ohio (according to his congressional biography). Hall served as assistant United States marshal in 1839, and prosecuting attorney of Union County from 1840 to 1842. In 1844 he moved to Keosauqua, a settlement in the southeast area of what was then Iowa Territory, and later the state of Iowa when Iowa was admitted to the Union in 1846. In 1852 he was chosen by the Democrats as one of the presidential electors and cast his vote for Franklin Pierce, who had carried Iowa.

In 1854, Hall was elected as a Democrat to represent Iowa's 1st congressional district in the U.S. House, defeating Whig candidate R. L. B. Clark. He served in the Thirty-fourth Congress, from March 4, 1855, to March 3, 1857. The 1854 election was the last before the establishment of the Iowa Republican Party, which for decades thereafter dominated most congressional elections in Iowa. In 1856 Hall won the Democratic nomination, but was defeated in the general election by Republican Samuel Curtis.

In 1858, President Buchanan appointed Hall as chief justice of the Nebraska Territory, which then encompassed a vast area west of the Missouri River (to the western edge of the Louisiana Purchase) and north of Kansas Territory (to the Canada–US border). Upon his appointment he immediately moved to Bellevue, Nebraska. He was Chief Justice until his death in Bellevue on February 1, 1861. He was interred in Prospect Hill Cemetery in North Omaha.

Hall and his wife, Jane B. Smith Hall, were the parents of Richard Smith Hall, who became a leading Omaha attorney. Hall was also the father of the horticulturalist Theodosia Burr Shepherd.

Hall County, Nebraska, where Grand Island is located, was reportedly named for Chief Justice Hall, although some attribute the name to a local citizen.

== See also ==
- Founding figures of Omaha, Nebraska

U.S. House of Representatives
Preceded by Bernhart Henn	Member of the U.S. House of Representatives from Iowa's 1st congressional district 1855–1857	Succeeded by Samuel R. Curtis
