= Dodgeville, Iowa =

- Unincorporated community
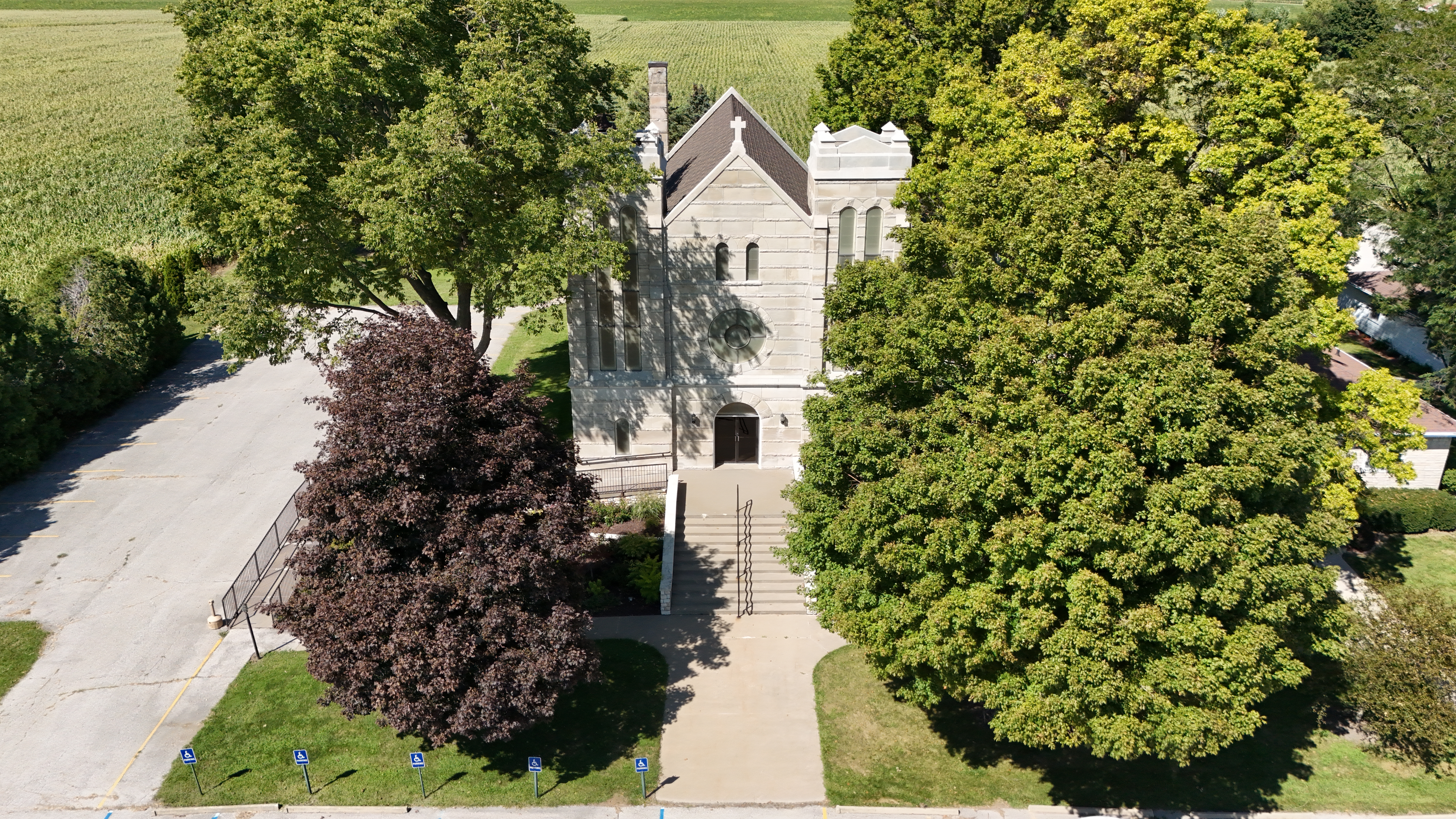
- St. Mary's Church in Dodgeville

- Location within Iowa
- Coordinates: 40°56′35″N 91°10′51″W
- Country: United States
- State: Iowa
- County: Des Moines
- Elevation: 738 ft (225 m)
- Time zone: UTC-6 (Central (CST))
  - Summer (DST): UTC-5 (CDT)
- Area code: 319
- GNIS feature ID: 455937

Dodgeville is an unincorporated community, in Des Moines County, Iowa, United States.

== History ==
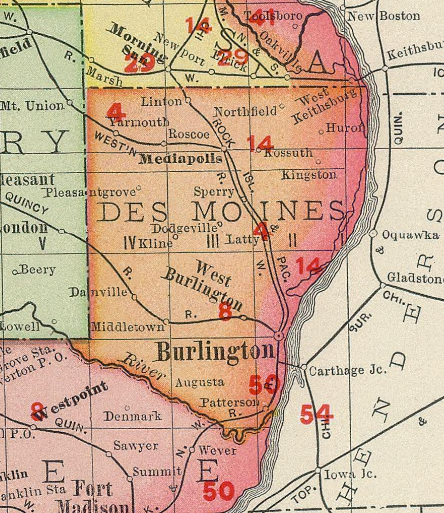
Dodgeville in Des Moines County Iowa, in 1903

Founded in the 1800s, Dodgeville's population was just 17 in 1902, but had increased to 115 by 1925. The population was 33 in 1940.

== Notable person ==
- William F. Kopp, Iowa politician, was born on a farm near Dodgeville.
