= 2008 United States House of Representatives elections in Iowa =

- November 4, 2008

All 5 Iowa seats to the United States House of Representatives
	Majority party	Minority party
Party	Democratic	Republican
Last election	3	2
Seats won	3	2
Seat change	Steady	Steady
Popular vote	759,460	698,241
Percentage	51.25%	47.12%
Swing	▲3.53%	▼3.45%

Democratic
40–50%
50–60%
60–70%
Republican
40–50%
50–60%
60–70%
70–80%
80–90%

The 2008 United States House of Representatives elections in Iowa were held on November 4, 2008, to elect the five U.S. representatives from the State of Iowa, one from each of the state's congressional districts. All five incumbents were re-elected.

== Overview ==
United States House of Representatives elections in Iowa, 2008
Party	Votes	Percentage	Seats	+/–
Democratic	759,460	51.25%	3	—
Republican	698,241	47.12%	2	—
Independents	24,106	1.63%	0	—
Totals	1,481,807	100.00%	5	—

== District 1 ==
2008 Iowa's 1st congressional district election
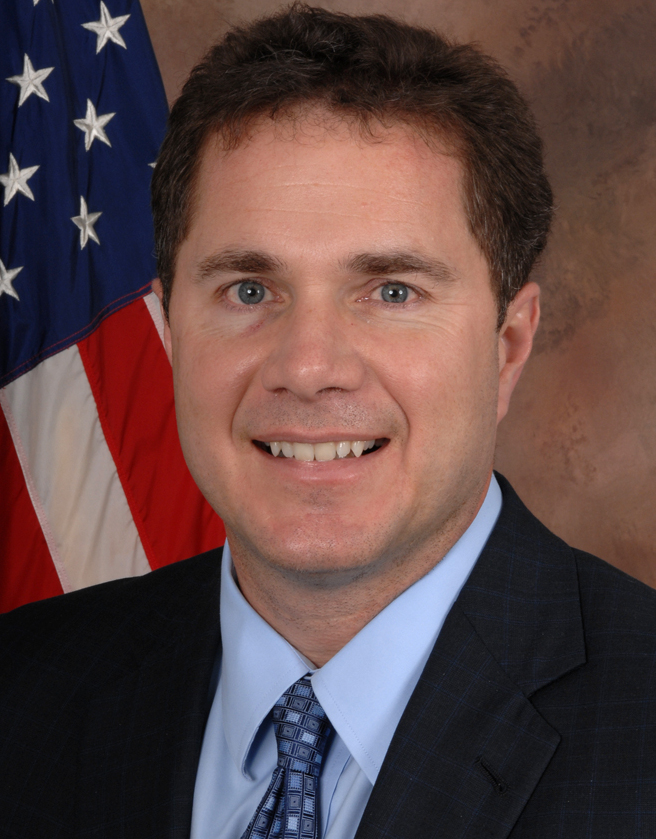

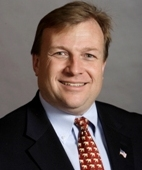
Nominee	Bruce Braley	David Hartsuch
Party	Democratic	Republican
Popular vote	186,991	102,439
Percentage	64.6%	35.4%
- County results Braley: 50–60% 60–70%
U.S. Representatives before election
Bruce Braley
Democratic
Elected U.S. Representatives
Bruce Braley
Democratic

Democrat Bruce Braley, an attorney from Waterloo, the incumbent, was completing his first term. His Republican challenger was state Senator David Hartsuch.

As of 2025, this is the last time a Democrat running for the House received over 60% of the vote in any of Iowa's congressional districts.

=== Predictions ===
Source	Ranking	As of
The Cook Political Report	Safe D	November 6, 2008
Rothenberg	Safe D	November 2, 2008
Sabato's Crystal Ball	Safe D	November 6, 2008
Real Clear Politics	Safe D	November 7, 2008
CQ Politics	Safe D	November 6, 2008

Iowa's 1st congressional district election, 2008
Party	Candidate	Votes	%
Democratic	Bruce Braley (inc.)	186,991	64.61
Republican	David Hartsuch	102,439	35.39
Total votes		289,430	100.00
Democratic hold			

== District 2 ==
2008 Iowa's 2nd congressional district election
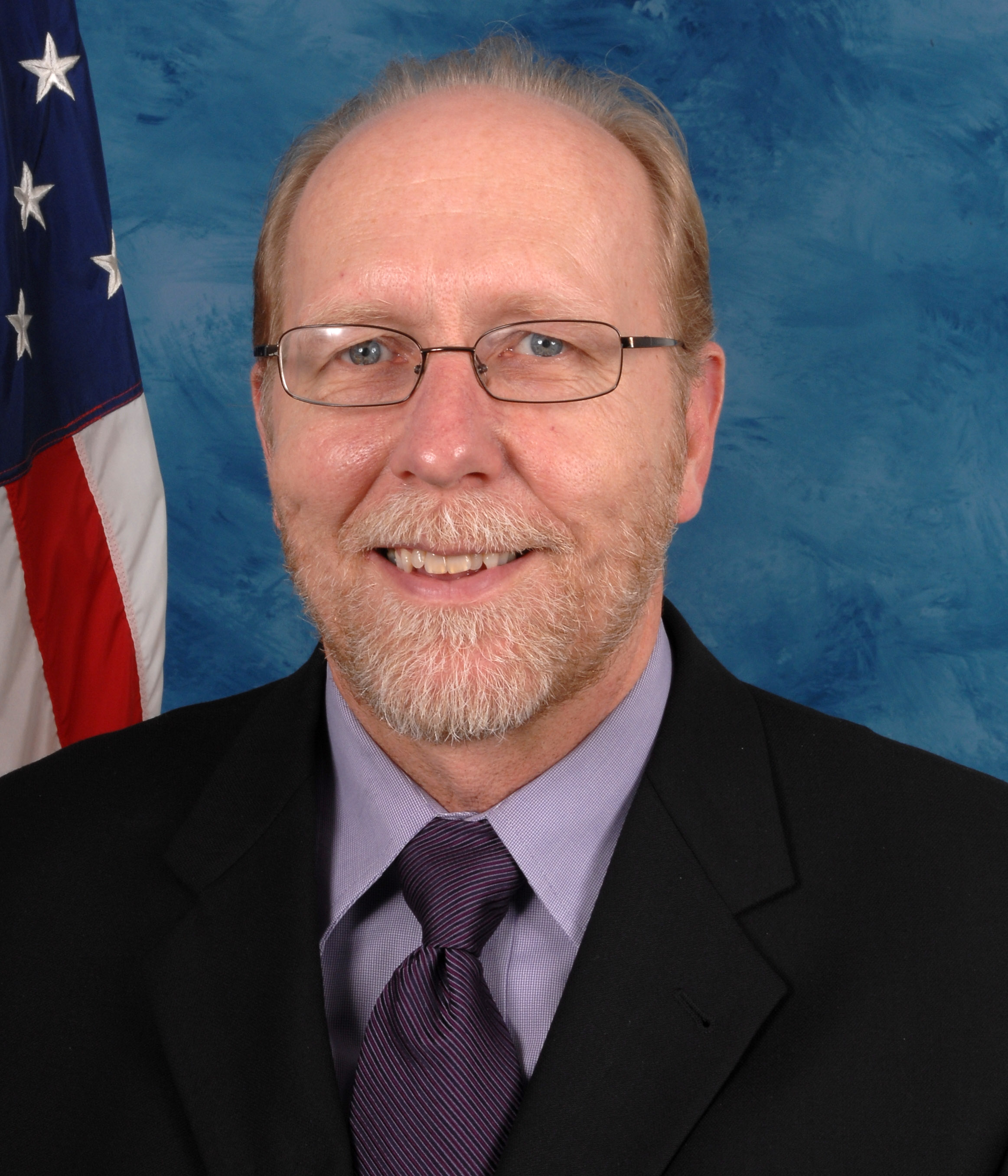

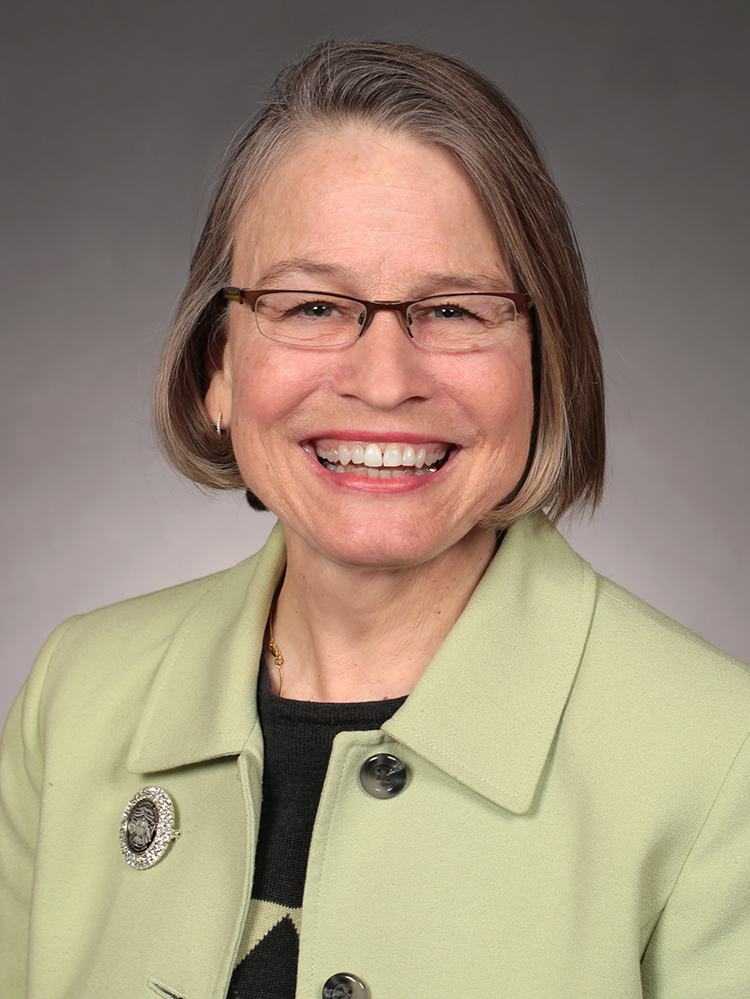
Nominee	Dave Loebsack	Mariannette Miller-Meeks
Party	Democratic	Republican
Popular vote	175,218	118,778
Percentage	57.2%	38.8%
- County results Loebsack: 40–50% 50–60% 60–70% Miller-Meeks: 40–50% 50–60% 60–70%
U.S. Representatives before election
Dave Loebsack
Democratic
Elected U.S. Representatives
Dave Loebsack
Democratic

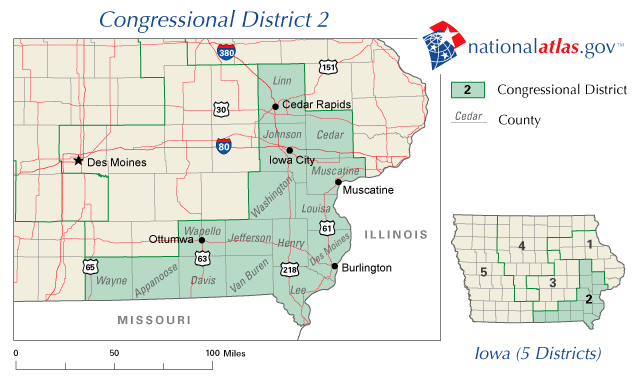

Democrat Dave Loebsack of Mount Vernon, a former political science professor at Cornell College, the incumbent, was also completing his first term. His Republican challenger was U.S. Army Lt. Col. (Ret.) Dr. Mariannette Miller-Meeks of Ottumwa, Iowa. He was also challenged by the Green Party's Wendy Barth and by Brian White, who was nominated by petition.

=== Predictions ===
Source	Ranking	As of
The Cook Political Report	Safe D	November 6, 2008
Rothenberg	Safe D	November 2, 2008
Sabato's Crystal Ball	Safe D	November 6, 2008
Real Clear Politics	Safe D	November 7, 2008
CQ Politics	Safe D	November 6, 2008

Iowa's 2nd congressional district election, 2008
Party	Candidate	Votes	%
Democratic	Dave Loebsack (inc.)	175,218	57.24
Republican	Mariannette Miller-Meeks	118,778	38.80
Green	Wendy Barth	6,664	2.18
Independent	Brian White	5,437	1.78
Total votes		306,097	100.00
Democratic hold			

== District 3 ==
2008 Iowa's 3rd congressional district election
- November 4, 2008
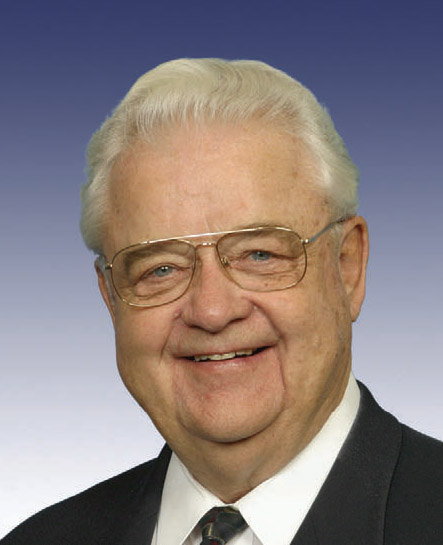

Nominee	Leonard Boswell	Kim Schmett
Party	Democratic	Republican
Popular vote	176,904	132,136
Percentage	56.4%	42.1%
- County results Boswell: 40–50% 50–60% 60–70% Schmett: 50–60%
U.S. Representative before election
Leonard Boswell
Democratic
Elected U.S. Representative
Leonard Boswell
Democratic

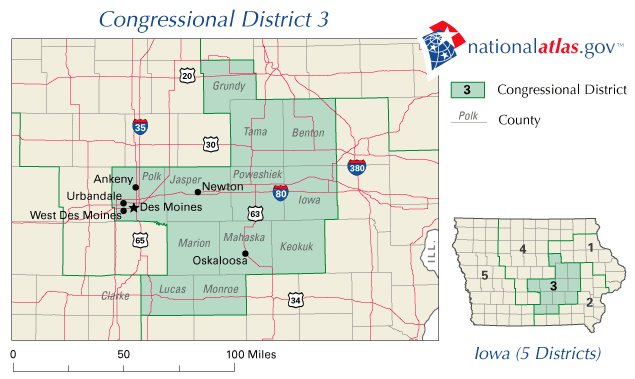

Leonard Boswell, a Democrat from Des Moines, the incumbent, was completing his sixth term. His Republican challenger was Kim Schmett and his Socialist Workers Party challenger was Frank Forrestal.

=== Predictions ===
Source	Ranking	As of
The Cook Political Report	Safe D	November 6, 2008
Rothenberg	Safe D	November 2, 2008
Sabato's Crystal Ball	Safe D	November 6, 2008
Real Clear Politics	Safe D	November 7, 2008
CQ Politics	Safe D	November 6, 2008

Iowa's 3rd congressional district election, 2008
Party	Candidate	Votes	%
Democratic	Leonard Boswell (inc.)	176,904	56.40
Republican	Kim Schmett	132,136	42.13
Socialist Workers	Frank V. Forrestal	4,599	1.46
Total votes		313,639	100.00
Democratic hold			

== District 4 ==
2008 Iowa's 4th congressional district election
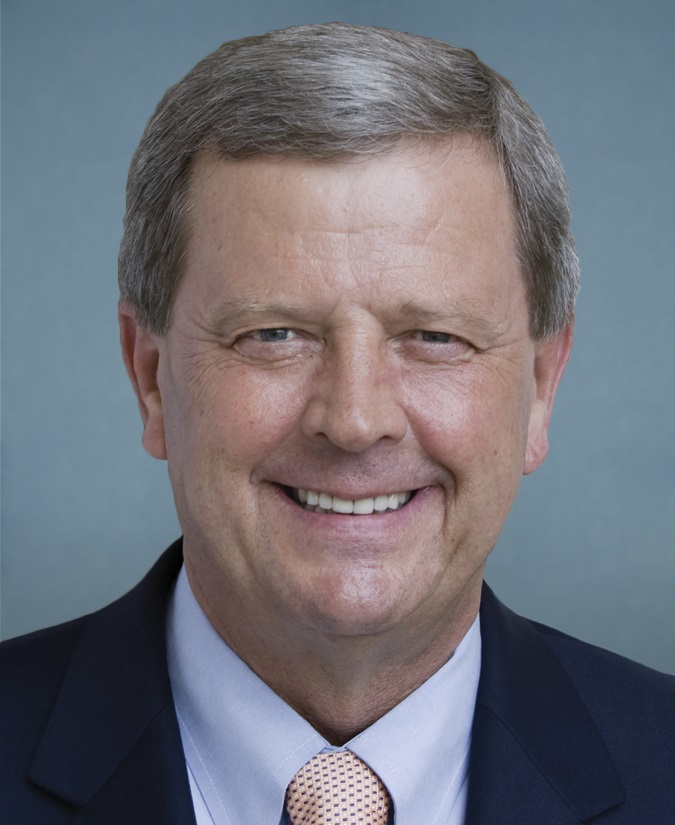

Nominee	Tom Latham	Becky Greenwald
Party	Republican	Democratic
Popular vote	185,458	120,746
Percentage	60.6%	39.4%
- County results Latham: 50–60% 60–70% 70–80%
U.S. Representative before election
Tom Latham (inc.)
Republican
Elected U.S. Representative
Tom Latham
Republican

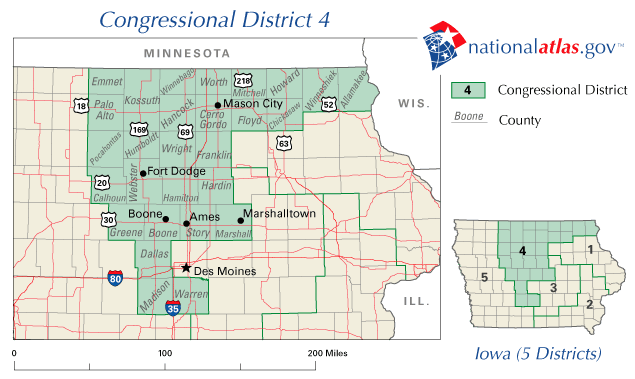

Republican Tom Latham of Alexander, the incumbent, was completing his eighth term. His Democratic challenger was Becky Greenwald.

=== Predictions ===
Source	Ranking	As of
The Cook Political Report	Likely R	November 6, 2008
Rothenberg	Safe R	November 2, 2008
Sabato's Crystal Ball	Lean R	November 6, 2008
Real Clear Politics	Safe R	November 7, 2008
CQ Politics	Likely R	November 6, 2008

Iowa's 4th congressional district election, 2008
Party	Candidate	Votes	%
Republican	Tom Latham (inc.)	185,458	60.57
Democratic	Becky Greenwald	120,746	39.43
Total votes		306,204	100.00
Republican hold			

== District 5 ==
2008 Iowa's 5th congressional district election
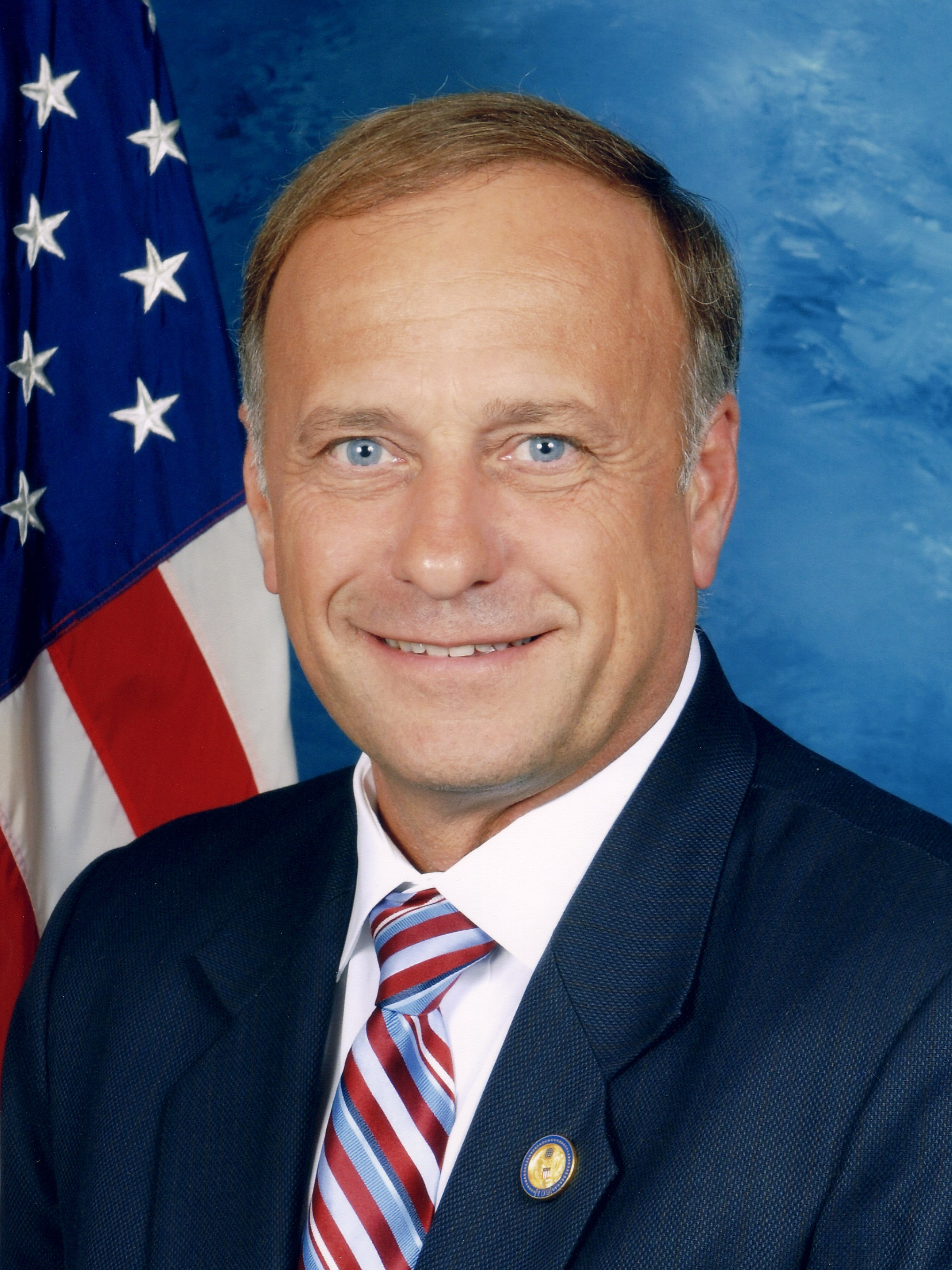

Nominee	Steve King	Rob Hubler
Party	Republican	Democratic
Popular vote	159,430	99,601
Percentage	59.8%	37.4%
U.S. Representative before election
Steve King (inc.)
Republican
Elected U.S. Representative
Steve King
Republican

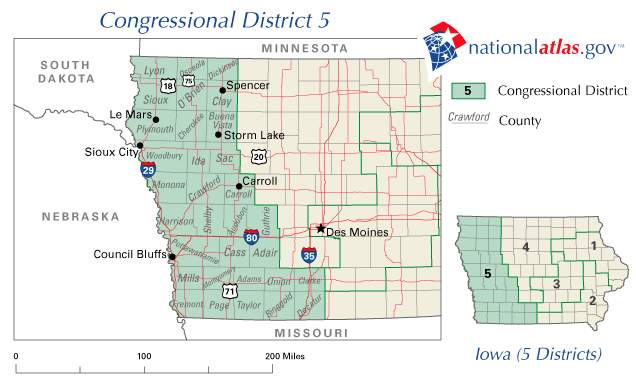

Steve King, a Republican from Kiron, the incumbent, was completing his third term. His Democratic challenger was Rob Hubler and was also challenged by independent candidate Victor Vara.

=== Predictions ===
Source	Ranking	As of
The Cook Political Report	Safe R	November 6, 2008
Rothenberg	Safe R	November 2, 2008
Sabato's Crystal Ball	Safe R	November 6, 2008
Real Clear Politics	Safe R	November 7, 2008
CQ Politics	Safe R	November 6, 2008

Iowa's 5th congressional district election, 2008
Party	Candidate	Votes	%
Republican	Steve King (inc.)	159,430	59.84
Democratic	Rob Hubler	99,601	37.38
Independent	Victor Vara	7,406	2.78
Total votes		266,437	100.00
Republican hold			
