= John R. Schmidhauser =

American politician

John Schmidhauser
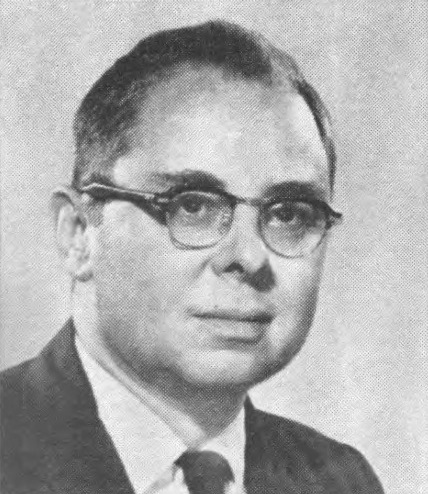

Member of the U.S. House of Representatives from Iowa's 1st district
- In office January 3, 1965 – January 3, 1967
- Preceded by: Fred Schwengel
- Succeeded by: Fred Schwengel

Personal details
- Born: January 3, 1922 The Bronx, New York, U.S.
- Died: February 21, 2018 (aged 96) Santa Barbara, California, U.S.
- Party: Democratic
- Profession: Political Scientist

John Richard Schmidhauser (January 3, 1922 – February 21, 2018) was an American politician who served one term as a Democratic member of the United States House of Representatives from southeastern Iowa, defeating incumbent Republican Fred Schwengel in 1964 but losing to Schwengel two years later in 1966, and again in 1968. He was, until his death in 2018, a professor emeritus of political science at the University of Southern California.

Born in the Bronx, New York, Schmidhauser served in the United States Navy from 1941 to 1945. After the end of World War II, he enrolled in the University of Delaware in Newark, Delaware, receiving a Bachelor of Arts degree in 1949. He received a master's degree from the University of Virginia in Charlottesville, Virginia in 1952, then received a Ph.D. from the same university in 1954.

In 1954, he joined the faculty of the political science department of the University of Iowa, in Iowa City, Iowa. There, he wrote what is now considered a "landmark series of studies on the backgrounds of Supreme Court justices." In what was then considered revolutionary, he archived his data with the Interuniversity Consortium for Political and Social Research (ICPSR) which has enabled many other scholars to use his data in their own studies, and served as the foundation for the new U.S. Supreme Court Justices Database.

In 1964, as part of a Democratic landslide, Schmidhauser was elected to represent Iowa's 1st congressional district in the U.S. House of Representatives. defeating incumbent Republican Fred Schwengel. However, like many other freshman Democrats elected in 1964 in Republican-leaning districts, Schmidhauser served only one term. Schwengel regained his seat from Schmidhauser in 1966. Schmidhauser then returned to Iowa City and rejoined the faculty of the University of Iowa. In 1968 he again attempted to defeat Schwengel, receiving the democratic party's nomination but losing to Schwengel in the general election.

In 1972, Schmidhauser tried and failed to receive the nomination of his party for the seat he previously held, losing to future U.S. House of Representatives member Edward Mezvinsky.

The following year, he accepted a position as a professor at the University of Southern California in Los Angeles, California, a position he held from 1973 to 1992, except when serving as a visiting professor at the University of Virginia from 1982 to 1983, and at Simon Fraser University, in Burnaby, British Columbia, in 1984. From 1992 he served as a professor emeritus at USC. Schmidhauser died on February 21, 2018 at the age of 96.

U.S. House of Representatives
Preceded by Fred Schwengel	Member of the U.S. House of Representatives from Iowa's 1st congressional district 1965–1967	Succeeded by Fred Schwengel
