= Samuel M. Clark =

American politician (1842–1900)

Samuel Mercer Clark
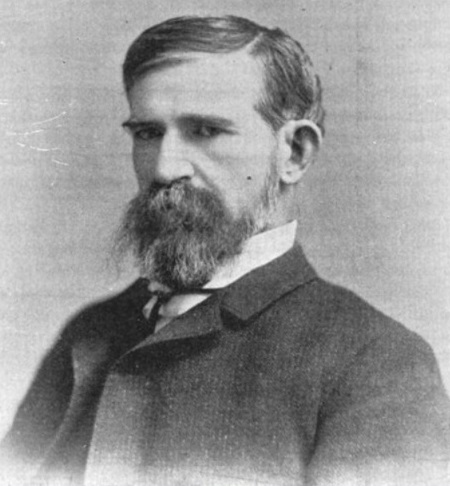
- From the April 1901 issue of The Iowa Historical Record magazine

Member of the U.S. House of Representatives from Iowa's 1st district
- In office March 4, 1895 – March 3, 1899
- Preceded by: John H. Gear
- Succeeded by: Thomas Hedge

Personal details
- Born: October 11, 1842 Keosauqua, Iowa Territory
- Died: August 11, 1900 (aged 57) Keokuk, Iowa, U.S.
- Resting place: Oakland Cemetery
- Party: Republican

Samuel Mercer Clark (October 11, 1842 – August 11, 1900) was a two-term Republican U.S. Representative from Iowa's 1st congressional district at the end of the 19th century. He was the first Iowa-born member of Congress.

== Early years ==
Born near Keosauqua in the portion of Iowa Territory that would later become the State of Iowa, Clark attended the public schools and the Des Moines Valley College, in West Point, Iowa. He went on to study law in the office of Judge (and future U.S. Senator) George G. Wright and was admitted to the Iowa bar in 1864. However, he did not practice extensively.

== Career ==
He was editor of the Keokuk Daily Gate City in Keokuk, Iowa, for 31 years. He served as delegate to the Republican National Conventions in 1872, 1876, and 1880.

He was appointed commissioner of education to the Paris Exposition in 1889. He served as Keokuk's Postmaster from 1879 to 1885. He was a member of the Keokuk Board of Education from 1879 to 1894, and served as the Board's president from 1882 until 1894.

In 1894, Clark was elected as a Republican to represent Iowa's 1st congressional district (in southeastern Iowa) in the Fifty-fourth Congress. He replaced John H. Gear, whom the Iowa General Assembly had chosen to serve as a U.S. Senator. Two years later Clark won re-election, and served in the Fifty-fifth Congress. He was not a candidate for renomination in 1898. In all, he served in Congress from March 4, 1895, to March 3, 1899. After returning to Iowa, he resumed his editorial duties in Keokuk.

== Death ==
He died in Keokuk on August 11, 1900, aged 57. He was interred in Oakland Cemetery.

U.S. House of Representatives
Preceded by John H. Gear	Member of the U.S. House of Representatives from Iowa's 1st congressional district 1895–1899	Succeeded by Thomas Hedge
