= Bernhart Henn =

American politician

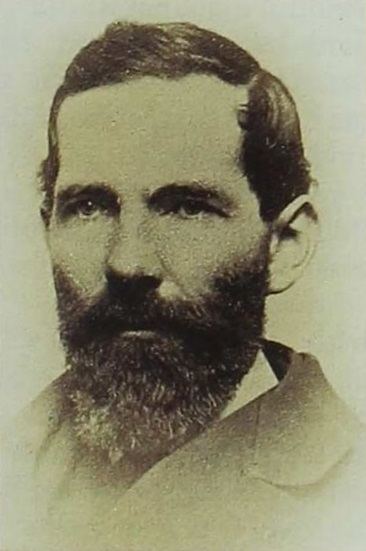
- From the July–October 1913 issue of Annals of Iowa magazine

Member of the U.S. House of Representatives from Iowa's 1st district
- In office March 4, 1851 – March 3, 1855
- Preceded by: Daniel F. Miller
- Succeeded by: Augustus Hall

Personal details
- Born: 1817 Cherry Valley, New York, U.S.
- Died: August 30, 1865 (age 47-48) Fairfield, Iowa, U.S.
- Resting place: Evergreen Cemetery
- Party: Democratic

Bernhart Henn (1817 – August 30, 1865) was a pioneer lawyer and businessman, and a two-term Democratic U.S. Representative from Iowa's 1st congressional district during Iowa's first decade of statehood.

Henn was born in Cherry Valley, New York in 1817. He attended the common schools and moved to what is now Burlington, Iowa, then capital of Iowa Territory, in 1838. He studied law and was admitted to the bar in Burlington. He later moved to Fairfield, Iowa, when he was appointed register of the United States General Land Office in 1845 by President James K. Polk.

In 1850 he was elected to represent Iowa's 1st congressional district in the U.S. House. While he was officially considered a Democrat, a hostile editor of the first Burlington newspaper (James G. Edwards of the "Hawk-Eye") labelled him a "Locofoco," a slang term for a radical faction of the Party. He initially served in the Thirty-second Congress. After he ran for, and won, re-election in 1852, he served in the Thirty-third Congress.

In December 1854, Henn tried and failed to win election in the Iowa General Assembly to the U.S. Senate, losing to James Harlan. Meanwhile, Augustus Hall, another Democrat, had won election to Henn's House seat. In all, Henn served in the U.S. House from March 4, 1851, to March 3, 1855.

After leaving Congress, Henn engaged in banking and dealing in real estate. He died on August 30, 1865, in Fairfield. He was interred there, in Evergreen Cemetery.

== See also ==
- Henn Mansion in Fairfield, listed on the National Register of Historic Places

U.S. House of Representatives
Preceded by Daniel F. Miller	Member of the U.S. House of Representatives from Iowa's 1st congressional district 1851–1855	Succeeded by Augustus Hall
