= Thomas Hedge =

American politician

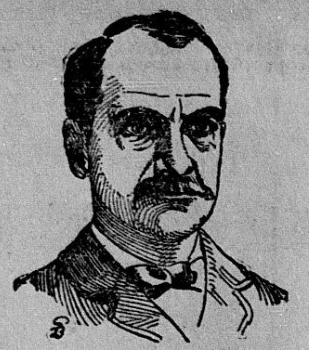
- Sketch of Hedge circa 1911

Member of the U.S. House of Representatives from Iowa's 1st district
- In office March 4, 1899-March 3, 1907
- Preceded by: Samuel M. Clark
- Succeeded by: Charles A. Kennedy

Personal details
- Born: June 24, 1844 Burlington, Iowa Territory
- Died: November 28, 1920 (aged 76) Burlington, Iowa, U.S.
- Resting place: Aspen Grove Cemetery; Burlington, Iowa, U.S.
- Spouse: Mary Frances Cook (m. 1873)
- Children: 3
- Education: Yale College; Columbia College Law School
- Occupation: Lawyer; politician

Military service
- Allegiance: United States
- Branch/service: Union Army
- Rank: Second lieutenant
- Unit: 106th New York Volunteer Infantry Regiment
- Battles/wars: American Civil War

Thomas Hedge (June 24, 1844 – November 28, 1920) was a four-term Republican U.S. Representative from Iowa's 1st congressional district, in southeastern Iowa.

== Early life ==
Thomas Hedge was born on June 24, 1844, in Burlington, Iowa Territory, Hedge attended the common schools, including the North Hill school in Burlington, and Denmark (Iowa) Academy. He graduated from Phillips Academy in Andover, Massachusetts, in 1861, but his education was interrupted by the Civil War. In 1864 and 1865 he served as a private in Company E and as second lieutenant in Company G of the 106th New York Volunteer Infantry Regiment.

He graduated from Yale College in New Haven, Connecticut, in 1867, where he was a member of Skull and Bones, and Columbia College Law School in New York City in 1869. He was admitted to the bar in New York in 1869, and returned to Iowa to practice law in Burlington.

== Career ==
For twenty years, Hedge practiced in a partnership with Iowa Republican politician J.W. Blythe, with the Chicago, Burlington and Quincy Railroad as one of the firm's clients.

In 1898, Hedge was elected as a Republican to the U.S. House seat for Iowa's 1st congressional district, then held by Republican Samuel M. Clark (who chose not to seek re-election). Hedge served in the Fifty-sixth and the three succeeding Congresses. In 1906 he did not seek re-nomination. In all, he served in Congress from March 4, 1899, to March 3, 1907.

After leaving Congress, he resumed the practice of law.

== Personal life ==
Hedge married Mary Frances Cook of Burlington in January 1873. They had three children: Thomas Jr., Lyman Cook and Anna Louise.

Hedge died at his home in Burlington on November 28, 1920. He was interred in Aspen Grove Cemetery.

U.S. House of Representatives
| Preceded by Samuel M. Clark | Member of the U.S. House of Representatives from Iowa's 1st congressional district 1899–1907 | Succeeded by Charles A. Kennedy |
