= Delazon Smith =

American journalist and politician (1816–1860)

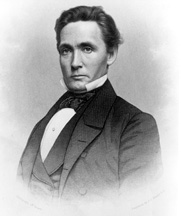

United States Senator from Oregon
- In office February 14, 1859 – March 3, 1859
- Preceded by: Himself (Shadow Senator)
- Succeeded by: Edward Baker

United States Shadow Senator from the Oregon Territory
- In office July 5, 1858 – February 14, 1859
- Preceded by: Seat established
- Succeeded by: Himself (U.S. Senator)

Personal details
- Born: October 5, 1816 New Berlin, New York, U.S.
- Died: November 19, 1860 (aged 44) Portland, Oregon, U.S.
- Party: Democratic
- Education: Oberlin College

Delazon Smith (October 5, 1816 – November 19, 1860) was a Democratic Party politician who briefly represented the state of Oregon in the U.S. Senate in 1859. He served for less than one month (February 14 to March 3), making his term among the shortest on record in the Senate. Smith was also a newspaper editor in New York and Ohio, and served in the Oregon Territory's legislature.

According to the obituary in the Chicago Tribune, "The adventurous character of Mr. Smith, and the noted eccentricity of his career, had given him a notoriety greater than is usual to men of a similar grade of ability and attainment."

== Early life ==
Smith was born in New Berlin, New York on October 5, 1816. He was expelled from Oberlin College in Ohio in 1837, and excommunicated from "the church". He then began the study of law. and soon was admitted to the bar. In 1838 he established the New York Watchman newspaper in Rochester, New York, which he edited for two years. Smith also edited the True Jeffersonian and the Western Herald in Rochester for a time in 1840. In 1841, he founded the Western Empire in Dayton, Ohio.

== Anti-abolitionist ==
Like most Democrats at the time, Delazon was opposed to the abolition of American slavery. Smith was opposed to Oberlin's admission of Black students and the role he claimed Oberlin students played in helping escaped slaves. He expressed contempt for the interracial friendships– and, he claimed, romantic relationships– he saw around him in college.

== Politics ==
Smith's career in politics began when he was appointed a special United States commissioner to Quito, Ecuador, serving in this capacity from 1842 to 1845. He then moved to the Iowa Territory in 1846 and became a minister. In 1850, he ran in the Iowa 1st district special election as an Independent receiving 3.43% of the vote. In 1852 he moved to the Oregon Territory and began editing the Oregon Democrat. In 1854 he was elected to the Territorial House of Representatives. There he served as Speaker of the House during the 1855 to 1856 session. The following session was his last as a representative of Linn County. In 1857 Smith was a delegate to the state's constitutional convention of that prepared the first constitution in preparation for statehood. Upon Oregon's admission to the Union as the 33rd state, Smith was elected to the Senate, serving from February 14 to March 4, 1859. He was an unsuccessful candidate for re-election.

Less than two years after leaving the Senate, Delazon Smith died in Portland on November 19, 1860, at the age of 44 years. His interment was at Albany, Oregon in the Masonic Cemetery.

== Works authored ==
- A History of Oberlin, or New Lights of the West. Cleveland, 1837.

U.S. Senate
New seat	U.S. Shadow Senator (Class 2) from the Oregon Territory; 1858–1859; Served alongside: Joseph Lane	Succeeded by Himself as U.S. Senator
Preceded by Himself as Shadow Senator	U.S. Senator (Class 2) from Oregon; 1859; Served alongside: Joseph Lane	Succeeded by Edward Baker
