= Fred Schwengel Memorial Bridge =

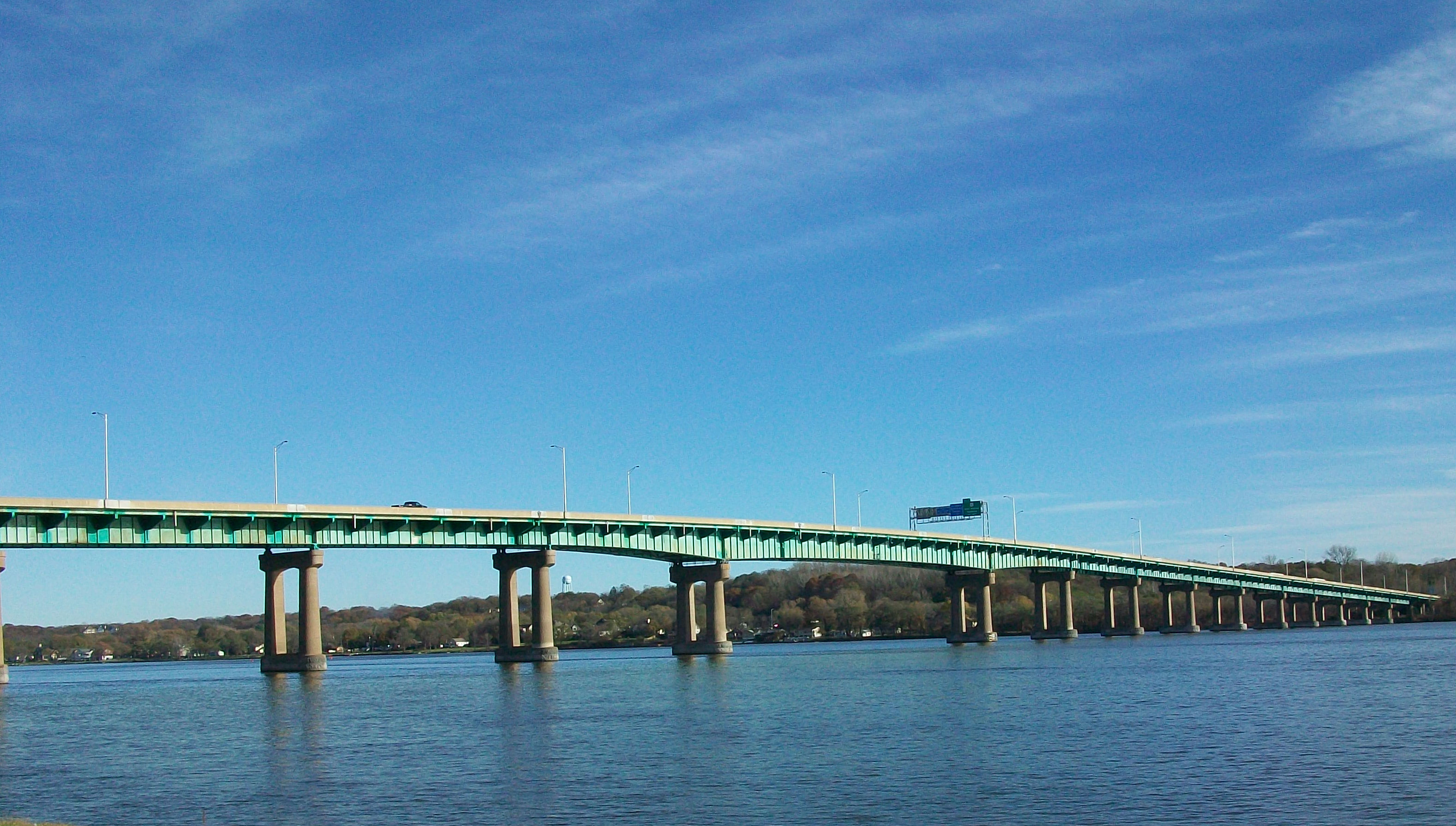
- Coordinates: 41°34′49″N 90°21′54″W
- Carries: 4 lanes of I-80
- Crosses: Mississippi River
- Locale: LeClaire, Iowa and Rapids City, Illinois
- Maintained by: Illinois Department of Transportation

Characteristics
- Design: Steel girder bridge
- Material: Steel
- Total length: 3,483 feet (1,062 m)
- Width: 66 feet (20 m)

History
- Designer: Iowa State Highway Commission
- Constructed by: Industrial Construction Company of Minneapolis, Roy Ryan & Sons of Evanston, and Gould Construction Company of Davenport
- Opened: October 27, 1966

Statistics
- Daily traffic: 33,500

Location
- Interactive map of Fred Schwengel Memorial Bridge

The Fred Schwengel Memorial Bridge is a 4-lane steel girder bridge that carries Interstate 80 across the Mississippi River between LeClaire, Iowa and Rapids City, Illinois. The bridge is named for Fred Schwengel, a former U.S. Representative from Davenport, Iowa and one of the driving forces behind the Interstate Highway Act. The structure was designed by the Iowa State Highway Commission, and was built by the Industrial Construction Company of Minneapolis (contractor), Gould Construction Company of Davenport, and Roy Ryan & Sons of Evanston, Indiana who was responsible for the substructure. The bridge opened on October 27, 1966, and is maintained by the Illinois Department of Transportation. It underwent a major rehabilitation project in 1996.

== History ==
On October 5, 1964, a 40-foot steel and wood form was swinging from its roadstead on pier No. 13 after cement was being dumped on it. In 1965, structural steel was installed on the bridge. During that year, officials inspected the bridge. On June 29, 1966, the bridge's center span was installed. The bridge opened to traffic on October 27, 1966.

In 1995, the bridge was renamed for former U.S. Representative Fred Schwengel. He was among the attendees of the October 27, 1966 bridge opening.

== Temporary closures ==
In 2008, the bridge was closed for two months after inspectors found cracks in the steel under the bridge deck. On May 12, 2009, the eastbound lane of the bridge closed after a crack was found in the top flange of the beam. As a result, inspectors visited the bridge and determined on how to repair the beam. The bridge reopened in August 2009. On April 10, 2015, the westbound lanes of the bridge closed for repairs on the joints and reopened on April 14, 2015.

== Replacement ==
In 2020, the Illinois Department of Transportation began a study, which is expected to cost $20,000, to replace the bridge. The plan from 2020 to 2025 is to spend $304.5 million on the bridge. By 2025, Illinois is expected to spend $23 billion on concrete, as well as fixing and expanding 4,200 miles (6,800 km) of roadways and 9 million square feet (836,000 m²) of bridge decks. The Illinois department will be the lead agency on the project with the state of Iowa sharing in the costs.

It was announced in late October 2024, that the new bridge will include two spans in place of the original single span. A separate multi-use pathway for bicyclists and pedestrians will be included as well as upgrades to the interchanges at both ends of the bridge. Construction is expected to begin in 2028 and last four years.

=== Bison Bridge ===
On March 18, 2021, a plan was announced by Chad Pregracke to repurpose the Fred Schwengel Memorial Bridge into a national park. The proposal gives an estimate that taxpayers would save 30 to 40 million dollars by foregoing the demolition of the bridge. The project would allow both bison and pedestrians to roam freely between Iowa and Illinois and also place a visitor center directly on the bridge.

== See also ==
- List of crossings of the Upper Mississippi River
