= William F. Kopp =

American politician (1869–1938)

William Kopp
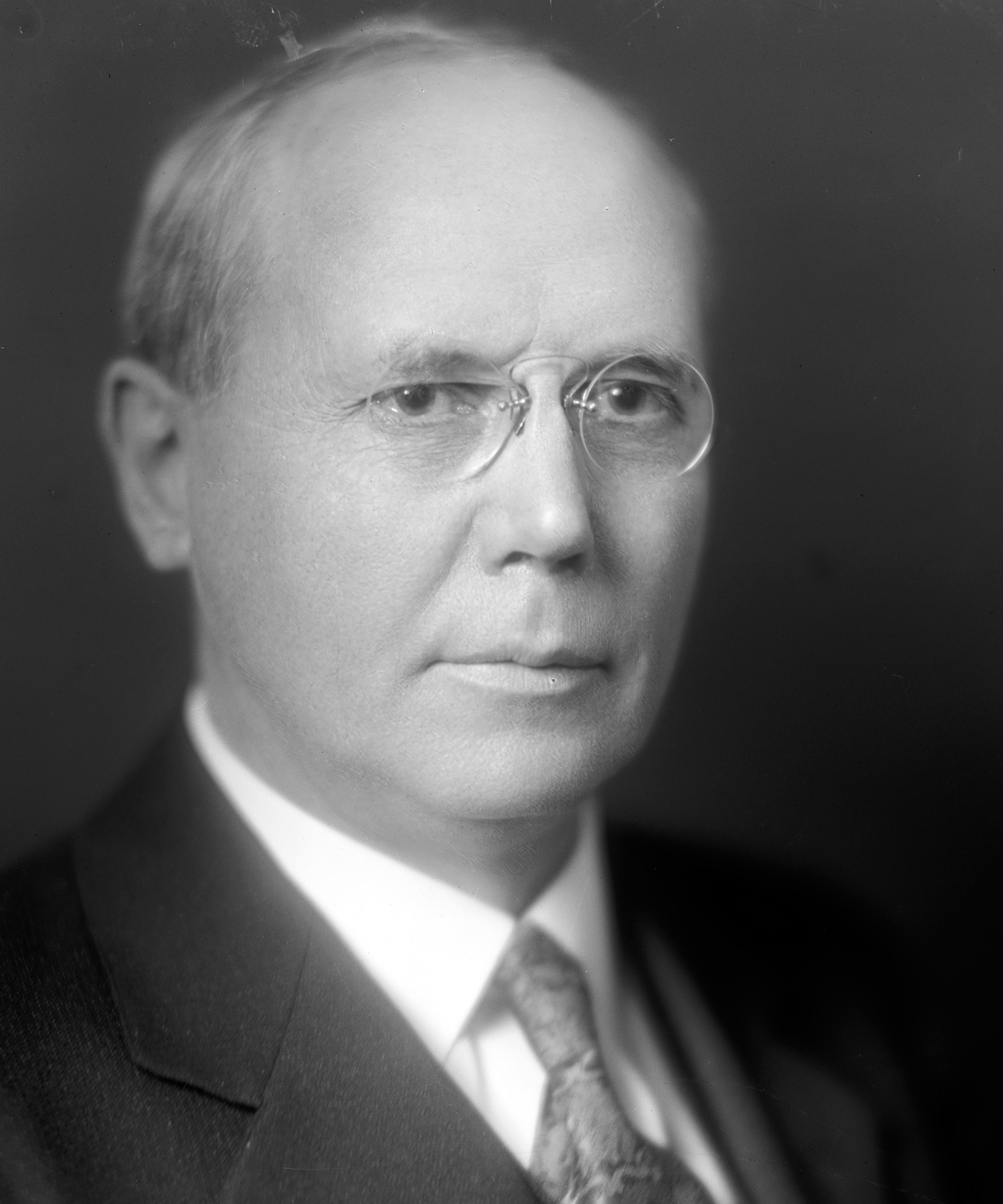

Member of the U.S. House of Representatives from Iowa's 1st district
- In office March 4, 1921 – March 3, 1933
- Preceded by: Charles A. Kennedy
- Succeeded by: Edward C. Eicher

Personal details
- Born: June 20, 1869 Dodgeville, Iowa, U.S.
- Died: August 24, 1938 (aged 69) Mount Pleasant, Iowa, U.S
- Party: Republican
- Education: Iowa Wesleyan University; University of Iowa

William Frederick Kopp (June 20, 1869 – August 24, 1938) was a six-term Republican U.S. Representative from Iowa's 1st congressional district.

Born near Dodgeville, Iowa, Kopp attended the common schools. He was graduated from Iowa Wesleyan College at Mount Pleasant in 1892 and from the University of Iowa College of Law at Iowa City in 1894. He was admitted to the bar in 1894 and commenced practice in Mount Pleasant. He served as prosecuting attorney of Henry County, Iowa, from 1895 to 1899. He later served as Postmaster of Mount Pleasant from 1906 to 1914, and as a member of the board of trustees of Iowa Wesleyan College from 1908 to 1938.

Kopp was elected to the Iowa House of Representatives in 1914, and served a single two-year term that ended in early 1917.

In 1920, Kopp was elected as a Republican to the first of six consecutive terms in the U.S. House, representing Iowa's 1st congressional district in the Sixty-seventh and to the five succeeding Congresses. He served as chairman of the Committee on Expenditures in the Department of the Navy (in the Sixty-eighth Congress), Committee on Labor (in the Sixty-ninth through Seventy-first Congresses), and the Committee on Pensions (in the Seventy-first Congress).

In 1932, Kopp, like many other Republican candidates for Congress, was defeated in the Roosevelt landslide. Kopp was defeated by Washington, Iowa, attorney Edward C. Eicher. In all, Kopp served in the House from March 4, 1921, to March 3, 1933.

Kopp returned to practice law at Mount Pleasant, Iowa, until his death there on August 24, 1938. He was interred in Forest Home Cemetery.

U.S. House of Representatives
Preceded by Charles A. Kennedy	Member of the U.S. House of Representatives from Iowa's 1st congressional district 1921–1933	Succeeded by Edward C. Eicher
