= Theodosia Burr Shepherd =

American botanist, horticulturist

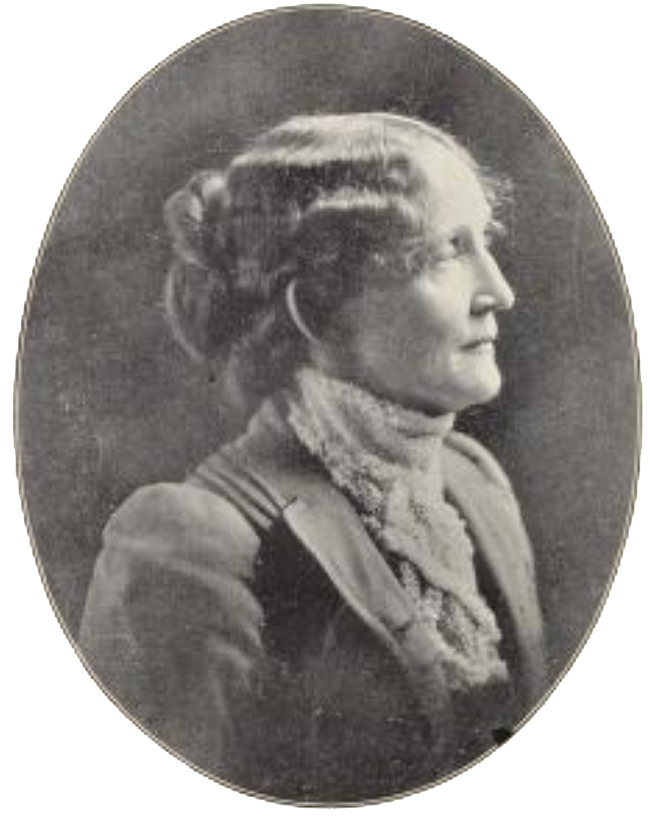
- Theodosia Burr Shepherd, ca. 1902
- Born: October 14, 1845; Keosauqua, Iowa
- Died: September 6, 1906 (aged 60); Ventura, California
- Occupations: Plant breeder, Horticulturist
- Spouse: William Edgar Shepherd
- Children: Myrtle Shepherd Francis
- Parent(s): Augustus Hall and Ellen P. (Lee) Hall

Theodosia Burr Shepherd (October 14, 1845, Keosauqua, Iowa – September 6, 1906, Ventura, California) was an American botanist, horticulturist and pioneer in plant breeding. Called the "Flower Wizard of California," and "The Pioneer Seed-grower," Shepherd was the first woman in California, and possibly the first woman in the United States, to hybridize flowers.

The Theodosia B. Shepherd Company, her seed and bulb business, is considered to be the foundation of California's seed industry. She was compared favorably to Luther Burbank. The location of her former garden is listed as number 34 in the City of Ventura Historic Landmarks and Districts.

== Early life ==
Theodosia Burr Hall was born in Keosauqua, a settlement in the Iowa Territory, on October 14, 1845. Her parents were Augustus Hall and Ellen P. (Lee) Hall. In 1854, Augustus Hall was elected as the Democratic candidate to Congress in the First District. In 1857, he became a Chief Justice of the Nebraska Territory. Theodosia grew up in Iowa, where she went to school. From 1857 to 1859, she boarded at a finishing school in Batavia, New York run by Ruth Beardsley Bryan.

Theodosia Burr Hall married lawyer William Edgar Shepherd of Oskaloosa, Iowa, in Bellevue, Nebraska, on either September 4, 1866, September 9, 1866 or September 4, 1867. They had four children: Augustus H., Myrtle Ellen (later Lloyd, later Francis), Margaret (later Oaks), and Edith (later Mrs. Fred Kelsey.) Theodosia suffered from tuberculosis, or "lung trouble". In 1873, the family moved to California in search of a more healthful climate. They settled in "Ventura-by-the-Sea," where William Edgar Shepherd became the editor of the Ventura Signal.

== Horticulture ==
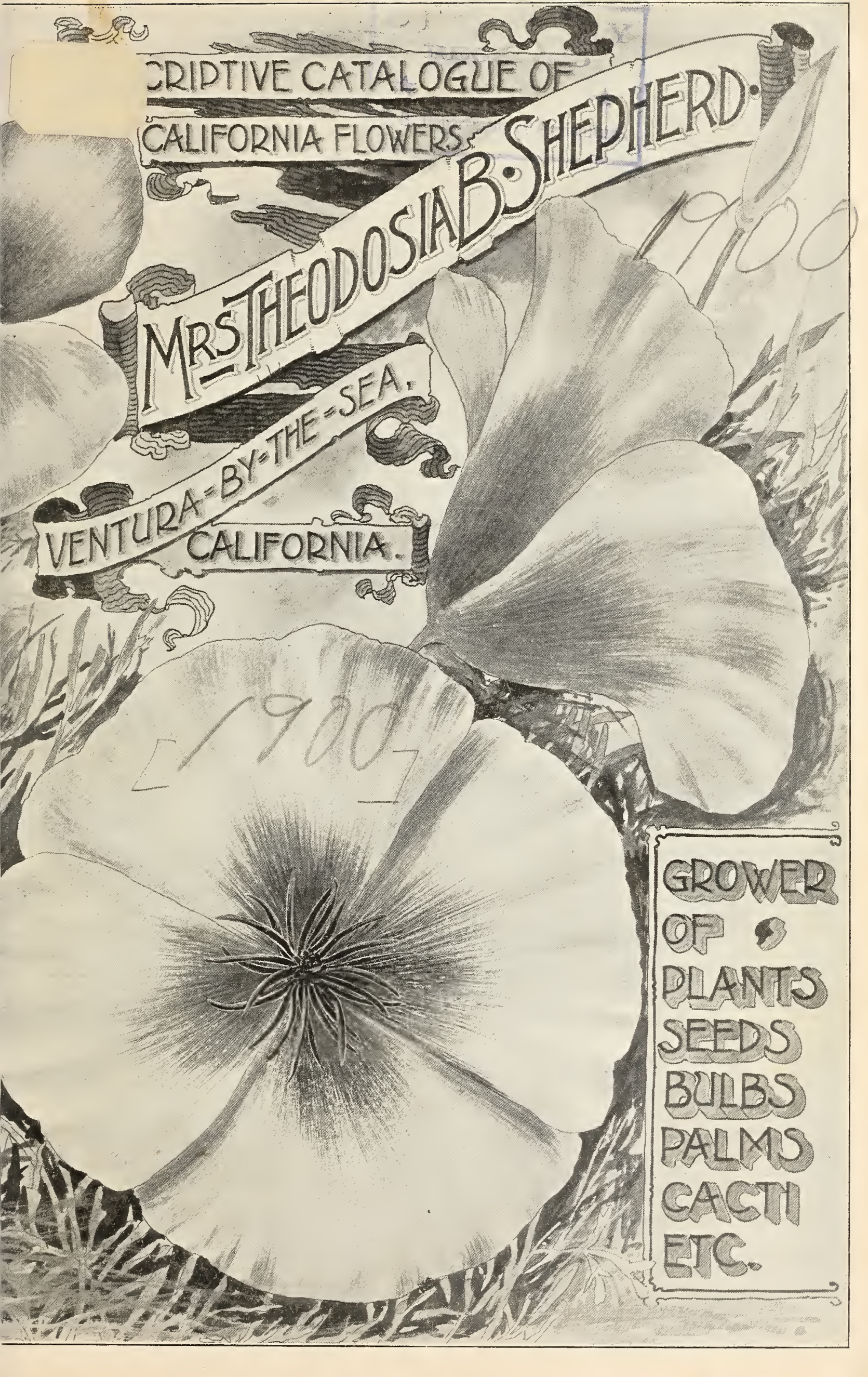
Cover, Theodosia B Shepherd Company Catalogue, 1900

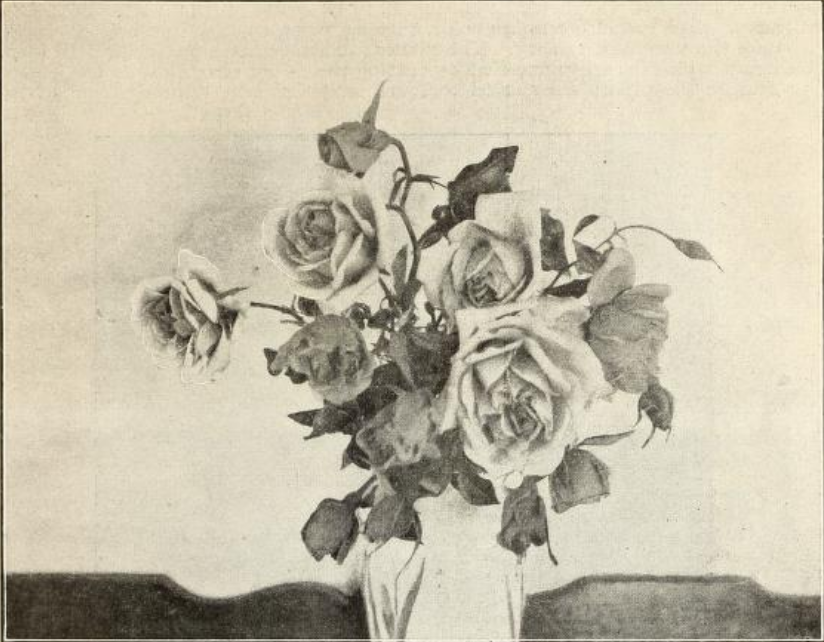
Mrs. Shepherd's Rose 'Oriole'

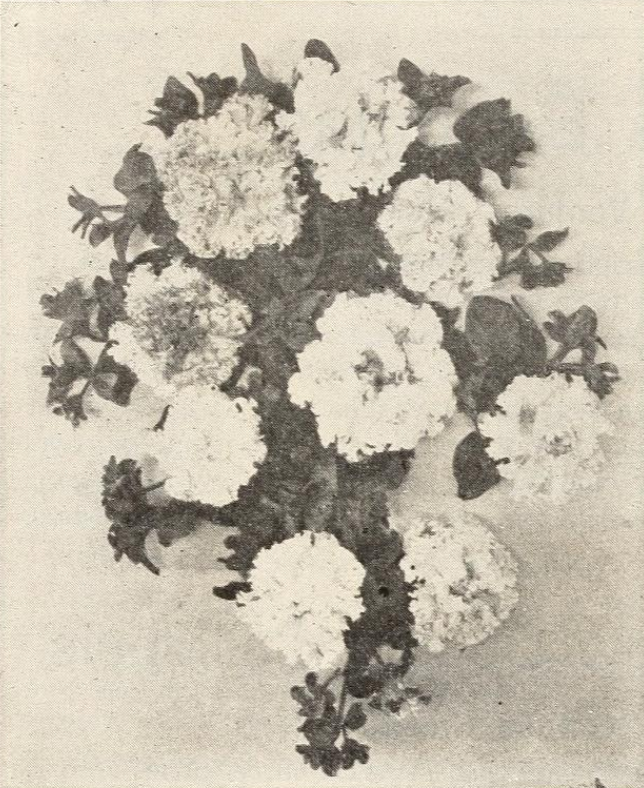
Mrs. Shepherd's 'Marvelous' Double Petunias

Described as having "a wizard's touch in the treatment of plants and flowers," Shepherd was the first woman in California to hybridize flowers and sell their seeds. At the time of her death, she was credited with being "the most noted woman in this line of work... not only in California but over all the country." In 1905, one writer enthused that she was "known to every floriculturist in civilization as a hybridizer of blossoms and originator of new flowers".

Shepherd collected seeds, plants, and rare flowers, and developed new varieties of flowers, including begonias, Coreopsis section Calliopsis, cosmos, nasturtiums, petunias, poppies, and a rose, 'Oriole.' She developed the 'Heavenly Blue' morning glory, and the 'Golden West' California Poppy. She also developed the first of the 'Superbissima' genotype of petunia, a variety called 'California Giant' which became the most frequently grown petunia of the 1930s.

The work of developing a new flower began with the identification of potentially interesting "sports" of a flower, each of which was carefully raised. Then, "When the flower goes to seed, she gathers the seeds, sows them, watches and tends the resulting plants till they fructify and in like manner gathers the seeds of this second generation and garners them for planting." In addition,"hybridizing is an intensely interesting part of Mrs. Shepherd's work. She carefully selects the flowers she wishes to cross, then takes upon the tip of a little camel hair brush some of the pollen of one flower and deposits it upon the pistil of the other flower." Such work involved "accurate, painstaking, patient and continuous labor".

Shepherd was encouraged to consider hybridizing as a business by nurseryman Peter Henderson of New York, around 1881. By 1884, she had formed the Theodosia B. Shepherd Company in Ventura, California. By 1892, she was cultivating 8 acres of gardens, which included a hedge of heliotrope 400 feet (120 m) long, and selling seeds nationally and internationally. The business published an annual retail catalogue as well as two lists for wholesalers. The company was incorporated in 1902. The seed and bulb business that Theodosia established is considered to be the foundation of California's seed industry.

In addition to growing and hybrizing flowers and running a company, Theodosia wrote and lectured about plants and flowers. She encouraged other women to make horticulture a profession by growing flowers and selling seeds. She was seen as an exemplar for women in the profession. Shepherd was favorably compared to Luther Burbank, a hybridizer of vegetables and fruits, and was sometimes called "The Female Burbank" or "The Pioneer Seed-grower". Her gardens were considered "to have put Ventura on the map". Visitors to her gardens included Susan B. Anthony, Julia Ward Howe, and Washington Atlee Burpee of Burpee Seeds.

"I sometimes think that we do not always choose our work, but are chosen, or called to it. It has always seemed to me that I was called into the field of flowers with a special mission for them: to grow and disseminate them, where they are loved; to write about them; to talk about them, and, most of all, to create new varieties."

== Later life ==
Theodosia Burr Shepherd died on September 6, 1906, in Ventura, California. She was cremated and interred in the Rosedale cemetery in Los Angeles. On December 7, 1907, William Edgar Shepherd married Theodosia's widowed sister Ella Hall Enderlein.

Theodosia's daughter Myrtle Shepherd Francis inherited her business. Like her mother, Francis specialized in breeding flowers, including self-seeding double petunias. Her second husband, Willard H. Francis, acted as manager.

In 1946, Myrtle Shepherd Francis wrote a biography of her mother, entitled Theodosia: The Flower Wizard of California. Manuscript copies were left in the archives of UCLA and UC Berkeley. An edited edition of the book was finally published on May 10, 2014.

Remnants of Theodosia's garden still remain in Ventura. She planted a banana plant and two strawberry trees which are now in the grounds of the E. P. Foster Library. The corner of Chestnut and Poli Streets, near where she lived, was designated a local historic landmark as of July 17, 1978. At that time, the only plants remaining from her garden were a Star Pine and a Bird of Paradise. There have been attempts to reclaim some of the areas that were once part of Shepherd's garden as community gardens.

Materials relating to Theodosia Burr Shepherd are located in the archives of the Charles E. Young Research Library at UCLA and the Bancroft library at UC Berkeley.

== Gallery ==
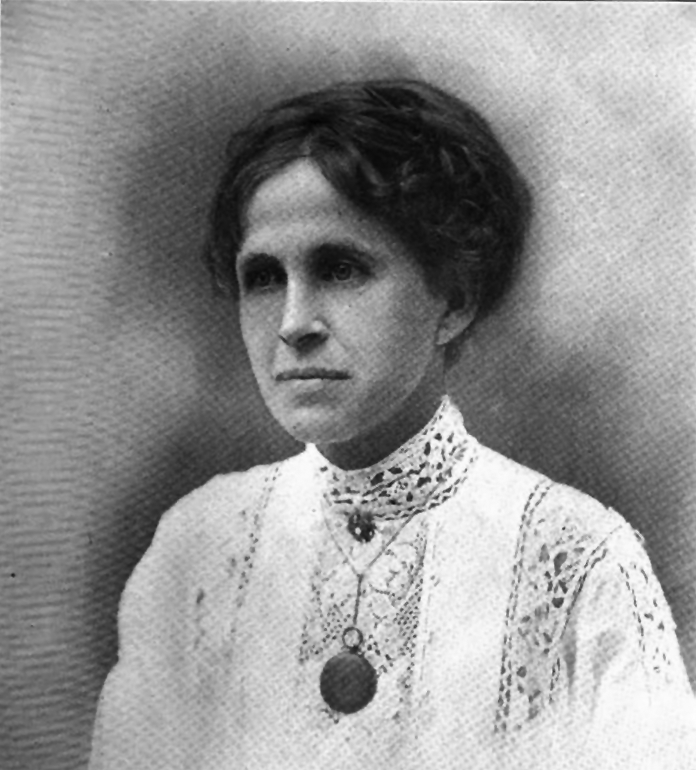
Myrtle Shepherd Francis, 1912

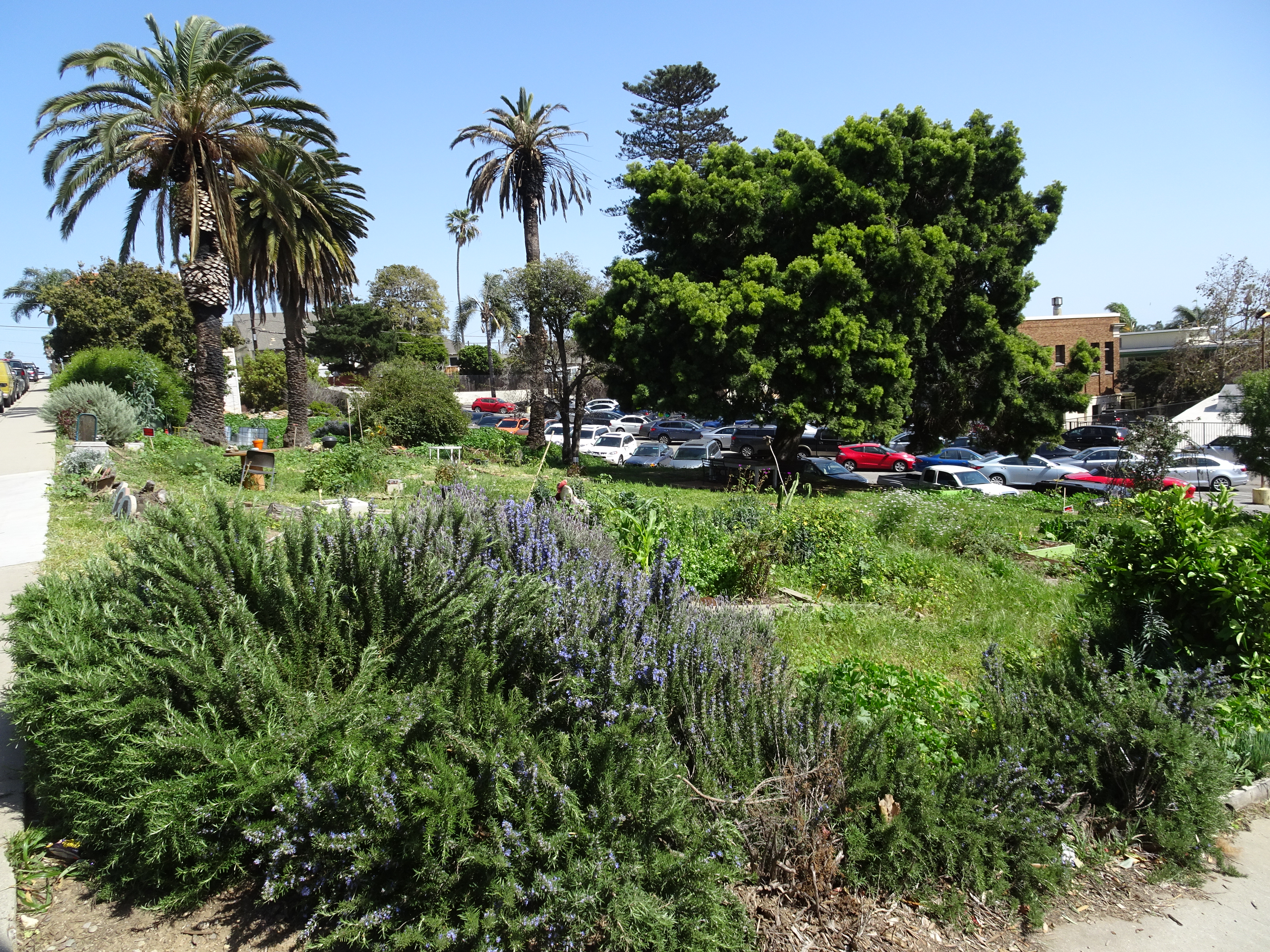
Shepherd's home in Ventura, California, now the corner of Chestnut and Poli Streets

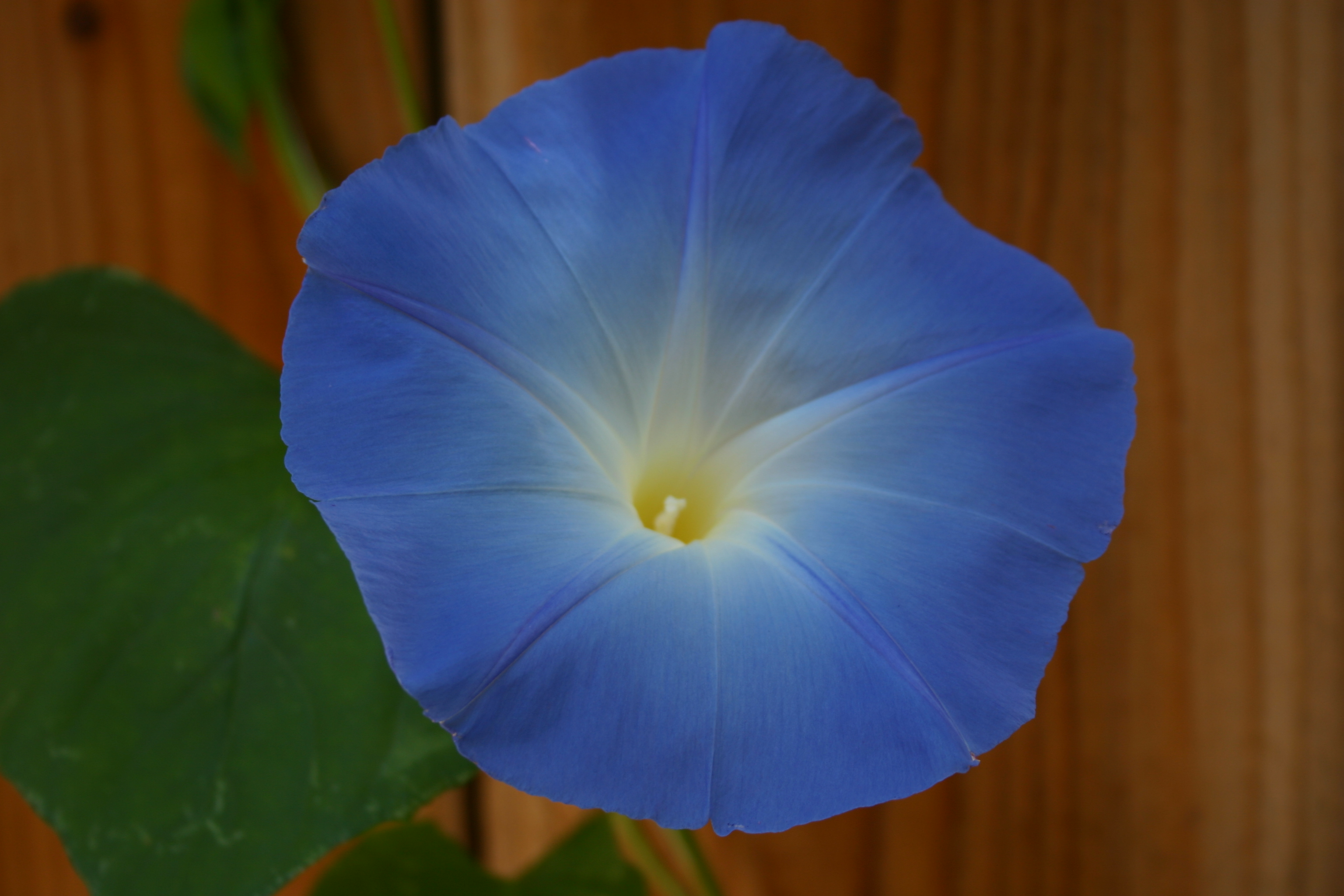
Heavenly Blue Morning Glory
