= Charles A. Kennedy =

American politician (1869–1951)

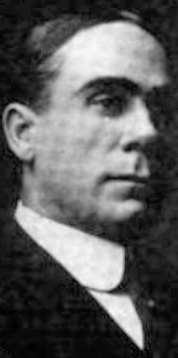

Member of the U.S. House of Representatives
- In office March 4, 1907 – March 3, 1921
- Constituency: Iowa's 1st district

Member of the Iowa House of Representatives
- In office 1902–1904

Personal details
- Born: Charles Augustus Kennedy; March 24, 1869 Montrose, Iowa
- Died: January 10, 1951 (aged 81) Montrose, Iowa
- Party: Republican
- Occupation: Politician

Charles Augustus Kennedy (March 24, 1869 – January 10, 1951) was a seven-term Republican U.S. Representative from Iowa's 1st congressional district in southeastern Iowa.

== Biography ==
Born in Montrose, Iowa, Kennedy completed preparatory studies. He was interested in horticultural pursuits and later engaged in business as a nurseryman. He served as mayor of Montrose from 1890 to 1895. He served as member of the Iowa House of Representatives for one two-year term between 1903 and 1905.

In 1906, Kennedy was elected as a Republican to the Sixtieth Congress. At the time of his nomination, his political philosophy was described as "strongly standpat," a reference to the "stand-patters" faction of the Republican Party that provided a conservative alternative to the Party's progressive wing. He was re-elected six times, before choosing not to run for re-election in 1920. He served as chairman of the Committee on Mileage (in the Sixtieth and Sixty-first Congresses), and the Committee on Rivers and Harbors (in the Sixty-sixth Congress). In all, he served from March 4, 1907 to March 3, 1921.

He engaged in banking until his retirement. He died in Montrose on January 10, 1951. He was interred in Montrose Cemetery.

U.S. House of Representatives
Preceded by Thomas Hedge	Member of the U.S. House of Representatives from Iowa's 1st congressional district 1907–1921	Succeeded by William F. Kopp
