= Edward Mezvinsky =

American politician and convicted felon

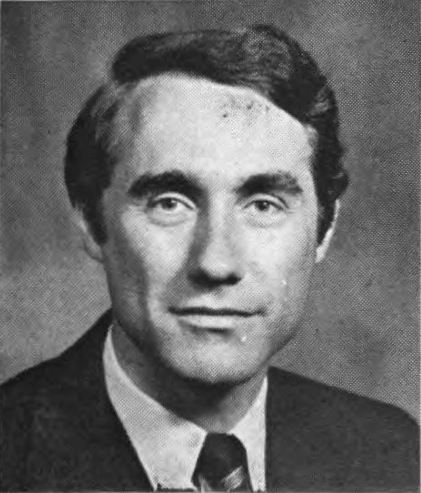

Chair of the Pennsylvania Democratic Party
- In office August 13, 1981 – June 28, 1986
- Preceded by: Alex Debreczeni
- Succeeded by: Harris Wofford

United States Ambassador to the United Nations Commission on Human Rights
- In office 1977–1979
- President: Jimmy Carter
- Preceded by: Allard K. Lowenstein
- Succeeded by: Jerome J. Shestack

Member of the U.S. House of Representatives from Iowa's 1st district
- In office January 3, 1973 – January 3, 1977
- Preceded by: Fred Schwengel
- Succeeded by: Jim Leach

Member of the Iowa House of Representatives from the 41st district
- In office January 13, 1969 – January 10, 1971
- Preceded by: Multi-member district
- Succeeded by: Emil Husak

Personal details
- Born: Edward Maurice Mezvinsky; January 17, 1937 (age 89) Ames, Iowa, U.S.
- Party: Democratic
- Spouse(s): Myra Shulman (m. 1963; div. 1974) Marjorie Margolies (m. 1975; div. 2007)
- Children: 11, including Marc
- Relatives: Norton Mezvinsky (brother); Chelsea Clinton (daughter-in-law)
- Education: University of Iowa (BA); University of California, Berkeley (MA); University of California, Hastings (JD)
- Criminal information
- Status: Released, probation expired
- Convictions: Bank fraud, mail fraud and wire fraud
- Penalty: 5 years imprisonment

Edward Maurice Mezvinsky (/mɛzˈvɪnski/; born January 17, 1937) is an American politician and lawyer from Iowa. Mezvinsky is a former U.S. representative and felon. A member of the Democratic Party, he represented Iowa's 1st congressional district in the U.S. House of Representatives for two terms (1973–77).

Mezvinsky grew up in Ames, Iowa, and played high school football there. He graduated from the University of California, Hastings College of the Law (1965). After being elected to the Iowa Legislature (1968), he lost a race for Congress in 1970, then won in 1972 and was re-elected in 1974. He made several unsuccessful U.S. Senate attempts in the 1980s. In 2001, he was convicted of 31 charges of felony fraud, and served five years in federal prison.

In 2010, he became father-in-law to Chelsea Clinton, the daughter of former U.S. President Bill and former U.S. Secretary of State Hillary Clinton.

== Life and career ==
Mezvinsky grew up in Ames, Iowa, the son of Jewish immigrants from the Russian Empire. His father, Abram, was a grocery store owner from Kyiv and his mother, Feiga "Fanny" Grundman, from a shtetl called Lashanovka in Volhynia (now Ukraine). He was an all-state football end and member of the Ames High School state championship basketball and track teams of 1955.

Mezvinsky attended the University of Iowa, graduating in 1960. He went on to earn a master's degree in political science from the University of California, Berkeley in 1963, and a J.D. from the University of California, Hastings College of the Law in 1965. He returned briefly to Iowa to practice law, but quickly began a political career. In 1965, he worked for former Rep. Neal Smith in Washington on lobbyist disclosure and ethics bills. He was elected to the Iowa Legislature in 1968, where he attracted publicity as a consumers' advocate. He lost a 1970 campaign to unseat Republican Congressman Fred Schwengel in Iowa's 1st congressional district by only 765 votes (out of over 120,000 cast). After reapportionment improved his chances, Mezvinsky won a 1972 rematch.

During his first term in Congress, he sat on the House Judiciary Committee and voted for the impeachment of President Richard Nixon for his activities in the Watergate scandal. He was one of eight Democratic members of the committee who voted for all five articles of impeachment drafted against Nixon; three were reported to the House, while two failed.

Although Mezvinsky defeated Davenport businessman Jim Leach in 1974 in the immediate aftermath of the impeachment hearings, Leach defeated him two years later, in 1976. Six months into his first term in Congress, Mezvinsky separated from his wife of ten years Myra Shulman; they were divorced two weeks after his 1974 re-election. During his final term he married Marjorie Margolies, a television journalist. After his 1976 defeat, they relocated to suburban Philadelphia. After serving in Congress, Mezvinsky was United States Ambassador to the United Nations Commission on Human Rights from 1977 to 1979.

Mezvinsky unsuccessfully sought the Democratic nomination for the United States Senate seat held by retiring incumbent Republican Richard Schweiker in 1980, but lost to former Pittsburgh Mayor Pete Flaherty. Flaherty went on to lose the general election by a narrow margin to Republican (later Democrat) Arlen Specter.

Mezvinsky became chairman of the Pennsylvania Democratic Party, and made a run for state attorney general in 1988. He won the Democratic primary, but lost to Republican Ernie Preate in the general election. He also unsuccessfully sought the Democratic nomination for lieutenant governor in 1990, losing to incumbent Mark Singel.

== Criminal activities ==
In March 2001, Mezvinsky was indicted and later pleaded guilty to 31 of 69 felony charges of bank fraud, mail fraud, and wire fraud. Mezvinsky, who had been working as an attorney at the time, was funneling embezzled and fraudulently obtained money to West African con men after falling victim to an online advance-fee scam. In the waning days of the Clinton presidency, before the indictment was handed down, Mezvinsky's wife wrote personally to President Clinton requesting a pardon for her husband. Clinton declined. Nearly $10 million was involved in the crimes. Shortly after Mezvinsky's indictment, he was diagnosed with bipolar disorder, but the judge at his trial disallowed a mental illness defense.

He entered prison in February 2003, and served his time at Federal Prison Camp, Eglin. Mezvinsky, Federal Bureau of Prisons # 55040–066, was released in April 2008, after 5 years. He remained on federal probation until 2011, and as of 2010 still owed $9.4 million in restitution to his victims.

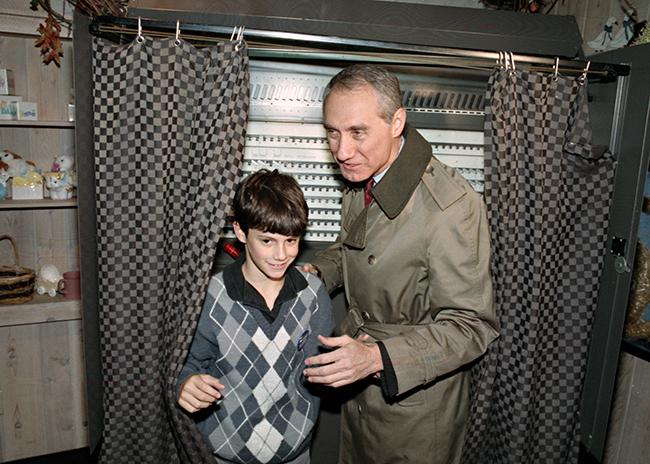
Edward Mezvinsky with his son Marc Mezvinsky in 1988

== Family ==
From 1993 to 1995, Mezvinsky's wife Marjorie Margolies served a term in Congress. Together, they raised eleven children, three of whom were adopted and four others of whom were from his first marriage to Myra Shulman. In 1998, she was the Democratic nominee for lieutenant governor of Pennsylvania. In 2000, she was running for the Democratic nomination for the U.S. Senate when her husband's business problems forced them to file for bankruptcy and forced her abrupt withdrawal. They divorced several years later.

=== Friendship with the Clintons ===
During the Clinton administration in the 1990s, Mezvinsky and his wife Marjorie Margolies-Mezvinsky became close to U.S. President Bill Clinton and Hillary Clinton, and were frequent guests at White House state dinners. The two families had met when they attended the annual Renaissance Weekend gathering in South Carolina. President Clinton was reportedly indebted to Margolies-Mezvinsky for providing the crucial vote in the House of Representatives to pass his budget and tax bill in 1993, despite being, as Clinton noted in his autobiography, "one of the very few Democrats who represented a district with more constituents who'd get tax hikes than tax cuts, and in her campaign she'd promised not to vote for any tax increases"; she subsequently lost her bid for re-election in 1994.

In 2010 Mezvinsky's son, Marc Mezvinsky, married Chelsea Clinton, daughter of Bill and Hillary.

== See also ==
- List of Jewish members of the United States Congress

U.S. House of Representatives
Preceded by Fred Schwengel	Member of the U.S. House of Representatives from Iowa's 1st congressional district 1973–1977	Succeeded by Jim Leach
Party political offices
Preceded by Alex Debreczeni	Chair of the Pennsylvania Democratic Party; 1981–1986	Succeeded by Harris Wofford
Preceded by Allen Ertel	Democratic nominee for Attorney General of Pennsylvania; 1988	Succeeded by Joe Kohn
U.S. order of precedence (ceremonial)
Preceded by Tony Gonzales as Former U.S. Representative	Order of precedence of the United States as Former U.S. Representative	Succeeded by Mike Blouin as Former U.S. Representative
