= William Thompson (Iowa politician) =

American politician

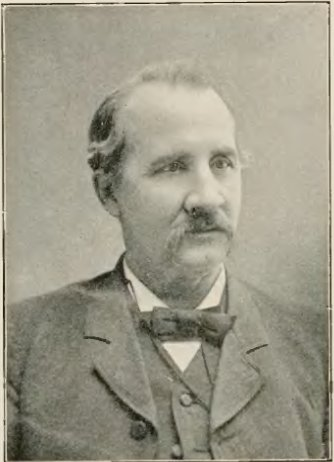

Member of the U.S. House of Representatives from Iowa's 1st district
- In office March 4, 1847 – June 29, 1850
- Preceded by: At-large Representatives Serranus Clinton Hastings and Shepherd Leffler
- Succeeded by: Daniel F. Miller

Personal details
- Born: November 10, 1813 Fayette County, Pennsylvania, US
- Died: October 6, 1897 (aged 84) Tacoma, Washington, US
- Party: Democratic
- Profession: Lawyer, clerk, newspaperman, longtime Army officer

William Thompson (November 10, 1813 – October 6, 1897), a lawyer, clerk, newspaperman, longtime Army officer, and, was the first person elected to Congress from Iowa's 1st congressional district. His race for re-election in 1848 was the only Iowa U.S. House election to be revoted. After Thompson's opponent, Whig candidate Daniel F. Miller, challenged Thompson's apparent victory, Congress ordered his seat vacated and a special election conducted, which Thompson lost. He was a cavalry officer in the Union Army during the Civil War, and in the regular army for ten years thereafter.

Thompson was born in Fayette County, Pennsylvania, where he attended the common schools. He assisted his father to clear a farm in the dense forests of Ohio, and when twenty-one began to study law in the office of Columbus Delano. In 1839 he went by steamboat down the Ohio River and up the Mississippi River to Montrose in what was then Iowa Territory, before settling in what is now Mount Pleasant, Iowa. In 1843, he was a member of the Iowa Territory House of Representatives. He served as chief clerk of the two succeeding sessions, and became secretary of the 1846 Iowa state constitutional convention.

Iowa was admitted to the union effective December 1846, and given two seats in the U.S. House. The First Iowa General Assembly established the boundaries of those districts in February 1847, and set elections for August 2, 1847 to name their representatives in the Thirtieth Congress (from December 1847 to March 1849). Thompson, running as a Democrat, defeated Whig Party candidate J.B. Browne by 544 votes. The legality of Iowa's 1847 congressional elections was questioned because Iowa Governor Ansel Briggs never signed the law authorizing the elections, but the U.S. House nevertheless seated the winners.

In 1848, Thompson was renominated, and ran in the August general election against Whig Party member Daniel F. Miller. Thompson was certified as the winner by the Iowa Secretary of State, and upon presenting his credentials to the U.S. House was initially allowed to continue representing his district. In the Thirty-first Congress, Thompson served as chairman of the House Committee on Expenditures in the Post Office Department. However, in response to a challenge filed by Miller alleging that Thompson's law partner stole the poll book for Kanesville (now Council Bluffs), and Democrats' claim that Whigs had bought votes of Mormons in Kanesville, the House declared Thompson's seat vacant on June 29, 1850. The special election was a rematch of the 1848 election, but the second time, Miller defeated Thompson. In all, Thompson served in Congress from December 1847 to June 29, 1850.

For several years he was editor of the Iowa State Gazette. He was elected chief clerk of the Iowa House of Representatives in 1861, by a unanimous vote. On July 31, 1861, after the outbreak of the Civil War, Thompson was commissioned as a captain in Company E of the 1st Regiment Iowa Volunteer Cavalry. On May 18, 1863, he was promoted to major, and on June 20, 1864, to colonel. On March 13, 1865, as the end of the war approached, he became a brevetted brigadier general of the Volunteers.

When the Civil War ended, Thompson's military service did not. On July 28, 1866, at the request of General George Custer, he was recommissioned as a captain in the 7th Cavalry Regiment of the regular army, and fought in the Indian Wars. He remained with the Army until his retirement on December 15, 1875, just a few months before Custer and most of the 7th Cavalry was massacred at the Battle of Little Big Horn.

Thompson died in Tacoma, Washington and was buried there.

U.S. House of Representatives
Preceded by District created	Member of the U.S. House of Representatives from Iowa's 1st congressional district March 3, 1847 – June 29, 1850	Succeeded by Daniel F. Miller
