= Daniel F. Miller =

American politician

Daniel Fry Miller
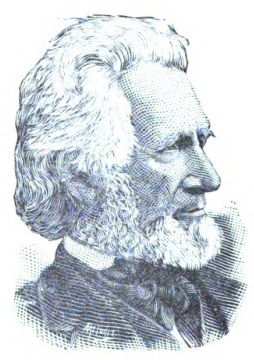
- From 1894's Poets and Poetry of Iowa

Member of the U.S. House of Representatives from Iowa's 1st district
- In office December 20, 1850 – March 3, 1851
- Preceded by: William Thompson
- Succeeded by: Bernhart Henn

Personal details
- Born: October 4, 1814 Cumberland, Maryland, U.S.
- Died: December 9, 1895 (aged 81) Omaha, Nebraska, U.S.
- Resting place: Oakland Cemetery, Keokuk, Iowa, U.S.
- Party: Whig

Daniel Fry Miller (October 4, 1814 – December 9, 1895), a pioneer lawyer, was briefly a U.S. Representative from Iowa's 1st congressional district. He is the only person in Iowa history to successfully nullify a congressional election (and thereby force a re-vote, which he won but with little time left in the term).

Born in Cumberland, Maryland, Miller moved with his parents to Wayne County, Ohio, in 1816. After attending the public schools, he taught for several years. Next, he engaged in newspaper work in Wooster, Ohio. In 1830, he moved to Pittsburgh, Pennsylvania, where he was employed as a clerk in stores. After studying law, he was admitted to the bar in 1839 and commenced practice in what is now Fort Madison, Iowa, then in Iowa Territory. In 1840, he served as member of Iowa's territorial house of representatives.

In 1848, the Whig Party nominated Miller to run against incumbent Democratic Congressman William H. Thompson. Thompson was declared the winner by the state's election canvassers, but Miller accused Thompson of absconding with the voting rolls from the election. The U.S. House resolved the contest over two years after it occurred, by deciding that neither Thompson nor Miller was entitled to the seat. That decision forced a special election, which Miller won. Thus, from December 20, 1850, to March 3, 1851, he was the First District's duly elected member of the Thirty-first Congress.

Following his brief service in Washington, he resumed the practice of law. In 1856 he served as presidential elector on the Republican ticket. Because Republican frontiersman John C. Fremont had carried Iowa, Miller became an official elector and his vote for Fremont was counted in the electoral college. He served as mayor of Fort Madison in 1859, before moving to nearby Keokuk, Iowa, where he continued the practice of law. He was an unsuccessful candidate for election as judge of the Iowa Supreme Court in 1860, losing to George G. Wright, who would serve an additional ten years on the Court and eventually serve one full term in the U.S. Senate.

Miller was elected mayor of Keokuk, in 1873. He served as a Democratic member of the Iowa House of Representatives in 1894. He retired from active practice in 1895 and moved to Omaha, Nebraska, where he died on December 9, 1895. He was interred in Oakland Cemetery, in Keokuk.

U.S. House of Representatives
Preceded by William Thompson	Member of the U.S. House of Representatives from Iowa's 1st congressional district 1850–1851	Succeeded by Bernhart Henn
