= David Hartsuch =

American politician

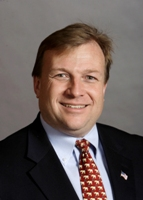

Member of the Iowa Senate from the 41st district
- In office January 8, 2007 – January 2011
- Preceded by: Maggie Tinsman

Personal details
- Party: Republican
- Website: Hartsuch's website

David Hartsuch was the Iowa State Senator from the 41st District. He served in the Iowa Senate from 2007 to 2011.

Hartsuch is an emergency department physician. He has a bachelor's degree from Northern Illinois University and a medical degree from the University of Minnesota.

Hartsuch served on several committees in the Iowa Senate – the Human Resources committee; the Judiciary committee; the Local Government committee; and the Veterans Affairs committee. He also serves on the Administration and Regulation Appropriations Subcommittee.

Hartsuch was elected in 2006 with 11,572 votes, defeating Democratic opponent Phyllis Thede by approximately 400 votes.

Hartsuch was the Republican nominee for the U.S. House of Representatives in Iowa's 1st congressional district and lost to challenger Bruce Braley in 2008.

In 2010, Hartsuch was challenged in the Republican primary by Roby Smith. On June 8, Hartsuch was defeated by under 200 votes.

In 2021, a letter from Hartsuch was published in the Quad City Times, leading some to question his rationality.

== Electoral history ==
Year	Party	Incumbent	Status	Party	Candidate	Votes	%
2008	Democratic	Bruce Braley	re-elected	Democratic	Bruce Braley	178,229	65%
2008	Democratic	Bruce Braley	re-elected	Republican	David Hartsuch	99,447	35%

Iowa Senate
Preceded by Maggie Tinsman	41st District; 2007–present	Succeeded by Roby Smith
