= Carol Browner =

American environmentalist and lawyer (born 1955)

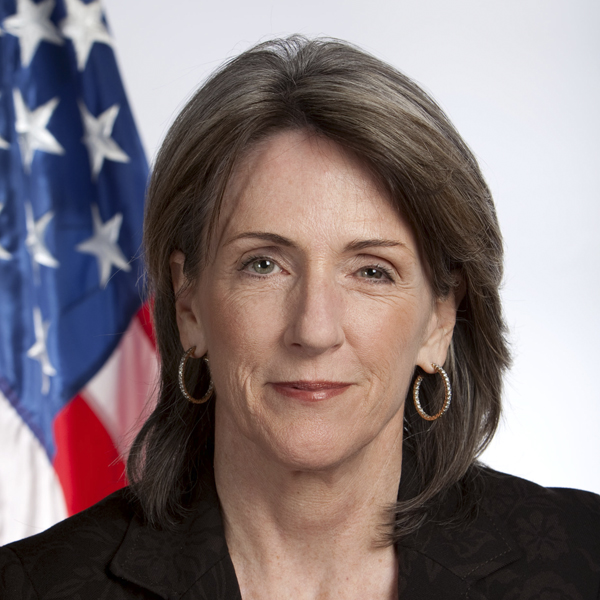
- Official portrait, 2010

Director of the Office of Energy and Climate Change Policy
- In office January 22, 2009 – March 3, 2011
- President: Barack Obama
- Deputy: Heather Zichal
- Preceded by: Office established
- Succeeded by: Office abolished

8th Administrator of the Environmental Protection Agency
- In office January 31, 1993 – January 20, 2001
- President: Bill Clinton
- Preceded by: W. Michael McCabe (acting)
- Succeeded by: W. Michael McCabe (acting)

Personal details
- Born: Carol Martha Browner; December 16, 1955 (age 70) Miami, Florida, U.S.
- Party: Democratic
- Spouses: Michael Podhorzer (divorced); Thomas Downey (m. 2007)
- Education: University of Florida (BA, JD)

Carol Martha Browner (born December 16, 1955) is an American lawyer, environmentalist, and businesswoman who served as director of the White House Office of Energy and Climate Change Policy in the Obama administration from 2009 to 2011. Browner previously served as Administrator of the Environmental Protection Agency (EPA) during the Clinton administration from 1993 to 2001. She currently works as a Senior Counselor at Albright Stonebridge Group, a global business strategy firm.

Browner grew up in Florida and graduated from the University of Florida and the University of Florida College of Law. After working for the Florida House of Representatives, she was employed by Citizen Action in Washington, D.C. She became a legislative assistant for Senators Lawton Chiles and Al Gore. Browner then headed the Florida Department of Environmental Regulation from 1991 to 1993, where she turned it into one of the most active departments in the state government.

She was the longest-serving administrator in the history of the EPA, staying through both terms of the Clinton presidency. During her tenure, she reorganized the agency's enforcement structure and oversaw two new programs designed to create flexible partnerships with industry as an alternative to traditional regulation. She started a successful program to deal with contaminated lands in urban areas. She took the lead within the administration in defending existing environmental laws and budgets and was the driving force behind a stringent tightening of air quality standards that led to a prolonged political and legal battle.

Afterward, Browner became a founding member of the Albright Group and Albright Capital Management in 2001. She also served on a number of boards of directors and committees dealing with environmental issues. Her director role in the Obama administration was sometimes informally referred to as the "Energy Czar" or "Climate Czar". Her efforts towards getting comprehensive climate and energy legislation passed in Congress came to no avail, but she assumed a prominent role in the federal government's response to the BP Deepwater Horizon oil spill during 2010. She left her position in 2011 and the job itself was abolished shortly thereafter. Following that she rejoined the merged Albright Stonebridge Group, continued being active in several boards of environmental organizations, joined the boards of some energy- and agriculture-related companies, and became an advocate for nuclear energy in response to the dangers of global warming.

== Early life and education ==
Born in Miami, Florida, on December 16, 1955, Browner is the daughter of Isabella Harty-Hugues and Michael Browner, both of whom were professors at Miami Dade Community College, in social science and English respectively. She has two younger sisters. Browner grew up in South Miami, and her hikes in the nearby Everglades – only a bicycle ride away from her house – gave her a close connection to the natural world: "I was very shaped by growing up in that kind of environment where nature was right there."

Browner received her B.A. degree from the University of Florida in 1977, majoring in English. She then graduated from the University of Florida College of Law with a J.D. degree in 1979.

== Early career ==
During 1980 and 1981, Browner worked as General Counsel for the Florida House of Representatives Committee on Government Operations. There she helped revise Florida's Conservation and Recreational Lands Program. In 1983, she moved to Washington, D.C. and worked as associate director for the national Citizen Action group, a grassroots lobbying organization that was active in environmental issues.

Browner met Michael Podhorzer, a specialist in health-care issues at Citizen Action, in 1983. They married in 1987 and lived in Takoma Park, Maryland. They have a son, Zachary, born in 1987.

Between 1986 and 1988, Browner served as chief legislative assistant to Democratic U.S. Senator Lawton Chiles from Florida. In that role, she worked on a complex negotiation to expand Florida's Big Cypress National Preserve as well as on a ban on offshore drilling nearby the Florida Keys. During 1989, she served as a legal counsel for the Senate Committee on Energy and Natural Resources. She was not averse to in-field investigation, and once dived in coastal waters to do research while pregnant.

From 1988 to 1991, Browner worked as legislative director for Senator Al Gore, and became known as a Gore protégé. She helped prepare amendments to the Clean Air Act and managed Gore's legislative staff.

== Secretary of Environmental Regulation for Florida ==
As Secretary of Environmental Regulation, Browner headed the Florida Department of Environmental Regulation from 1991 to 1993, while living in Tallahassee. It was the nation's third-largest such state agency, with 1,500 employees and a budget of some $650 million. There she believed that economic development and environmental protection did not have to be in conflict with each other. She revitalized the demoralized department and turned it into one of the most active in the Florida state government. She shortened the amount of time it took the department to review development permits for wetlands-affected areas and for manufacturing plants; in doing so, she annoyed some environmentalists who thought that the streamlined procedures diminished public review.

Browner pushed for the halting of construction of new hazardous waste plants and municipal waste incinerators, on the grounds that health and environmental consequences were insufficiently known. She brokered a deal with Walt Disney World that would allow it to build on wetlands it owned, in exchange for $40 million of work by Disney to restore endangered wetlands nearby. She pleased environmentalists by persuading Chiles, who had become governor, to negotiate a settlement to a federal lawsuit regarding damage to Everglades National Park and forcing the Florida sugar industry to bear much of the $1 billion cost. The head of Florida's largest business trade association described dealing with Browner: "She kicks the door open, throws in a hand grenade, and then walks in to shoot who's left. She really doesn't like to compromise. [But she] has done a pretty good job down here. People have more complaints with the way she does it than what she does."

== EPA Administrator ==
=== Nomination and confirmation ===
After the 1992 presidential election, Browner served as transition director for Vice President-elect Gore. President-elect Bill Clinton announced her as his choice for Environmental Protection Agency head on December 11, 1992. While both Clinton and Gore had criticized the George H. W. Bush administration's commitment to environmental protection during the campaign, the selection of Browner – who was described by The Washington Post as having "the mind and training of an attorney-legislator but the soul of an activist" – was seen as an indication that Gore's ardent environmentalism had won out over Clinton's more pro-business mindset. Clinton later wrote that he had not known her, but that Chiles had recommended her highly and Gore had requested she be named. The pick, along with several others of Gore protégés that Clinton made, helped solidify the vice president's position within the administration. At her confirmation hearings before the United States Senate Committee on Environment and Public Works, Browner came across as pragmatic and allayed fears that she would be excessively influenced by or tied to Gore. She was confirmed by the unanimous consent of the United States Senate on January 21, 1993.

She and Podhorzer returned to Takoma Park, Maryland, and he continued to work at Citizen Action. Her long-term goal was "to leave the world a slightly better place", and she practiced various environmentally beneficial practices at home. She avoided the Nannygate problems of some of Clinton's other early female nominees by having never used a nanny. She continued to lead an active outdoor life via bicycling, skiing, and jogging.

=== First four years ===
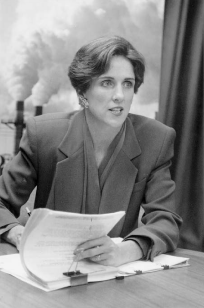
Carol Browner as EPA Administrator

At the EPA, Browner supervised some 17,000 employees and a $7 billion budget. Early in her administration, she angered some EPA employees by publicly stating that the organization lacked management accountability and discipline and was wasting taxpayer money. Soon after taking office, Browner and her top aides, including assistant administrator for enforcement Steven Herman, reorganized several awkward and inefficient agency enforcement structures into a single Office of Enforcement and Compliance Assurance. The EPA's regional offices were permitted flexibility in reworking their own enforcement structures, however, which led to some bureaucratic conflicts.

Browner found criticism from both sides of environmental issues and battled many environmentalists, who objected to her support for repeal of the 1958 Delaney clause regarding permissible levels of carcinogens in foods. Her announcement in May 1993 that the EPA would impose a moratorium on new incinerator and industrial furnace licensing drew support from environmentalists, however. A move by Clinton to elevate the EPA and Browner to Cabinet-level status failed in late 1993 to gain sufficient Congressional support. Many of her legislative desires had to take a back seat to the higher-priority 1993 Clinton health care plan.

When the Republican Party took control of Congress after the 1994 U.S. elections, Browner took the lead for the Clinton administration in successfully fighting efforts by the Republicans, especially in the House of Representatives, to amend the Clean Water Act and to roll back other environmental regulations. She was able to work in a bipartisan manner, though, with Republicans in helping craft amendments to the Safe Drinking Water Act and passage of the Food Quality Protection Act. During the budget-cutting negotiations surrounding the federal government shutdown in 1995, Browner successfully protected the EPA's review and enforcement powers and managed to gain over $750 million in increased spending for the agency. Her bureaucratic effectiveness illustrated what one of her top aides characterized as her talent: "an extreme focus on a single issue where she is completely certain that she is right".

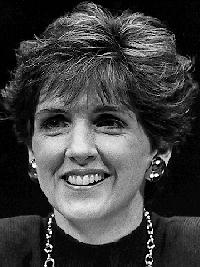
Carol Browner, c. 1996

Two initiatives begun by the Clinton administration under Browner's tenure were part of its "reinventing government" program and sought to realize the notion of environmental contracts as a way of expanding the EPA's flexible public-private partnerships, as an alternative to traditional regulation. Project XL in 1995 was designed to find common sense, cost-effective solutions to environmental issues at individual facilities, while the Common Sense Initiative in 1994 was targeted at efforts involving entire industry sectors, rather than dealing with issues on a crisis-by-crisis, pollutant-by-pollutant basis. Project XL had mixed results, with some success stories but an uncertain legal basis regarding enforcement and less active participation than envisioned. The more ambitious Common Sense Initiative, which somewhat resembled the environmental covenants appearing in some European countries and also incorporated the viewpoints of environmental justice, showed limitations in some areas but successes in the printing and metal finishing and plating industries before being concluded in 1998.

In March 1995, Browner and the EPA were charged by the House Government Reform and Oversight Subcommittee on Regulatory Affairs with violating the federal Anti-Lobbying Act (18 U.S. Code § 1913) by faxing unsolicited material opposing the Republican-sponsored regulatory reform package to various corporations and public-interest groups. Browner denied the accusation, saying the charge was an attempt to keep her from debating a possible rollback of health and environmental protections.

As EPA Administrator, Browner started the agency's successful Brownfields Program in 1995. The program helped facilitate cleanups of brownfield lands and their contaminated facilities, especially in urban areas, by empowering states, communities, and assorted stakeholders in economic development. It leveraged more than $1 billion in public and private funds for cleanups and created thousands of new jobs, while enabling hundreds of communities to bring idle properties back into productive use.

=== Second four years ===
Perhaps Browner's biggest triumph came in 1997, when she convinced Clinton to support a stringent tightening of the Clean Air Act's National Ambient Air Quality Standards regarding permissible levels of the ground-level ozone that makes up smog and the fine airborne particulate matter that makes up soot. The decision came after months of public review of the proposed new standards that became the most divisive environmental debate of the decade. There was a long and fierce internal discussion within the administration, with opposition from the president's economic advisers echoing strong objections from some industry groups who said the costs of the new standards would far outweigh any benefits and that Browner had exaggerated the degree of certainty behind the EPA's scientific reviews on the matter. Over eighty environmental and health groups, who had grown quite frustrated with the administration's preference for minimal-cost incremental actions in the area, pressured Vice President Gore to take a stand on the matter, but he remained silent. Browner's adamant defense in favor of the new standards was conducted almost single-handedly, in private meetings, Congressional testimony, and public debate, and had come in the face of a silence from the White House that had put at risk her standing within the administration. Some within the administration objected to her unwillingness to modify her stance and even suggested she be fired for insubordination. Ultimately, Gore lent behind-the-scenes support in favor of the new regulations, which was a key factor in Clinton's final decision in Browner's favor. Overall, The New York Times termed Browner's actions "a remarkable piece of bureaucratic bravura" and Time magazine labelled Browner the "Queen of Clean Air". As the decision was announced, one which would affect hundreds of American cities and towns, Browner said: "These new standards will provide new health protections to 125 million Americans, including 35 million children."

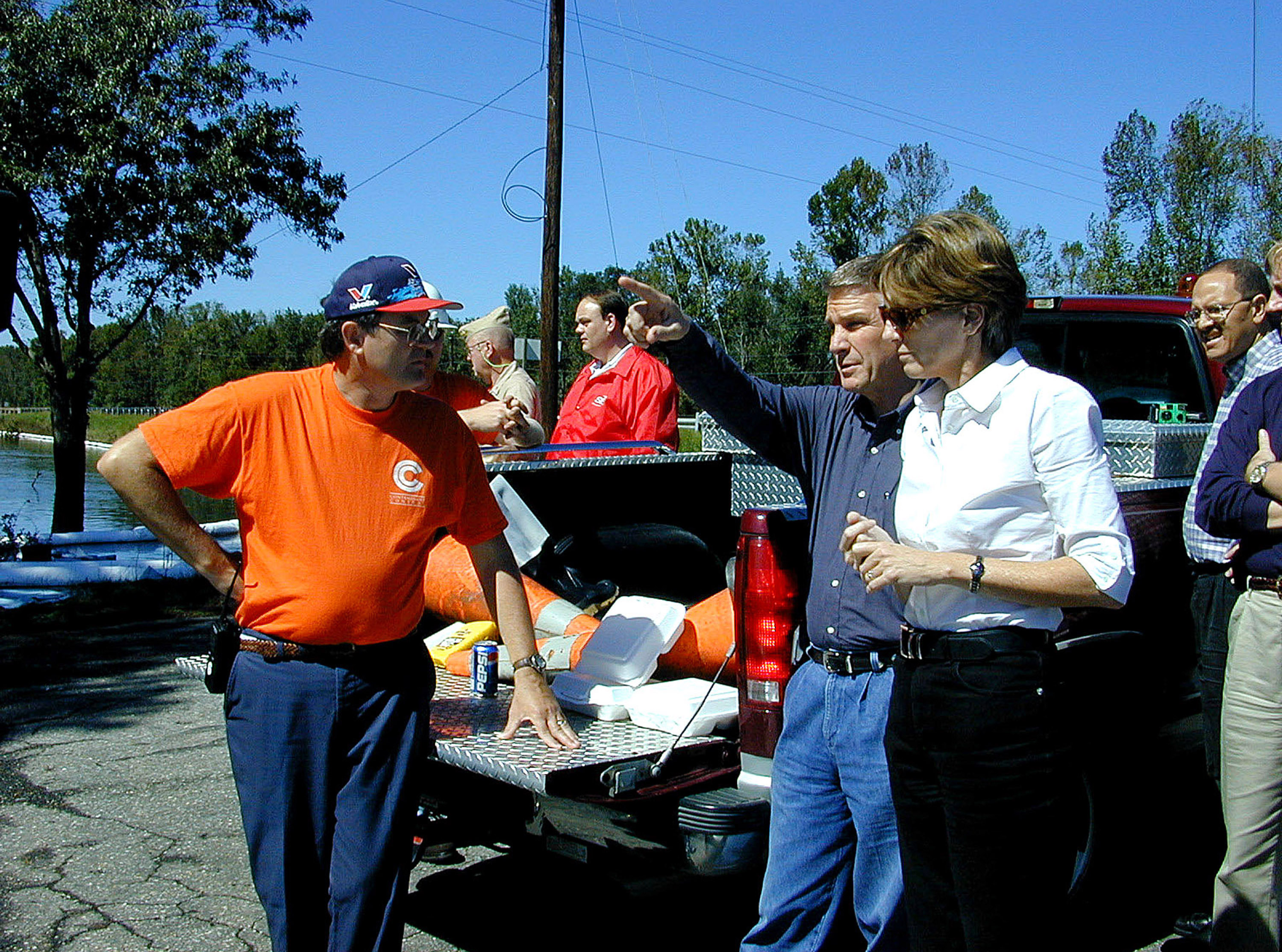
FEMA head James Lee Witt and Administrator Browner worked with a HazMat team in Kinston, North Carolina during September 1999, in the wake of severe flooding from Hurricane Floyd.

The change to the standards had to survive Congressional review, but the support of Republicans from the northeast, especially New York Senator Al D'Amato, helped compensate for Democrats opposed to them. The new regulations were challenged in the courts by industry groups as a violation of the U.S. Constitution's nondelegation principle and eventually landed in the U.S. Supreme Court, whose 2001 unanimous ruling in the case now titled Whitman v. American Trucking Associations, Inc. largely upheld Browner's and the EPA's actions. Browner and the EPA also took action against air pollution caused by motor vehicles, issuing standards in 1999 that for the first time included light trucks and sport utility vehicles to meet the same emission standards as cars, and that would require the sulfur content of gasoline to be reduced by 90 percent over five years.

During her tenure, Browner also began efforts to deal with global warming, giving the EPA authority to regulate carbon emissions causing climate change, although the EPA under the following George W. Bush administration chose not to use that authority. Several other policies of hers were reversed in the Bush administration as well.

During Browner's tenure, there were many reports from African American employees of racism directed at them from a network of "good old boys" who dominated the agency's middle management. The most known of these reports involved policy specialist Marsha Coleman-Adebayo, who in 1997 filed suit against the agency; in 2000, the court found the EPA guilty of discrimination against Coleman-Adebayo, and awarded her $300,000. Coleman-Adebayo said that Browner allowed the problems to persist rather than trying to clean them up. In an October 2000 Congressional hearing on the matter, Browner emphasized that minorities had tripled in number in the agency's senior rank during her time as administrator, but was unable to explain why the culprits in Coleman-Adebayo's case had not been dismissed and in some cases had been promoted. Congressional dissatisfaction with the situation and the EPA's treatment of Coleman-Adebayo led to passage of the No-FEAR Act in 2002, which prohibits federal managers and supervisors from engaging in unlawful discrimination and retaliation.

In the final days of the Clinton administration, D.C. District Judge Royce C. Lamberth ordered the EPA to preserve under the Freedom of Information Act all documents possibly relevant to last-minute EPA regulation issuances. In 2003, Lamberth found the EPA in contempt for not having preserved Browner's files, but did not find Browner or other officials in contempt. Browner had said that she had not been aware of the court order and that the computer material she had removed was not work-related.

During her EPA tenure, Browner became unpopular with a number of industry groups, especially utilities and heavy manufacturing, as well as with conservatives in Congress, who thought businesses were stifled by her policies. She also battled the Treasury Department at times, and sometimes opposed Clinton himself, who tended to give priority to economic growth over environmental considerations. Nonetheless, Browner was the longest-serving administrator in the history of the agency, staying through both terms of the Clinton presidency – and in the type of position that often sees turnover every three or four years. Robert W. Collin, author of a 2005 text on the agency, assessed her as "one of the ablest administrators ever to lead the EPA", and wrote that she was "completely fearless in her engagement with controversial environmental issues". Clinton himself later stated that Browner had accumulated a long list of important achievements.

== Business career ==
After the Clinton administration, Browner became a founding member of the Albright Group, a "global strategy group" headed by former U.S. Secretary of State Madeleine Albright. As a principal, Browner assisted businesses and other organizations with the challenges of operating internationally, including complying with environmental regulations and climate change. Coca-Cola and Merck & Co. have been among the clients for such international assistance. She also became a founding member and principal of Albright Capital Management, an investment advisory company. During 2002, she taught classes at the study abroad program of her alma mater, now named the Fredric G. Levin College of Law.

Browner is now married to former Congressman Thomas Downey. The marriage, his second, her third, took place on June 21, 2007, in Riverhead, New York. Downey heads a lobbying firm representing clients in the energy industry. In 2006, she and Downey collaborated on behalf of Dubai Ports World, but were unable to persuade Senator Charles Schumer to their viewpoint during the Dubai Ports World controversy.

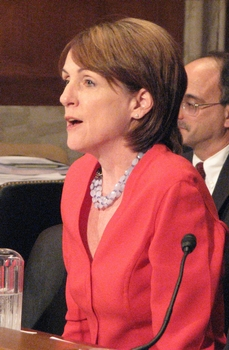
Browner testifying before the U.S. Senate Committee on Environment and Public Works in April 2007

Browner joined the board of the National Audubon Society in 2001 and became chair in 2003; her term expired in 2008. She also joined the board of the Alliance for Climate Protection, an organization founded by Gore in 2006. In 2008, she joined the board of APX, Inc., which specializes in technology infrastructure for the environmental commodities markets including those for carbon offsets and the CDM Gold Standard. She was also on the founding board of the Center for American Progress as well as the boards of the Alliance for Climate Protection and the League of Conservation Voters. She left all of these boards in late 2008 when she was named to serve in the Obama administration. Until summer 2008 she was a member of Socialist International's Commission for a Sustainable World Society, although the commission's web site still had her listed as a member in January 2009.

Her income in 2008 was between $1 million and $5 million from lobbying firm Downey McGrath Group, where her husband was a principal. She also reported $450,000 in "member distribution" income, plus retirement and other benefits from the Albright Group.

Browner retained a political voice during her business career, describing the George W. Bush administration as "the worst environmental administration ever". She also stated that global warming is "the greatest challenge ever faced". In the 2008 presidential election, she was a strong supporter of Hillary Clinton's bid for the Democratic nomination. After Clinton lost her bid, Browner campaigned for Barack Obama in several battleground states and in League of Conservation Voters events.

== Director of the White House Office of Energy and Climate Change Policy ==
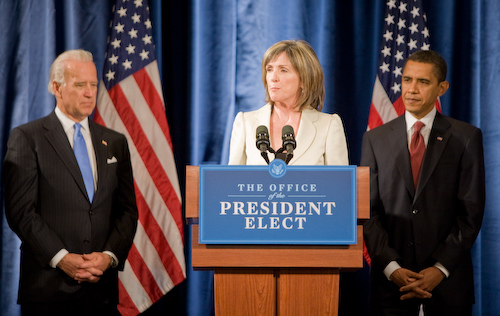
Browner spoke after President-elect Barack Obama announced her appointment as an advisor on December 15, 2008. Vice President-elect Joe Biden looks on.

On November 5, 2008, Browner was named to the advisory board of the Obama-Biden Transition Project.

On December 15, 2008, President-elect Barack Obama named Browner as Assistant to the President for Energy and Climate Change. Officially known as the Director of the White House Office of Energy and Climate Change Policy, she acted as a coordinator for environmental, energy, climate, transport and related matters for the federal government. Her position was sometimes informally described as the "Energy Czar" or the "Climate Czar". (The form "Czarina" was sometimes also used.) It did not require Senate confirmation. Her participation on the Commission for a Sustainable World Society drew criticism from some Republican members of Congress, but the Obama transition team said there was nothing wrong with it. In any case, her power and influence relied primarily on persuasion: "I don't have any independent policymaking authority. It's not like when I was at EPA and I could depend on regulation." Browner's deputy assistant was Heather Zichal, a former legislative director for Senator John Kerry.

The early months of the Obama administration found her working well with the Cabinet members. She was a key negotiator between the administration and automakers in formulating the new United States emission standards in May 2009, and also was a member of the Presidential Task Force on the Auto Industry that bailed out American automakers. She successfully urged incorporation of tens of billions of dollars for renewable energy programs into the American Recovery and Reinvestment Act of 2009. She was a central player in negotiation with Congress of the United States Carbon Cap and Trade Program, seemingly more so than U.S. Energy Secretary Steven Chu, and continued to stress its importance despite the Obama health care plan being the top legislative priority overall. Environmentalists viewed her as a critical liaison to the White House. By September 2009, Republican members of Congress expressed concern that her access to the president had usurped power from other agencies. She also became a brief target of fervent anti-"czar" radio and television commentator Glenn Beck, following the Van Jones resignation.

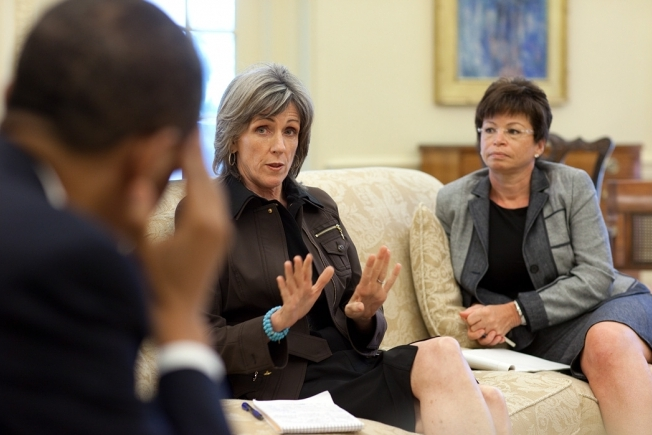
Browner briefed President Obama and Senior Advisor Valerie Jarrett on the BP oil spill on June 1, 2010.

In October 2009, Browner conceded that congressional passage of the cap-and-trade legislation before the end of the year was unlikely, and feared its absence would harm prospects for meaningful international agreement at the Copenhagen United Nations Climate Change Conference in December. By the next month, she moderated her concern but expressed opposition to any congressional "slicing and dicing" that would separate energy and climate concerns. Attempts to pass any kind of climate legislation collapsed in July 2010 due to lack of enough votes in the Senate; Browner appeared on behalf of the administration and said, "Obviously, everyone is disappointed that we do not yet have an agreement on comprehensive legislation." At other times she became philosophical, later saying that she would quote the key lines from one of The Rolling Stones' most well-known songs to Obama: "You can't always get what you want, but you get what you need."

In 2010, Browner became a key part of the administration team handling, and one of the more visible administration figures in issuing public comments about, the BP Deepwater Horizon oil spill in the Gulf of Mexico. In late May 2010 she assessed the spill as "probably the biggest environmental disaster we have ever faced in this country" and said that the administration was "prepared for the worst". She added that "I think what the American people need to know that it is possible we will have oil leaking from this well until August, when the relief wells will be finished." Mike Allen of Politico later wrote, "[Browner's] calm, authoritative television presence during the BP oil disaster made her one of the few officials whose stature was enhanced in the aftermath of the Gulf catastrophe."

With Republicans taking over the House of Representatives following the 2010 midterm elections, chances of climate and energy legislation passing that embodied Browner's and the administration's goals were essentially nil, and Obama conceded as much. As the Obama administration neared its two-year mark and a number of personnel changes were underway, there was a possibility that Browner might be named to another position with broader responsibilities, such as White House Deputy Chief of Staff. But that did not come to pass.

Instead, in late January 2011, White House officials disclosed that Browner would be leaving her position in the fairly near future. Browner said of her unexpected decision, "[there's] no back story – it was just time to go" and that she felt "honored to have a second ... chance to serve". League of Conservation Voters president Gene Karpinski characterized Browner as a "tenacious advocate on our issues" who would be "sorely missed", while a member of the law and energy industry lobbying firm Bracewell & Giuliani said Browner's exit was a good development and that "Her departure may be part of a legitimate effort to pay careful attention to addressing some of the real regulatory obstacles in the way of job creation in the United States." Browner left the White House in March 2011. Her general responsibilities were taken over by her second-in-command, Heather Zichal, from a position within the U.S. Domestic Policy Council.

In late February 2011, while Browner was still in place, the House voted to eliminate the Director of the Office of Energy and Climate Change Policy position altogether. While the move was part of an overall effort to get rid of Obama's "czars", Browner was a particular focus of it. Representative Steve Scalise, who led the effort, said of Browner, "Let her leave, and take the funding, too." In the mid-April 2011 federal spending agreement that averted a possible government shutdown, funding for the position was indeed eliminated (as were three other "czar" roles, most of which were similarly vacant). Obama issued a signing statement protesting the move and saying he would not abide by it, but the point was largely moot as the positions in question, including the Browner one, had already been moved inside the Domestic Policy Council.

== Return to business and advocacy ==
Browner rejoined the Center for American Progress in April 2011 as a Distinguished Senior Fellow and a member of the organization's executive committee. She also rejoined the Albright firm, now known due to merger as the Albright Stonebridge Group, as a Senior Counselor whose responsibilities included providing strategic services to clients in assorted areas of environmental impact. She continued to speak publicly on environmental issues and indicated she was "disappointed" by the Obama administration's September 2011 decision to drop toughening of low-altitude ozone levels in the National Ambient Air Quality Standards.

In July 2013, Browner was named to the board of directors of Bunge Limited, a global agribusiness and food company. In November 2013, she was named to the advisory board of Opower, a software provider to the utility industry. In January 2014, she joined the Global Ocean Commission, an initiative to restore oceanic health and productivity, which issued its final report in 2016. In March 2014, she was elected as chair of the board of directors of the League of Conservation Voters.

In April 2014 she joined the Leadership Council of Nuclear Matters, an industry-backed group that advocates for nuclear power as a means to combat climate change. In that role, she said, "We can't take a carbon-free source of energy off the table." She has acknowledged that looking at herself twenty years earlier, she would "probably not be pro-nuclear", but said, "I think climate change is the biggest problem the world has ever faced" and it would simply be "irresponsible" not to consider nuclear energy as part of the solution.

After a different administration had been in power for a year, Browner was one of several former EPA heads who expressed alarm at the effects that new head Scott Pruitt had had upon the agency. She said that while the George W. Bush administration had treated the EPA with a "sort of benign neglect", in contrast, "Under Pruitt, what they're doing is conscientiously tearing the place down." She was especially concerned that reversing budget cuts would be difficult and that a successful full repeal of the second-term Obama administration's Clean Power Plan could set back an effort to resume combating human-caused global warming some "20 to 30 years". She did not think that the replacing of Pruitt with Andrew R. Wheeler made anything better; overall, she said the actions of this administration were "worse than disappointing. I mean, it is stunning and very alarming."

By 2019, Browner had joined the electric scooter company Lime as a sustainability adviser. She said of her role there, "So we are looking at, how do we make sure that a carbon reduction plan includes micro-mobility? How do we understand what it means to get people out of a car for the last couple of miles?" In reference to the Green New Deal proposal of early 2019, Browner said, "The science is clear: Time is not our friend here. So I have to say I'm as excited about this as I have been about anything in the environmental space in a long time."

Browner joined the law firm of Covington & Burling in September 2021, in the position of Senior Of Counsel in the firm's Environmental, Social, and Governance Practice, as part of a trend of ESG-related concerns becoming important to corporate clients.

== Awards and honors ==
In April 1997, Browner received the Outstanding Mother of the Year Award from the National Mother's Day Committee "for her dedication to providing 'children with a safer, healthier world.'". In September 1997 Browner was honored as one of the 47 Distinguished Alumnae of University of Florida. Browner also has received Glamour magazine's Woman of the Year Award, the Ambulatory Pediatric Association's Advocate for Children Award, the South Florida Chapter of the Audubon Society's Guy M. Bradley Lifetime Achievement Award, and the Lifetime Environmental Achievement Award from the New York State Bar Association. In 1998 she received Vice President Gore's Hammer Award for helping to make government cost less and work better. In 2000, she received the American Lung Association's President's Award for leadership towards "the toughest action in a generation to safeguard public health from the threats posed by air pollution."

== See also ==
- List of U.S. executive branch czars

== Bibliography ==
- Clinton, Bill (2004). My Life. New York: Alfred A. Knopf. ISBN 0-375-41457-6.
- Collin, Robert W. (2005). The Environmental Protection Agency: Cleaning Up America's Act. Westport, Connecticut: Greenwood Publishing Group. ISBN 0-313-33341-6.
- Mintz, Joel A. (1995). Enforcement at the EPA: High Stakes and Hard Choices. Austin: University of Texas Press. ISBN 0-292-75187-7.
- Moritz, Charles, ed. (1994). Current Biography Yearbook 1994. New York: H. W. Wilson Company.
- Orts, Eric W.; Deketelaere, Kurt, eds. (2001). Environmental Contracts: Comparative Approaches to Regulatory Innovation in the United States and Europe (2nd ed.). The Hague: Kluwer Law International. ISBN 90-411-9821-0.
- Turque, Bill (2000). Inventing Al Gore: A Biography. Boston: Houghton Mifflin Co. ISBN 0-395-88323-7.

Political offices
| Preceded by William Reilly | Administrator of the Environmental Protection Agency; 1993–2001 | Succeeded by Christine Todd Whitman |
