= Steve Herman =

Steve Herman may refer to:

- Steve Herman, onetime member of the punk band Crass
- Steve Herman (EPA), formerly a senior administrator at the Environmental Protection Agency
- Steven L. Herman (born 1959), White House bureau chief for the Voice of America
