= Clayton County Courthouse =

Clayton County Courthouse may refer to:

- Clayton County Courthouse (Georgia), Jonesboro, Georgia
- Clayton County Courthouse (Iowa), Elkader, Iowa
