= Timothy Davis House =

Historic house in Iowa, United States

- U.S. National Register of Historic Places
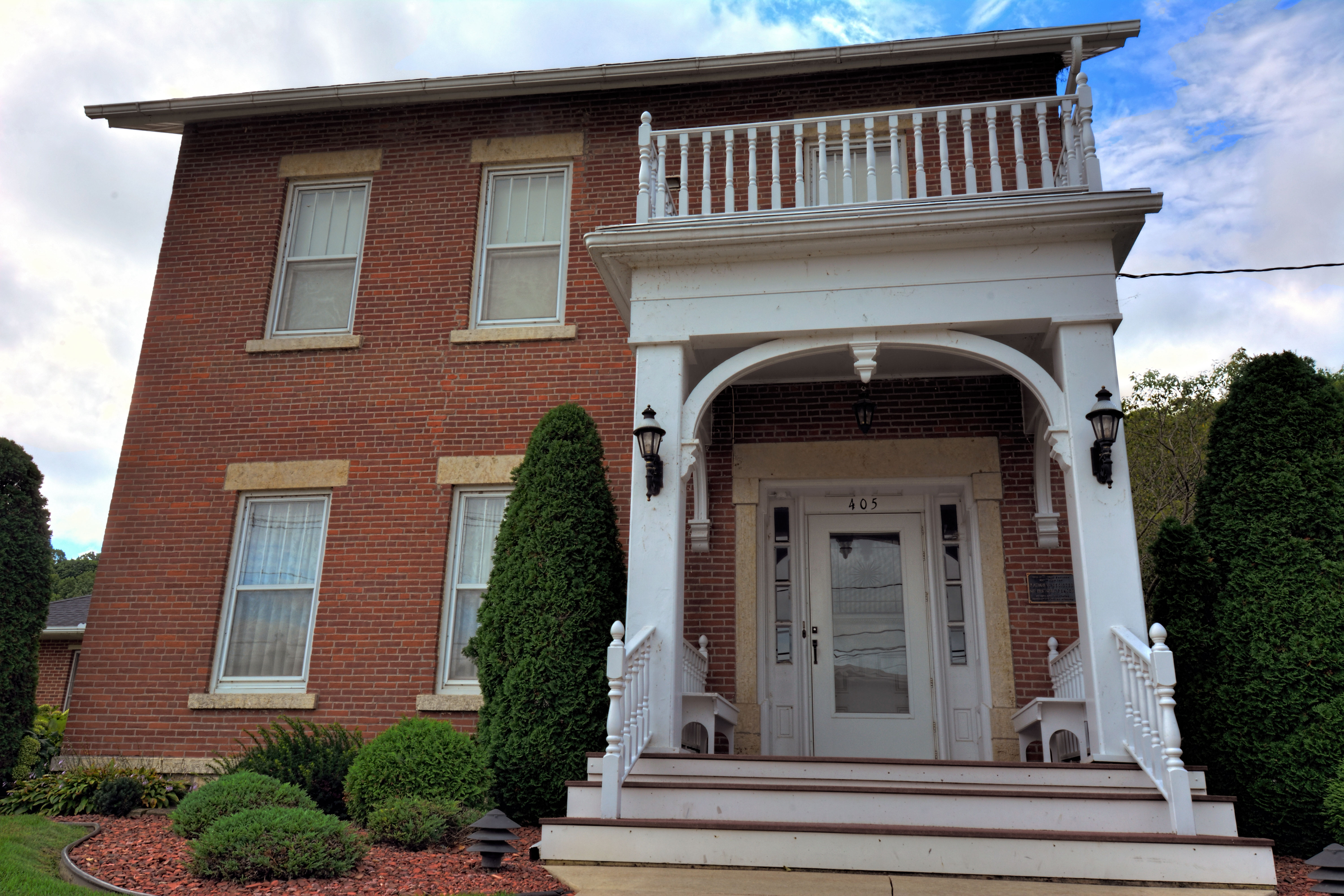

- Location within Iowa Location within the United States
- Location: 405 1st St., NW. Elkader, Iowa
- Coordinates: 42°51′23.5″N 91°24′30.5″W
- Area: less than one acre
- Built: 1860
- NRHP reference No.: 76000746
- Added to NRHP: June 22, 1976

The Timothy Davis House (also known as Witt Funeral Home and the Leonard Funeral Home) is a historic building located at 405 First Street NW in Elkader, Iowa.

== Description and history ==
Timothy Davis was a businessman, attorney and town speculator, who along with John Thompson and Chester Sage laid out the town of Elkader in the mid-1840s. They built a saw- and gristmill here before Davis moved back to Dubuque. He returned to Elkader a couple years later and built this home, where he spent his remaining years. The 2½-story brick structure was built in the vernacular Federal style. Its dominate decorative feature is the front porch, which is a recreation of the original.

Ground was broken for the house on June 13, 1866.

The house has subsequently been used as a funeral home, and it was listed on the National Register of Historic Places on June 22, 1976.
