= St. Joseph's Catholic Church (Elkader, Iowa) =

- St. Joseph Church and Parish Hall
- U.S. National Register of Historic Places
- Location within Iowa Location within the United States
- Location: 330 1st St., NW. Elkader, Iowa
- Coordinates: 42°51′5″N 91°24′13″W
- Area: 1 acre (0.40 ha)
- Built: 1856-1858 (hall); 1899 (church)
- Architectural style: Gothic Revival
- NRHP reference No.: 76000750
- Added to NRHP: November 21, 1976

St. Joseph's Catholic Church is a parish church of the Archdiocese of Dubuque located in Elkader, Iowa, United States. The church and parish hall were both listed on the National Register of Historic Places in 1976.

== History ==
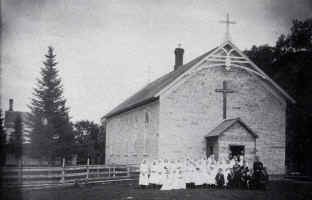
The original St. Joseph's Church built in the 1850s. It has been remodeled and is used as the parish hall.

Catholicism in Elkader can be traced to the missionary activities of a priest from Holy Cross in the 1840s. He also visited mission stations in Guttenberg, Garnavillo, and other communities. The first Mass in Elkader was celebrated in a log cabin where the town's post office now stands. The first baptism was in 1855.

The first resident pastor of the parish was the Rev. Peter McGinnis who came to St. Joseph's in 1856. He purchased land and built the first church in limestone which was quarried from the hill behind the church. The structure took two years before the church was under roof, and even longer before it was furnished. It measured 36 by 80 feet (11 by 24 m) when completed. The pastor had difficulties raising the $4,000 needed to build the church. Parishioners had to stand or kneel on the floor until the pews were added. The three altars added to the church were constructed of wood. In 1876 the three brass bells cast in Cincinnati were bought for $1,800. A bell tower, separate from the church building, was built to hold the bells. The church was extended in 1887 under the leadership of the Rev. J. F. Reilly. The extension created space for a new sanctuary and sacristy. The seating capacity of the church was increased to 100.

== Present Church ==
In 1897 plans were made for a new church because the old church had grown too small for the congregation. Thomas Byrnes, who had previously built the Keystone Arch Bridge and the Bayless Hotel, was awarded the contract to build the church. The cornerstone for the new church was laid on April 24, 1898, and it was dedicated on Thanksgiving Day in 1900. The church, without furnishings, was built for $12,000. Another $7,000 was spent to furnish the church, which brought the total construction bill to $19,000.

The dimensions of the new church measure 50 by 104 feet (15 by 32 m). The top of the cross on the steeple is 142 feet (43 m) above the ground. The church was built in the Gothic Revival style, and like the old church is built of limestone. The roof was covered in Pennsylvania slate. The interior has three naves and is separated by columns which were originally marbleized. The central nave rises to 36 feet (11 m), while the side naves are 27.5 feet (8.4 m). The ornate wood altars from the old church were moved to the new church and the three bells were placed in the tower. The ceiling of the church was frescoed with circular portraits of various saints. The seating capacity was 500. After the new church was built the old church was converted into a parish hall.

Major renovations were made to the church in the 1960s and again in the 1990s. During the renovation in the 1960s many of the original furnishings were removed and the interior was plastered with Kalloite. An altar was constructed so the priest could face the congregation, as well as other changes influenced by the liturgical changes brought about by the Second Vatican Council. The roof was recovered with black slate in the 1980s. In the 1990s many of the original furnishings were brought back into the church and repurposed. The gates to the former communion rail were made into table tops. The old sedalia was remade into a presider's chair. A new ambo, baptismal font and ambry were made to complement the church's Gothic design. The seating capacity of the church was reduced to 300.
