= John Parsons Cook =

American politician

John Cook
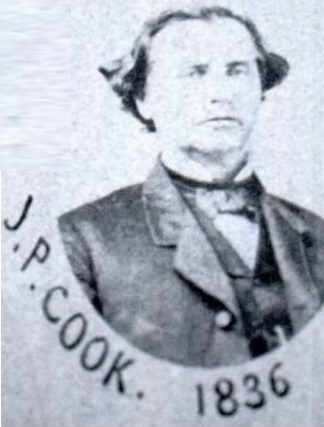

Member of the U.S. House of Representatives from Iowa's 2nd district
- In office March 4, 1853 – March 3, 1855
- Preceded by: Lincoln Clark
- Succeeded by: James Thorington

Member of the Iowa Senate from the 13th district
- In office 1848–1851
- Preceded by: Samuel A. Bissell
- Succeeded by: Joseph Lowe

Personal details
- Born: August 31, 1817 Whitestown, New York, U.S.
- Died: April 17, 1872 (aged 54) Davenport, Iowa, U.S
- Party: Whig (until 1856); Democratic (after 1856)

John Parsons Cook (August 31, 1817 – April 17, 1872) was an American lawyer and politician affiliated with the Whig Party who represented Iowa's 2nd congressional district in the United States House of Representatives from 1853 to 1855.

Born in Whitestown, New York, in 1836 Cook moved with his father to what is now Davenport, Iowa, which at the time was in Michigan Territory and then in Wisconsin Territory. After studying law, he was admitted to the bar in 1842 and commenced practice in Tipton, then in Iowa Territory. He served as member of the Iowa Territorial Council from 1842 to 1845. After Iowa was admitted to the Union in 1846, he served in the Iowa Senate from 1848 to 1851. He relocated to Davenport in 1851 and continued the practice of law.

In 1850, he was an unsuccessful candidate for election to represent the Second District in the Thirty-second Congress, losing to Democrat Lincoln Clark. Two years later, he ran again and won, serving in the Thirty-third Congress from March 4, 1853, to March 3, 1855. He was not a candidate for renomination in 1854, when James Thorington was the Whig nominee and the winner in the general election over the Democratic candidate, ex-Governor Stephen Hempstead. According to one account, "the Iowa Whigs shelved Mr. Cook because of his pro-slavery record." When the Whig party disappeared Cook became a Democrat.

He continued the practice of law and also engaged in banking in Davenport until his death there on April 17, 1872. He was interred in Oakdale Cemetery.

U.S. House of Representatives
Preceded by Lincoln Clark	Member of the U.S. House of Representatives from Iowa's 2nd congressional district March 4, 1853 – March 3, 1855	Succeeded by James Thorington
