= Elkader Downtown Historic District =

Historic district in Iowa, United States

- U.S. National Register of Historic Places
- U.S. Historic district
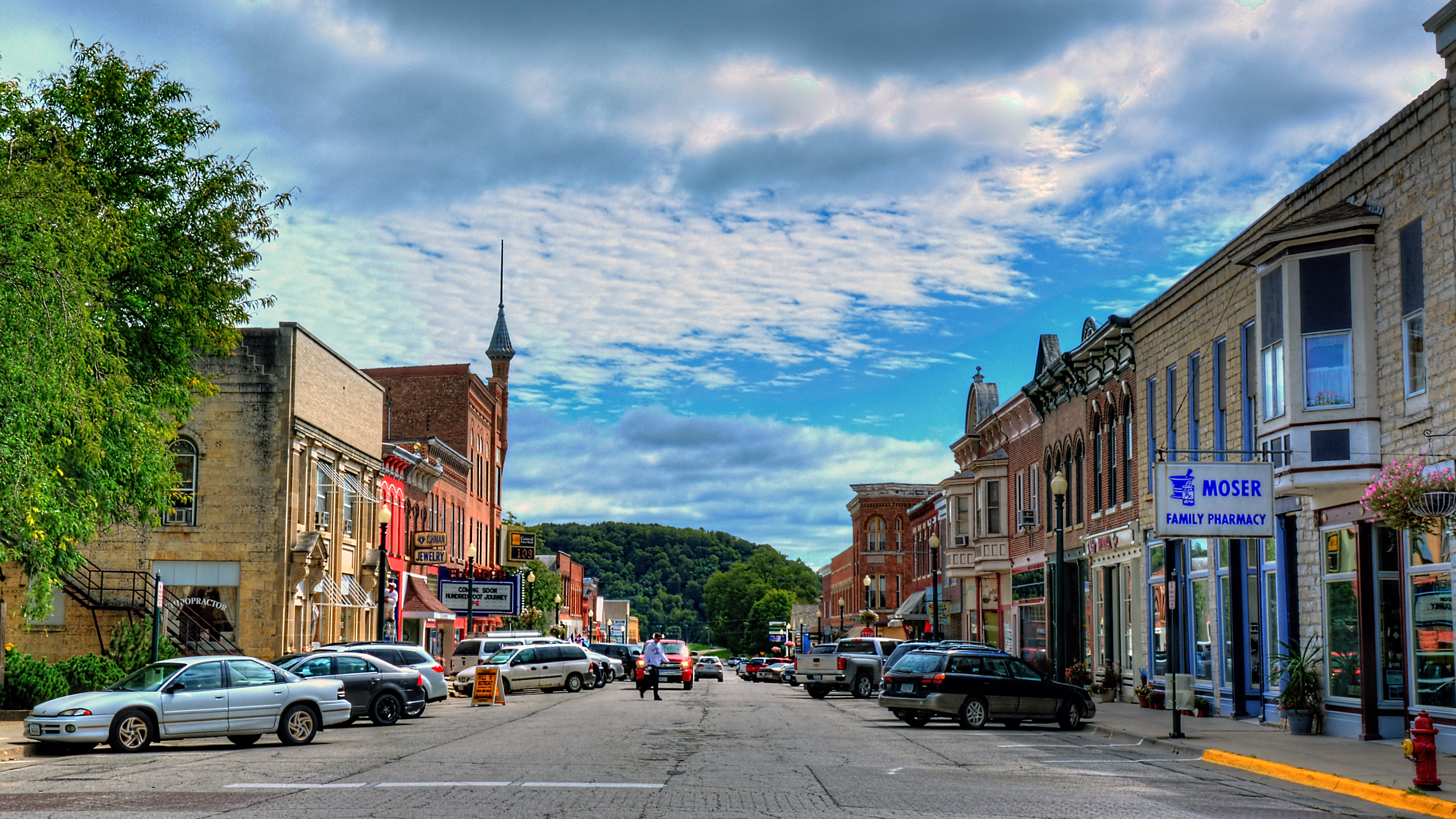

- Location within Iowa Location within the United States
- Location: Portions of the 100 & 200 blocks of Main St. & side streets, Elkader, Iowa
- Coordinates: 42°51′16.4″N 91°24′16″W
- Architect: G.F. Guilbert; Guido Beck
- Architectural style: Late Victorian; Late 19th and 20th Century Revivals
- NRHP reference No.: 12000095
- Added to NRHP: March 13, 2012

The Elkader Downtown Historic District is a nationally recognized historic district located in Elkader, Iowa, United States. It was listed on the National Register of Historic Places in 2012. The district cover's the city's central business district, mainly along Main Street, but also along the intersecting side streets as well. Main Street slopes from north to south with a steep drop toward the Turkey River on the east side of the district. Most of the buildings are masonry, two-story, Victorian structures. There are some one- and three-story buildings as well. The Elkader Opera House (1903), which is located in the district, is individually listed on the National Register.
