= Opower =

American software company

- Type: Subsidiary of Oracle Corporation
- Industry: Software
- Founded: San Francisco, California (2007)
- Founder: Dan Yates; Alex Laskey
- Headquarters: Arlington County, Virginia, U.S.
- Area served: Worldwide
- Key people: Matt Okeefe (Group Vice President)
- Products: Demand Side Management/Energy Efficiency; Software as a Service; Connected Homes/Customer Engagement; Peak Management/Load Shaping; Digital Self Service; Proactive Alerts; DER Customer Engagement; Call Center Interface
- Owner: Oracle Corporation

Opower was an American company founded in 2007, that provides a software-as-a-service customer engagement platform for utilities. It existed as an independent corporation until its acquisition by Oracle Corporation in 2016. The Opower product line is under the Oracle Utilities global business unit.

== History ==
=== Founders ===
Opower was founded in 2007 in Arlington, Virginia by two Harvard University graduates, Dan Yates and Alex Laskey. The two partners met as first-year students at Lowell House at Harvard and later reconnected while living in San Francisco. Prior to Opower, Laskey had worked on a political campaign involving energy issues and around that time he started reading the book, Influence: The Psychology of Persuasion (1983) by Robert B. Cialdini, which outlines what influenced Southern Californians to save energy. In the book there was conclusive evidence that "social proof" (part of nudge theory) worked, a concept grounded in the principle of normative social behavior you could behaviorally influence others. Yates and Laskey realized that at the time, the energy market was focused on new technologies, and by applying information services, the market could be disrupted.

The initial service they developed was the energy-efficiency campaigns, detailed home-energy reports which incorporated behavioral science techniques. The reports include targeted tips that seek to motivate customers to lower their energy consumption to the "normal" neighborhood rate. The reports also feature smiley-face emoticons for the most energy-efficient homes, a feature that Opower added after research showed that some consumers who used less energy than average started using more once they knew the norm. The reports also compare energy usage among neighbors with similarly sized houses.

=== President Obama's visit (2010) ===
President Barack Obama visited Opower headquarters in Arlington on March 5, 2010. He touted the company as an economic "success story" amid a troubled economy and as a "great emblem" for clean energy jobs. During the visit, Obama said the company's growth is "a model of what we want to be seeing all across the country."

He made the visit two months after announcing a "$2.3 billion program" of tax credits for "green jobs." "The work you do here...is making homes more energy efficient, it's saving people money, it's generating jobs, and it's putting America on the path to a clean energy future", Obama said at Opower. The White House released a video of Obama's appearance.

=== Later work ===
In July 2010, Opower opened a second office in San Francisco and had Fred Butler, a former president of the National Association of Regulatory Utility Commissioners (NARUC) and commissioner of the New Jersey Board of Public Utilities, join its advisory board.

On September 1, 2010, the World Economic Forum announced the company as a Technology Pioneer for 2011.

In November 2010, the company announced its third round of venture capital funding, a $50 million investment led by Accel Partners and Kleiner Perkins Caufield & Byers, to accelerate its expansion.

In 2012, Opower launched a popular data blog—called the Outlier—which presented statistical analysis of the company's energy data storehouse, spanning more than 50 million households worldwide. Several analyses attracted mainstream news coverage, including the impact of the Super Bowl on America's energy use, the electricity usage patterns of electric car owners, and variation in the compass orientation of rooftop solar panels.

In 2013, Opower added former utility CEOs John Rowe and Dick Kelly, and former White House Director, Carol Browner, to its advisory board. Tom Brady, former chairman of BGE, was named chairman of the advisory board.

Opower held its initial public offering on April 4, 2014.

On May 2, 2016, Opower announced that it was being acquired by Oracle for $532 million.

== Science and technology ==
Opower's software uses statistical algorithms to perform pattern recognition analysis from data in order to derive information for utility customers. Without any devices installed in the home, the platform can perform usage-disaggregation analysis, presenting end users information, such as heating or cooling usage apart from overall usage, and thus allowing them to spot additional opportunities to save money. Since the launch of the Opower platform and service, the average customer using Opower has cut energy usage by 2% to 5%, reducing 13 billion lbs of CO_{2} emissions.

== Awards and honors ==
In May 2013, Opower was named to the Inaugural CNBC Disruptors 50 List.

In November 2013, Opower was named the #1 fastest-growing tech company in the DC region, and #20 in the US, by Deloitte.

== See also ==
- Energy management software
- Smart grid
- Clean technology
