= Timothy Davis (Iowa politician) =

American politician

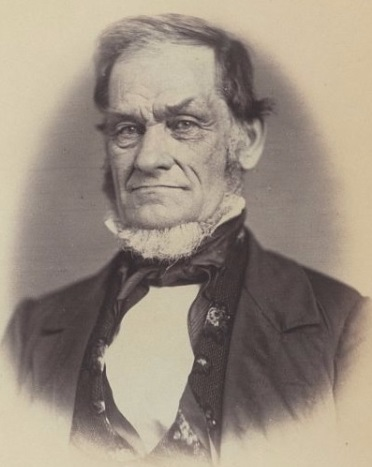
- From 1859's McClees' Gallery of Photographic Portraits of the Senators, Representatives & Delegates of the Thirty-Fifth Congress

Member of the U.S. House of Representatives from Iowa's 2nd district
- In office March 4, 1857 – March 3, 1859
- Preceded by: James Thorington
- Succeeded by: William Vandever

Personal details
- Born: March 29, 1794 Newark, New Jersey, US
- Died: April 27, 1872 (aged 78) Elkader, Iowa, US
- Resting place: Elkader Cemetery, Elkader, Iowa
- Party: Republican
- Profession: Attorney; Businessman

Timothy Davis (March 29, 1794 – April 27, 1872) was an attorney, businessman, and politician in Missouri and Iowa. He is most notable for his service as a one-term U.S. representative from Iowa's 2nd congressional district.

== Early life ==
Davis was born in Newark, New Jersey to Sylvanus Davis and Polly (Carnes) Davis.

After the War of 1812, lawyers from Tennessee, Kentucky, Virginia, and North Carolina, migrated to Missouri. Timothy Davis migrated to Kentucky in 1816 and passed the bar in 1817.

Among the lawyers settling in Missouri was Timothy Davis, who came to Jackson, Missouri in 1818, where he lived for 18 months, later to relocate to St. Genevieve, Missouri. In 1818, his nephew, Greer W. Davis, who later became a prominent attorney on the Missouri circuit court, practicing law for 54 years.

In 1823, he married Nancy Wilson, and together they had five children: Louis Valle, Wilson Scott, Mary Elizabeth, Emily, and Juliette. In 1827, he purchased land from August St. Marie, who had established a woodyard in 1809, and platted Ste. Marie's Landing, where he served as postmaster. He owned slaves.

In 1836, he moved to Dubuque, where he established the Davis & Crawford law firm. He continued to practice until his partner died in 1849, at which point he took Frederick E. Bissell as a law partner The following year, he sold the property to the Missouri Iron Company under several conditions, including, "no shop or house for selling by retail or giving away intoxicating liquors or for gambling and no lottery office, or house of ill fame shall ever be established upon or used upon City lots or any of the above lands hereby sold and conveyed, under penalty of the absolute forfeiture of said lots."

In 1838 he built a saw mill with George H. Walworth and Gideon Ford at the Buffalo forks on the Wapsipinicon River, the first settlement near Anamosa.

== Elkader and The Elkader Flour Mill Company ==
In 1844, John Thompson purchased land on which a flour mill would later be erected (Today at the location of the public library at 130 N. Main St.). In 1845, John Thompson, along with Davis and Chester Sage, had the town of Elkader, Iowa surveyed, later to be platted on June 22, 1846. Davis was tasked with naming the town, and ultimately settled on Elkader, after Emir Abdelkader whose resistance against French colonialism he admired. After settling on the name, the Elkader Flour Mill Company was established along with a hotel and store.

Over time, Davis, Thompson, and Sage found success in the flour mill industry. Thompson established mills at Clermont, Iowa and Motor, Iowa. Davis collaborated with G. W. T. Grant in the establishment of Pickwick Mill in Pickwick, Minnesota, which he sold off to his son, Wilson Davis. In 1856 Sage sold his interest in the Elkader Flour Mill Company to Thompson and Davis, who continued to operate the company.

As the company grew, Elkader did as well. Elkader ultimately became the county seat of Clayton County in 1868. Despite a catastrophic fire that destroyed the Elkader mill in 1860, the company continued to be successful.

He lived in Dubuque until 1854 and stayed until 1857. He then returned to Dubuque, only to return a few years later to establish his home, Timothy Davis House, at 405 First Street was listed on the National Register of Historic Places on June 22, 1976.

== Politics ==
Davis began his career in politics in St. Genevieve, Missouri where he practiced law and established the town St. Mary, Missouri.

He was an unsuccessful candidate for election in 1848 to the Thirty-first Congress.

In 1856, the Republican Party's first year as a major political party, Davis became the party's nominee to represent Iowa's 2nd congressional district in the U.S. House. He was also considered "the Know-Nothing (Party's) fusion candidate." He won the November 1856 general election by defeating veteran ex-Congressman Shepherd Leffler, a Democrat who was the Second District's original representative. The same day, fellow Republican Samuel Curtis of Keokuk, Iowa, won the race in Iowa's only other district. Davis and Curtis were the first Iowans elected to Congress as Republicans. As a member of the Thirty-fifth Congress, Davis served from March 4, 1857 to March 3, 1859. He was the only Iowa congressman born before 1800. At his party's 1858 district convention, he was not a candidate for renomination.

After completing his term, he resumed the practice of law and also engaged in business activities in Dubuque.

== Later life ==
In fall 1857, after Nancy's passing, he married Jane B. O'Farrell with whom he lived until Sunday, April 27, 1872 when he died. He was on his front porch, having a lively discussion with John Thompson when he suddenly fell back in his chair, threw his hands up, and exclaimed "Oh!", immediately expiring. He was interred the following Tuesday at Elkader Cemetery.

== Sources ==
- United States Congress. "Timothy Davis (id: D000140)". Biographical Directory of the United States Congress.

U.S. House of Representatives
Preceded by James Thorington	Member of the U.S. House of Representatives from Iowa's 2nd congressional district March 4, 1857 – March 3, 1859	Succeeded by William Vandever
