= Donald Harstad =

American novelist and former police officer

- Born: 1945 (age 80–81)
- Occupation: novelist
- Writing career
- Period: 1999–present
- Genre: Fiction
- Subjects: Crime, Rural Iowa
- Notable works: Eleven Days, Big Thaw

Donald Harstad is an American novelist and former police officer specializing in crime fiction and police procedurals. Prior to taking up writing, he had a 26-year career with the Sheriff's Department of Clayton County, Iowa, retiring as a Deputy Sheriff. His first novel, Eleven Days, was loosely based on a case he worked on during that time, and he is known for drawing on his career in law enforcement for details of police and investigative procedure.

All of his novels are set in "Nation County", a fictional rural county in Iowa, and include many of the same characters, primarily centering on police officer Carl Houseman, a loose analog for Harstad himself. His novels have appeared in nine languages.

Harstad lives in Elkader, Iowa, with his wife of 40 years, his former high school sweetheart with whom he has one daughter. In a 2002 interview, he said that he has always been fascinated by the people mixed up in matters that come to the attention of the police, and as a novelist he is looking at how chains of bad choices lead to outcomes.

== Bibliography ==
=== Novels ===
==== Carl Houseman series ====
1. Eleven Days (1999) Bantam ISBN 0-553-58148-1
2. Known Dead (2000) Bantam ISBN 0-553-58095-7
3. The Big Thaw (2001) Bantam ISBN 0-553-58303-4
4. Code 61 (2003) Bantam ISBN 0-553-58098-1
5. A Long December (2003) Rugged Land ISBN 1-59071-013-4
6. November Rain (2015) Crooked Lane Books ISBN 161129049X

==== Other novels ====
- Three Octobers (2005) Rugged Land ISBN 1590710398, 9781590710395

=== Anthologies and collections ===
Anthology or Collection	Contents	Publication Date	Publisher	ISBN
An Apple for the Creature	Academy Field Trip	Oct 2012	Ace Penguin Group Jo Fletcher Books Wheeler Publishing Brilliance Audio	ISBN 0425256804, 9780425256800
