= Elkader Opera House =

- U.S. National Register of Historic Places
- U.S. Historic district – Contributing property
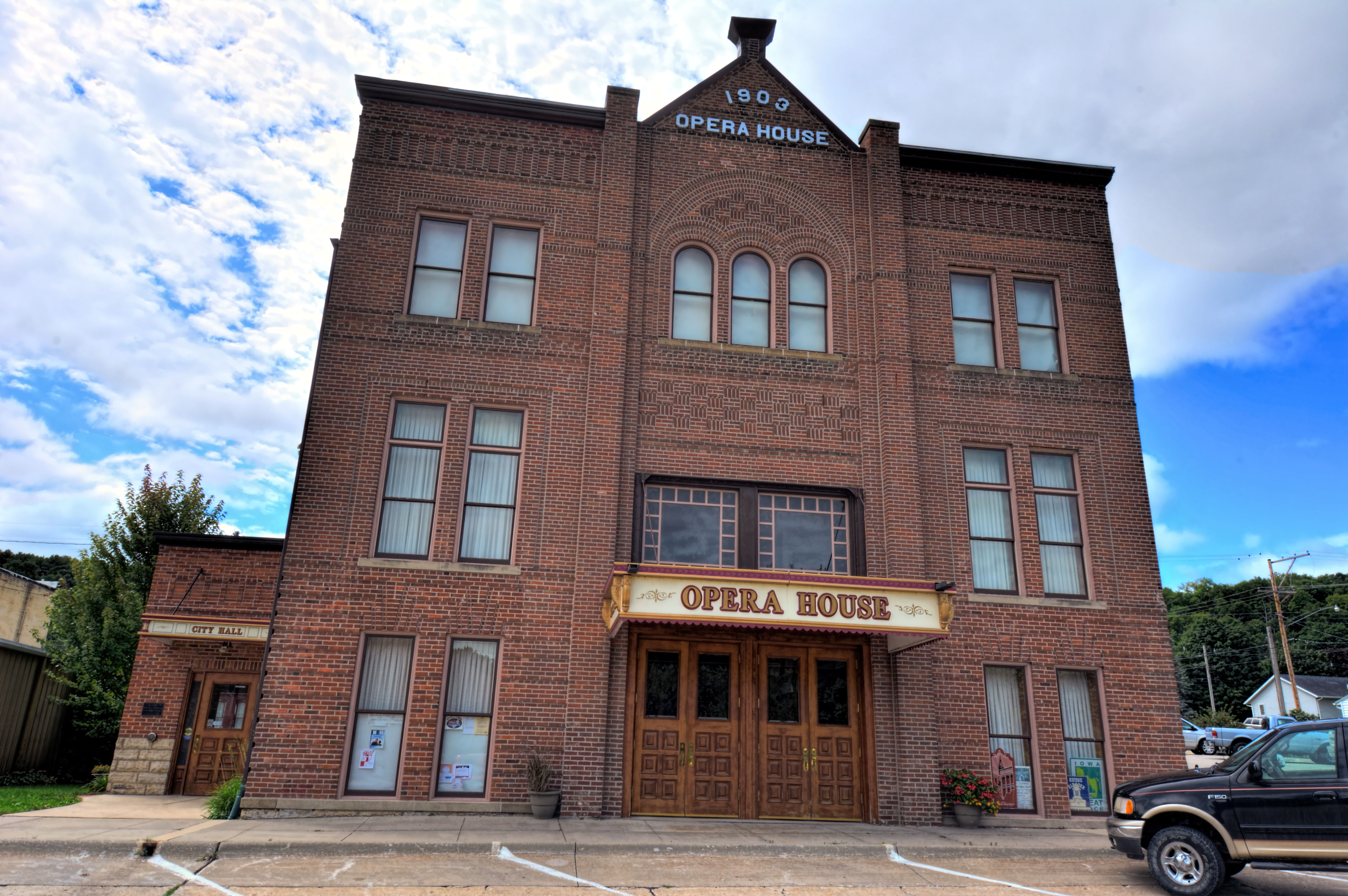

- Location within Iowa Location within the United States
- Location: 207 N. Main St. Elkader, Iowa
- Coordinates: 42°51′19.5″N 91°24′20.7″W
- Built: 1903
- Architect: Shick & Roth
- Part of: Elkader Downtown Historic District (ID12000095)
- NRHP reference No.: 76000748
- Added to NRHP: October 8, 1976

The Elkader Opera House is a historic building located in Elkader, Iowa, United States. The building was individually listed on the National Register of Historic Places in 1976. In 2012 it was included as a contributing property in the Elkader Downtown Historic District.

== History ==
The Opera House opened on November 27, 1903 replacing a previous opera house on the same location that was destroyed by fire the previous year. The first show performed on its stage was George M. Cohan's "The Governor's Son," which was performed by the Cohan Brothers. The Opera House was on the Chicago-Minneapolis circuit when it first opened. Ed Wynn was on at least one playbill in those years. The other functions the building has hosted have included a community room, dance hall, roller rink, library, fire station, economic development office, city hall, and the Abd el-Kader Sister City Museum. The first floor main facade was significantly altered for it to be used as a firehouse in 1949. Two double doors were placed in the center and right bays for the firetrucks. A restoration project was begun in 1963 to return the auditorium to its original condition. It was extensively renovated in 2004. The opera house is now the home of the Keystone Barbershop Chorus and the Opera House Players. It also still houses Elkader's City Hall.

== Architecture ==
The three-story brick building features a symmetrical facade. The center bay has three round arch windows that are flanked above and below with ornamental brickwork. There is also brickwork near the cornice level of the side bays. The three bays are separated by brick pilasters. An entrance on the side of the building was created for city hall.
