= Heather Zichal =

American energy and climate policy expert

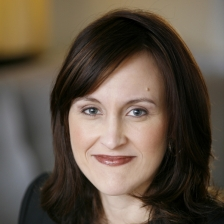

Personal details
- Born: February 8, 1976 (age 49)
- Political party: Democratic
- Education: Rutgers University, New Brunswick (BA)

Heather Renée Zichal (last name pronounced with long 'i') (born February 8, 1976) is an American executive, consultant, and political advisor who specializes in climate change and environmental policy.

Zichal began her career serving as a legislative director and campaign advisor to several Democratic congressional members. She then served as the Deputy Assistant to the President for Energy and Climate Change in the Barack Obama administration starting in 2009. Following the early 2011 departure of Carol Browner from the administration, Zichal was tasked with coordinating the administration's energy and climate policy and was the architect of the Clean Power Plan.

In November 2013, she left the administration and became a private consultant and a fellow at the Atlantic Council. She has served on several company boards and councils, including that of Cheniere Energy, a liquified natural gas company, and was The Nature Conservancy's vice president for corporate engagement. From late 2020 through September 2022 she was head of the wind and solar focused American Clean Power Association. In October 2022 she became "global head of sustainability" at JPMorgan Chase.

== Early life and education ==
Zichal grew up in Elkader, Iowa. Her father worked as a family physician and her mother as a hospital administrator. She has one younger brother. Zichal graduated from Central Community School District in 1994. She attended Cook College at Rutgers University, where she studied environmental policy and graduated in 1999.

== Career ==
=== Legislative assistant and campaign advisor ===
While at Rutgers, she interned at the state chapter of the Sierra Club and was part of a panel interviewing candidates for New Jersey's 12th congressional district. After Democrat Rush D. Holt, Jr. defeated Republican incumbent Michael J. Pappas, in part due to support from environmentalists, Holt hired Zichal as his legislative director. She held the same position for Representative Frank Pallone from 2001 to 2002. She then was a legislative assistant and later director for U.S. Senator John Kerry from 2002 to 2008. She also worked as an assistant for the Senate Small Business and Entrepreneurship Committee. In these positions she worked on legislation to address climate change, reduce the country's dependence on oil for energy, and to protect American natural resources.

Zichal also served as a top advisor on energy and environmental issues to the 2004 Kerry presidential campaign and the 2008 Obama presidential campaign. She had first met Obama when he was lost in one of the Senate buildings and asked her for directions.

=== Obama administration ===
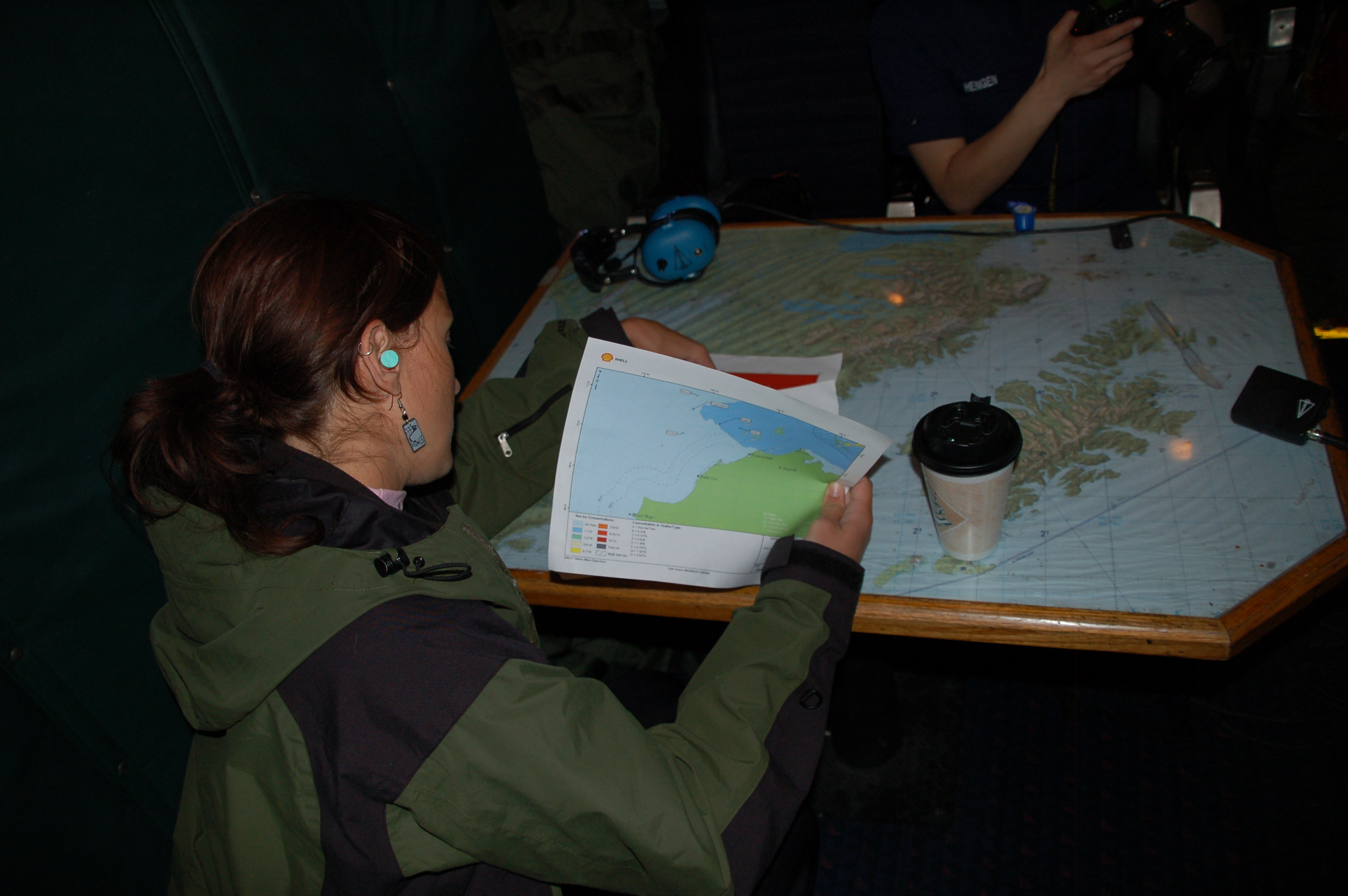
Zichal reviewing the location of the Arctic ice field during an Arctic Domain Awareness flight in 2009

After serving on the Obama-Biden Transition Project in its Energy and Environment Policy Working Group, she was named to be Deputy Assistant to the President for Energy and Climate Change in December 2008, to serve as deputy to Carol Browner, who was named director of the White House Office of Energy and Climate Change Policy (as such, Browner's position was also informally referred to as the "Climate Czar" or "Energy Czar"). Zichal took office in January 2009. She was part of the administration response to the 2010 BP oil spill and supervised later modifications of safety standards for offshore oil and natural gas extraction.

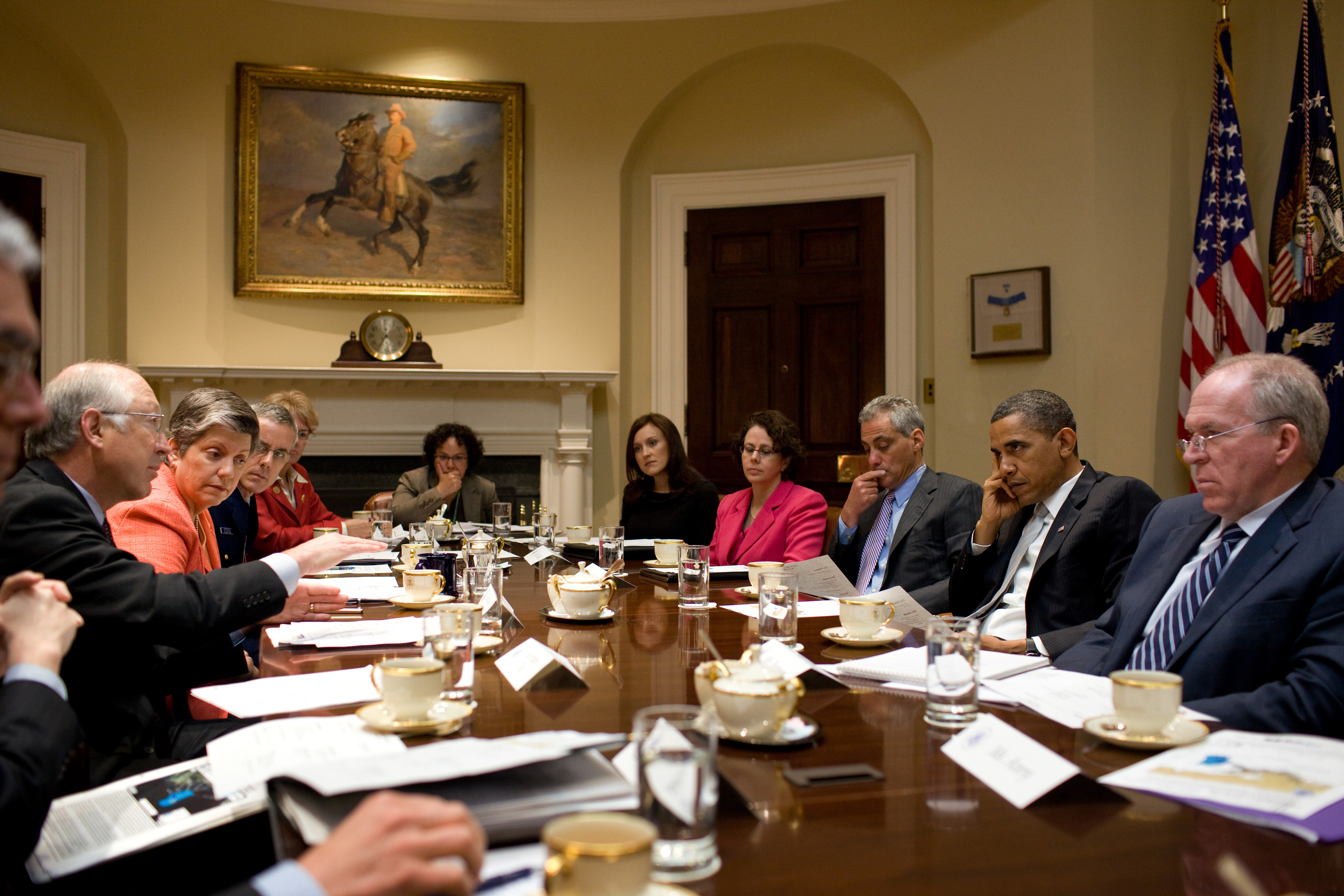
Zichal (center-right) at a 2010 White House meeting of President Obama, cabinet officials and other staff, to discuss the BP oil spill

When Browner left the White House in March 2011, Zichal took over the general responsibilities of coordinating the administration's energy and climate policy, now operating from within the U.S. Domestic Policy Council (the "czar" position itself having been reorganized away by the White House and its funding subsequently abolished by Congress in the mid-April 2011 federal spending agreement that averted a possible government shutdown). As such she became one of the White House staff members tasked with implementation of the Presidential Climate Action Plan. Her job also involved outreach activities towards the energy industry and environmentalists as well as dealing with Congress. With Republicans having taken over the House of Representatives following the 2010 midterm elections, chances of the large-scale climate and energy legislation passing that Browner had worked towards were essentially nil. At first the administration pursued more modest goals that could attract bipartisan support, such as reducing oil imports and promoting clean or renewable energy sources. The White House subsequently gave credit to Zichal for putting into place policy changes that would lead to a doubling of wind and solar power generation.

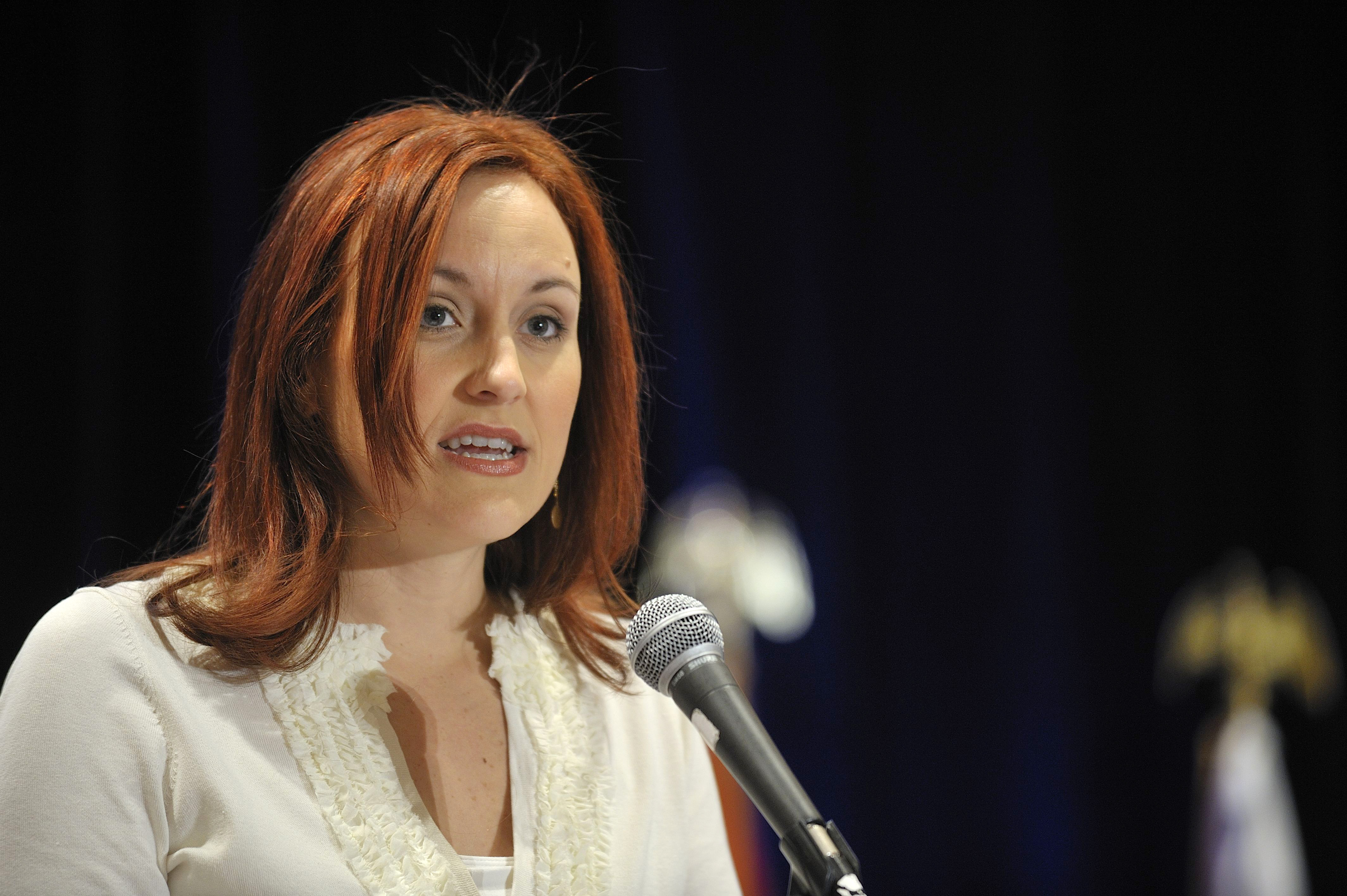
Zichal at a microphone in 2011

During the early portion of Obama's second term, Zichal was one of the public faces of the administration's approach of addressing climate change via federal regulatory action. She was the architect of a June 2013 plan to reduce greenhouse gases resulting from the nation's power plants by having the Environmental Protection Agency issue revised standards for carbon emissions from new and existing plants. They were the first ever such restrictions. (This plan eventually became known as the Clean Power Plan when issued in revised form in 2015; Zichal was still considered one of its architects. It became politically controversial during the 2016 U.S. presidential election, with opponents deriding it as the "War on Coal". Its implementation was blocked while challenges to it were made in U.S. federal courts.)

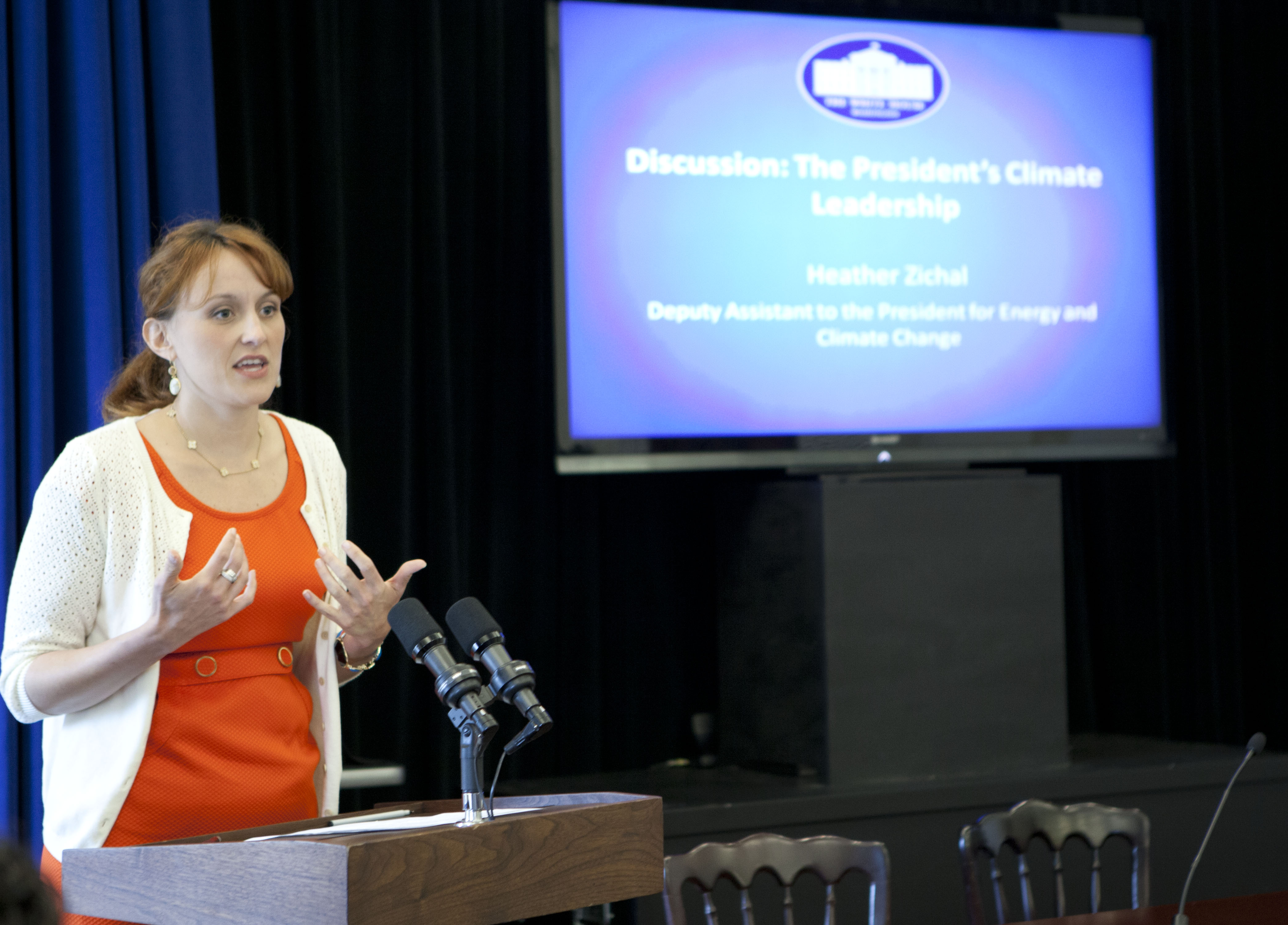
Zichal speaking at a White House Leadership Summit on Women, Climate and Energy in 2013

A 2013 profile from National Journal described her as having "developed a reputation among players across the energy spectrum as a smart, pragmatic, and serious player." A Democratic political operative and energy industry lobbyist called Zichal a "skilled communicator and negotiator" and said she was "dogged in her pursuit of gaining consensus with external stakeholders and delivering on a clean energy agenda for this administration." However, former vice president and ardent environmentalist Al Gore complained in mid-2013 that the administration was not giving climate change sufficient priority, and making reference to Zichal said, "He does not yet have a team in the White House to help him implement solutions to the climate crisis. He hasn't staffed up for it ... he's got one person who hasn't been given that much authority."

In October 2013, Zichal announced that she would soon be stepping down from her post. She was given the chance to accept other positions within the administration, but declined. She was one of the last of Obama's 2008 campaign advisors to still be in the administration; she had been high valued inside the administration and by one report Obama had personally urged her to stay. Her last day was November 8, 2013, and she was succeeded by Dan Utech.

=== Consultant, board member and executive ===
Zichal subsequently became an independent energy consultant, working at her own firm called Zichal Inc. In January 2015 she was named a senior fellow at the Atlantic Council. There she is part of the council's Global Energy Center. She served on the board of Cheniere Energy, a liquified natural gas company, from 2014 to 2018, as well as the board of Spanish multinational-owned Abengoa Bioenergy. In addition she is an operating advisor at Broadscale, an energy-focused investing firm, and a senior advisor at an enterprise called Sensity. She joined the board of non-profit Solar Foundation and Naturevest, the conservation investing organization within the Nature Conservancy. In 2018, she became the Nature Conservancy's vice president for corporate engagement, serving until 2019. In 2019, she was announced as the executive director of the Blue Prosperity Coalition, another conservation and climate-oriented group.

She remained active in the public debate over climate change and energy policy. During the 2016 Democratic Party presidential primaries, she supported Hillary Clinton.

In 2019, she became an advisor to the Joe Biden 2020 presidential campaign, helping him craft a "middle ground" climate and energy policy, in contrast to the Green New Deal. Zichal said of those backing the Green New Deal, "I respect where they are coming from. What we learned from the Obama administration is unless we find middle ground on these issues, we risk not having any policies. ... [Biden will] build a new climate coalition. Unions and environmentalists are searching for common ground. We can't drive a common agenda unless we work together." During the presidential transition of Joe Biden there was speculation she might join the new administration, but her stint on the board of Cheniere Energy brought opposition against her from progressive organizations who were pushing against anyone being appointed to an environment-related position if they had worked in the fossil fuel industry.

Instead, in December 2020 she was named as the chief executive of the American Clean Power Association, a newly formed trade group representing companies involved in wind and solar energy, storage and transmission, but also natural gas companies and utilities. It is the successor organization to the American Wind Energy Association. The Biden administration's environmental policy placed an emphasis on developing wind power, such as a goal announced in October 2021 to have seven major offshore wind farms operating off U.S. coasts by 2030; Zichal said that goal was "ambitious but achievable" and a vital part of any plan to achieve complete carbon pollution-free electricity generation by 2035. During her tenure she supervised a merger with the U.S. Energy Storage Association. Shortly before leaving the American Clean Power Association, she endorsed legislation proposed by West Virginia Senator Joe Manchin to reform permitting processes in order to speed up the development of both fossil-fuel and renewable energy projects – a proposal that was endorsed by President Joe Biden and other Democratic Party leaders but failed to pass the Senate.

In September 2022 she left the American Clean Power Association to join multinational investment bank JP Morgan Chase, where her role was to be "global head of sustainability". She said that to leave the association was the most difficult decision of her career, but that she had accomplished a lot with it. The position change prompted new accusations from some environmental advocates that she has used her "green-sounding credentials" to advance her career and favor corporate interests.
