= James Thorington =

American politician

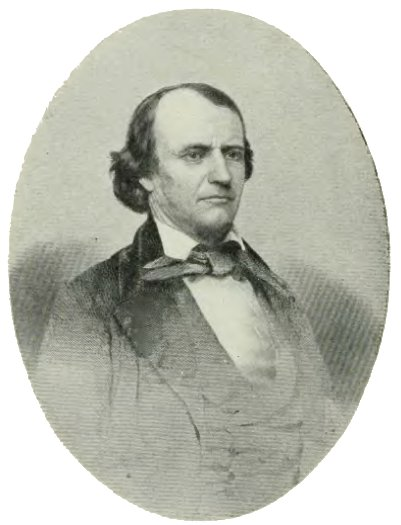

Member of the U.S. House of Representatives from Iowa's 2nd district
- In office March 4, 1855 – March 3, 1857
- Preceded by: John Parsons Cook
- Succeeded by: Timothy Davis

Personal details
- Born: May 7, 1816 Wilmington, North Carolina, USA
- Died: June 13, 1887 (aged 71) Santa Fe, New Mexico Territory, USA
- Party: Whig; Republican
- Profession: Attorney

James Thorington (May 7, 1816 – June 13, 1887) was a frontiersman, lawyer, judge, and one-term U.S. representative from Iowa's 2nd congressional district.

== Biography ==
Born in Wilmington, North Carolina, Thorington moved with his parents to Montgomery, Alabama, in 1827. He attended the common schools, the military school in Fayetteville, North Carolina from 1830 to 1832, and the University of Alabama at Tuscaloosa from 1832 to 1835.

He studied law in Montgomery, Alabama. He interrupted his studies to trap and trade on the upper Missouri and Columbia Rivers from 1837 to 1839. He then moved to Davenport, Iowa, in 1839. After winning election as Davenport's mayor in 1843, he was admitted to the bar in 1844, commenced practice in Davenport, and remained as mayor until 1847. He was probate judge of Scott County, Iowa from 1843 to 1851, and the clerk of the district court from 1846 to 1854.

In 1854, Thorington was elected as a Whig to the Thirty-fourth Congress (March 4, 1855 – March 3, 1857). While he was in Congress, the Iowa Republican Party was founded, and he was a charter member. For that reason "he has been styled as the first Republican congressman from Iowa." In 1856, he was a candidate for the Republican Party's nomination for his seat, but lost at the district convention on the ninth ballot to Timothy Davis, who would go on to win the general election.

After his term ended, Thorington became Scott County's sheriff from 1859 to 1863, and its recorder from 1864 to 1868.

He was appointed consul at Aspinwall, Colombia, on January 21, 1873. He was appointed commercial agent at the same city on May 27, 1873, and served in both positions until October 21, 1882.

He died while on a visit to his daughter at Santa Fe, New Mexico Territory, on June 13, 1887. He was interred in Oakdale Cemetery in Davenport.

U.S. House of Representatives
Preceded by John P. Cook	Member of the U.S. House of Representatives from Iowa's 2nd congressional district March 4, 1855 – March 3, 1857	Succeeded by Timothy Davis
