= Lincoln Clark =

American politician (1800–1886)

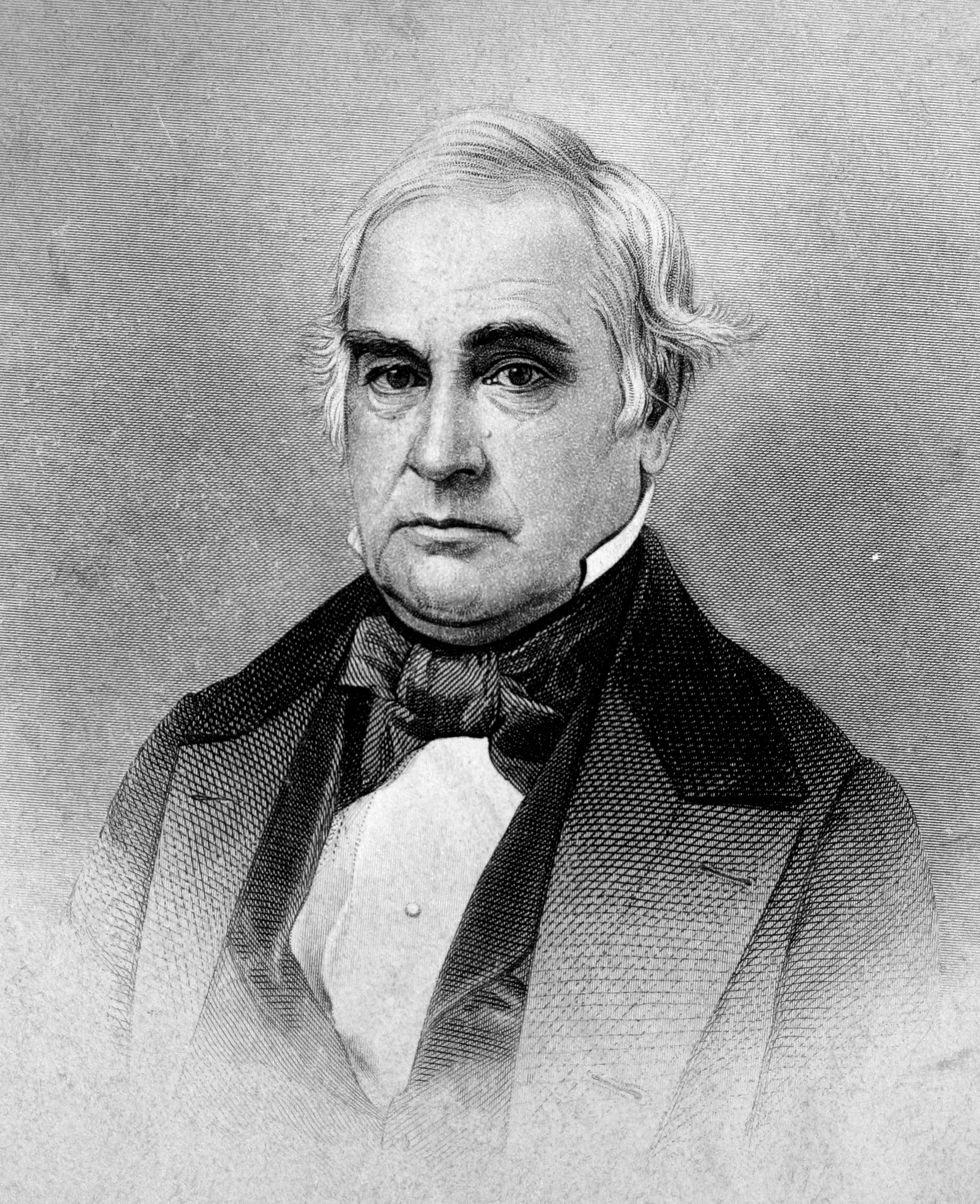

Member of the U.S. House of Representatives from Iowa's 2nd district
- In office March 4, 1851 – March 3, 1853
- Preceded by: Shepherd Leffler
- Succeeded by: John Parsons Cook

7th Attorney General of Alabama
- In office 1838–1839
- Governor: Arthur P. Bagby
- Preceded by: John D. Phelan
- Succeeded by: Matthew W. Lindsay

Member of the Alabama House of Representatives
- In office 1845–1846
- Constituency: Tuscaloosa County
- In office 1834–1836
- Constituency: Pickens County

Personal details
- Born: August 9, 1800 Conway, Massachusetts, U.S.
- Died: September 16, 1886 Conway, Massachusetts, U.S.
- Party: Democratic
- Education: Amherst College
- Occupation: Lawyer; politician

Lincoln Clark (August 9, 1800 – September 16, 1886) was a lawyer and one-term Democratic U.S. Representative from Iowa's 2nd congressional district. His life began and ended in the same small town in western Massachusetts, but included service in every branch of Alabama state government, the U.S. Congress, and the Iowa General Assembly.

Born in Conway, Massachusetts, Clark attended the district and private schools. He was graduated from Amherst College in 1825. After studying law, he was admitted to the bar in 1831 and commenced practice in Pickensville, Alabama. He served as member of the Alabama House of Representatives in 1834, 1835, and 1845. He moved to Tuscaloosa in 1836. Clark was elected Alabama Attorney General by the Legislature in 1839. He delivered an oration in Tuscaloosa in 1845 commemorating Andrew Jackson. Clark was appointed circuit judge by Governor Benjamin Fitzpatrick in 1846. He owned slaves.

Clark moved to Dubuque, Iowa, in 1848. Two years later, in 1850, he was elected as a Democrat to represent Iowa's 2nd congressional district, defeating Whig candidate John Parsons Cook by only 150 votes out of over 15,000 cast. Clark served in the Thirty-second Congress, from March 4, 1851, to March 3, 1853. In a rematch in 1852, Cook unseated Clark. Two years later, Clark tried again to regain his seat, but was defeated.

In 1857, Clark was elected to the Iowa House of Representatives, and played an important role in adapting the laws to the new Iowa Constitution. In the 1860 presidential election, he participated in the Iowa state Democratic convention (declining to follow the breakaway faction supporting the John C. Breckinridge candidacy), where he was elected as a potential presidential elector for U.S. Senator Stephen A. Douglas. During the Civil War, he sided with his party's "War Democrat" faction, in opposition to the pro-secession "Mahoneyite" faction of followers of jailed newspaper editor D.A. Mahoney.

Clark eventually left Iowa to practice law in Chicago, Illinois. He was appointed United States Register in Bankruptcy in 1866.

In 1869, he retired from active business and returned to Conway, Massachusetts. He died in Conway on September 16, 1886. He was interred in Howland Cemetery.

U.S. House of Representatives
Preceded by Shepherd Leffler	Member of the U.S. House of Representatives from Iowa's 2nd congressional district March 4, 1851 – March 3, 1853	Succeeded by John P. Cook
