= Albright Stonebridge Group =

American business advisory firm

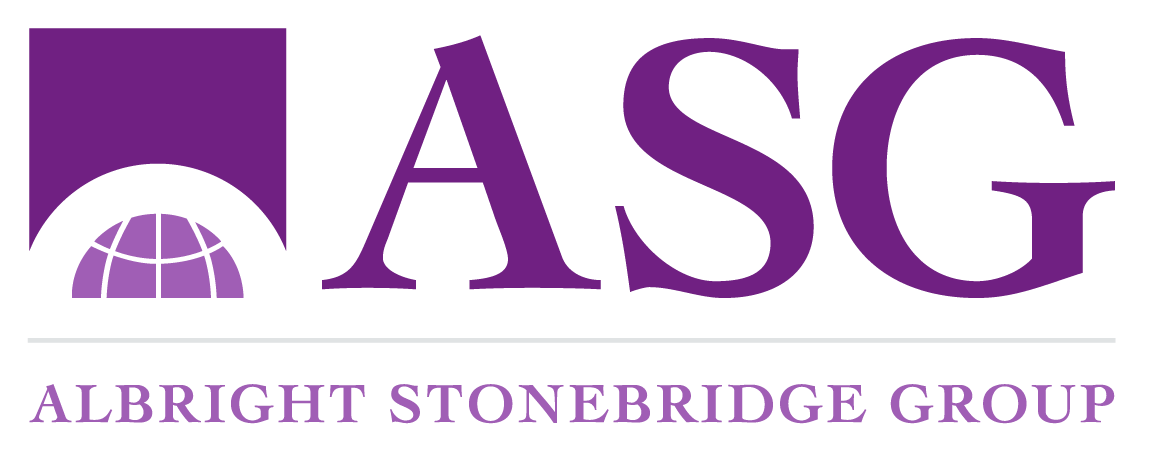
- Company type: Private
- Industry: International Strategic Consulting
- Predecessor: The Albright Group; Stonebridge International
- Founded: June 25, 2009; 16 years ago
- Headquarters: Washington, D.C., United States
- Area served: Worldwide
- Key people: Madeleine Albright (Chair)
- Website: albrightstonebridge.com

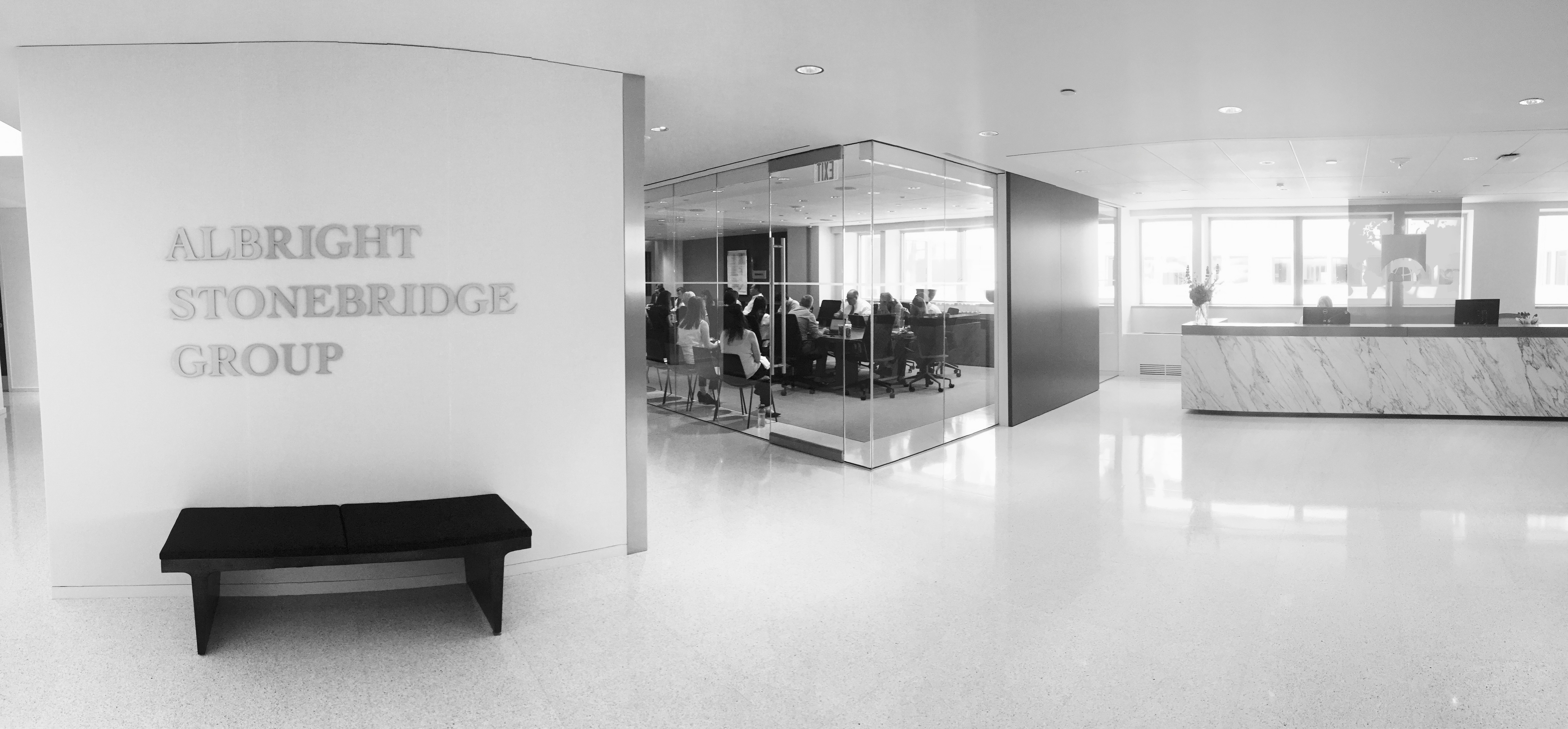
Albright Stonebridge Group's Washington, DC office lobby

Albright Stonebridge Group, part of DGA Group, is an American business strategy firm based in Washington, D.C., United States. It was created in 2009 through the merger of international consulting firms The Albright Group, founded in 2001 by former U.S. secretary of state Madeleine Albright, and Stonebridge International, founded in 2001 by former U.S. national security advisor Sandy Berger. In 2021, Albright Stonebridge Group became a founding member of Dentons Global Advisors. Dentons Global Advisors rebranded to DGA Group in 2024.

The firm advises clients on international policy and global markets. Its senior counselors include Joschka Fischer, James Steinberg, Pär Nuder, Carla Anderson Hills, and Thomas R. Pickering.

Several firm alumni joined the presidential administration of Joe Biden in 2021. The high concentration of officials entering from ASG and a relatively small number of similar firms worried some progressives over possible corporate influence on the administration.
