= Clayton County Courthouse (Iowa) =

- U.S. National Register of Historic Places
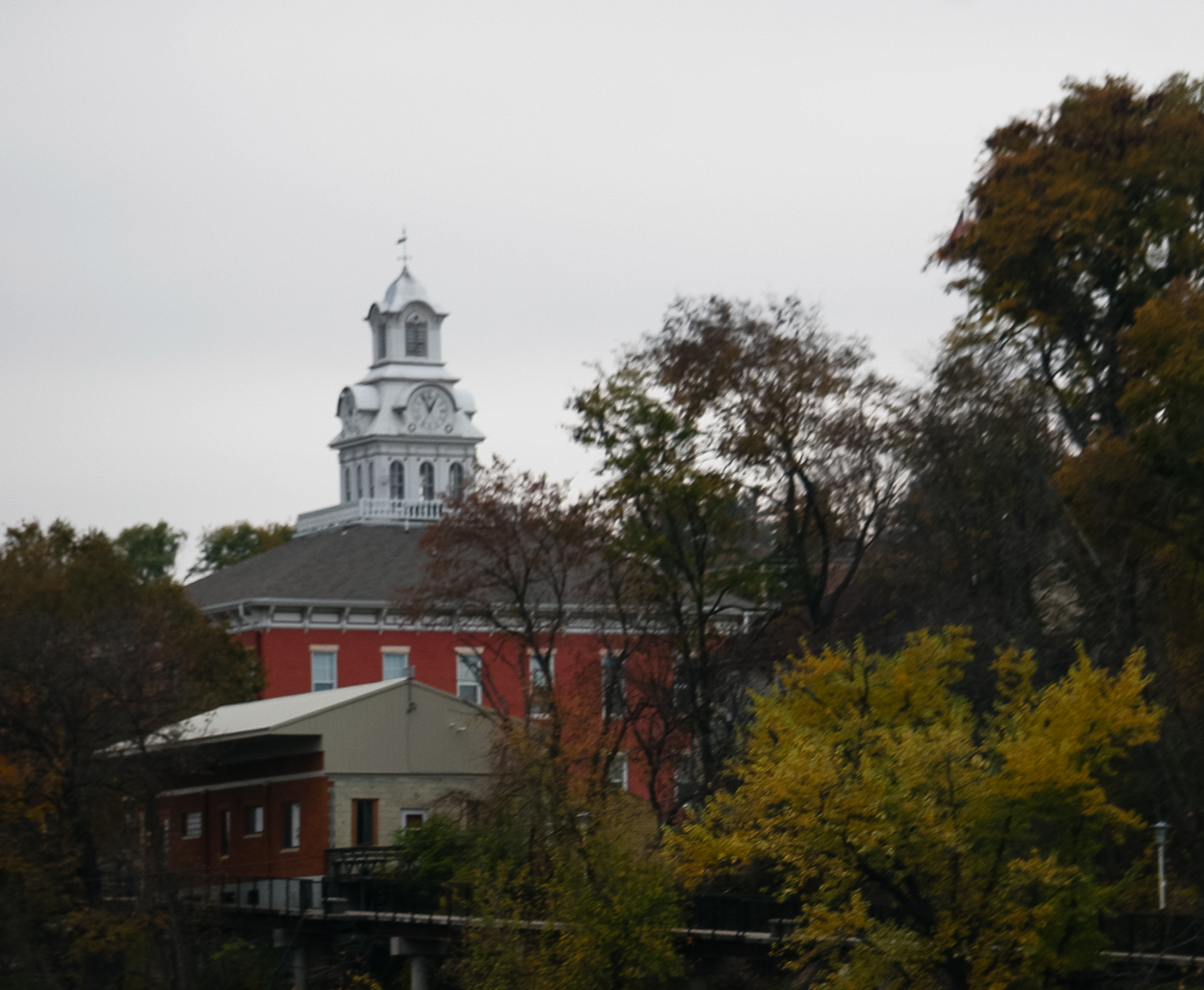
- The Clayton County courthouse in Elkader

- Location within Iowa Location within the United States
- Location: 111 High St. Elkader, Iowa
- Coordinates: 42°51′19″N 91°24′12″W
- Area: 1 acre (0.40 ha)
- Built: 1868, 1878
- Built by: O.F. Davis, Lyman Tyler; C.R. Moulton, A.E. Tyler
- Architectural style: Italianate
- MPS: County Courthouses in Iowa TR
- NRHP reference No.: 76000745
- Added to NRHP: October 8, 1976

The Clayton County Courthouse, located in Elkader, Iowa, United States, was built in 1878. It was listed on the National Register of Historic Places in 1976 as a part of the County Courthouses in Iowa Thematic Resource.

== History ==
The county seat in Clayton County moved several times between 1840 and 1876. It was located first in Prairie La Porte, then Jacksonville, followed by Garnavillo, Elkader, and Guttenberg. Eventually, Elkader won the right to be the county seat. A courthouse that was in Garnavillo was sold in 1866 to raise money for a new courthouse in Elkader. The board of supervisors was only willing to spend $2,000 a year to build the new structure. Because there was yet another contest in the works to consider the location of the county seat, the county and the town of Elkader came up with $10,000 to build the new courthouse.

The new courthouse is the first part of the present building that was completed in 1868, and measured 75 by 25 feet (22.9 by 7.6 m). The red brick structure featured a stone foundation, arched windows with finely dressed capstones, two offices on each floor, and two vaults between the downstairs offices. Ten years later a 75 by 50 feet (23 by 15 m) addition was built. This gave the building its present square form. The stone for the foundation was quarried locally, it had the same red brick, and the trim is wood painted white. The building, which follows the Italianate style, is capped with a hip roof. The two-stage clock tower was added in 1896. The tower is surrounded by an observation platform and it is capped with a black arrow weathervane. A new front entrance was added to the building in 1971. The double staircase on the interior is not original, but its banisters and newel posts are from the original.

== Civil War monument ==
The Civil War Monument was erected on the grounds in 1919. Located on the south side of the courthouse, it features a central tower with a plaque that contains an image of Abraham Lincoln and the text of his Gettysburg Address that is flanked by doric columns and capped with a bronze eagle. The tower is flanked by bronze bas relief panels that portray Civil War battles. On both ends of the Barre granite monument are 6-foot (1.8 m) bronze statues. One portrays an infantry soldier and the other a sailor. The monument measures 18.5 feet (5.6 m) long by 15 feet (4.6 m) high.
