= Elkader Keystone Bridge =

- U.S. National Register of Historic Places
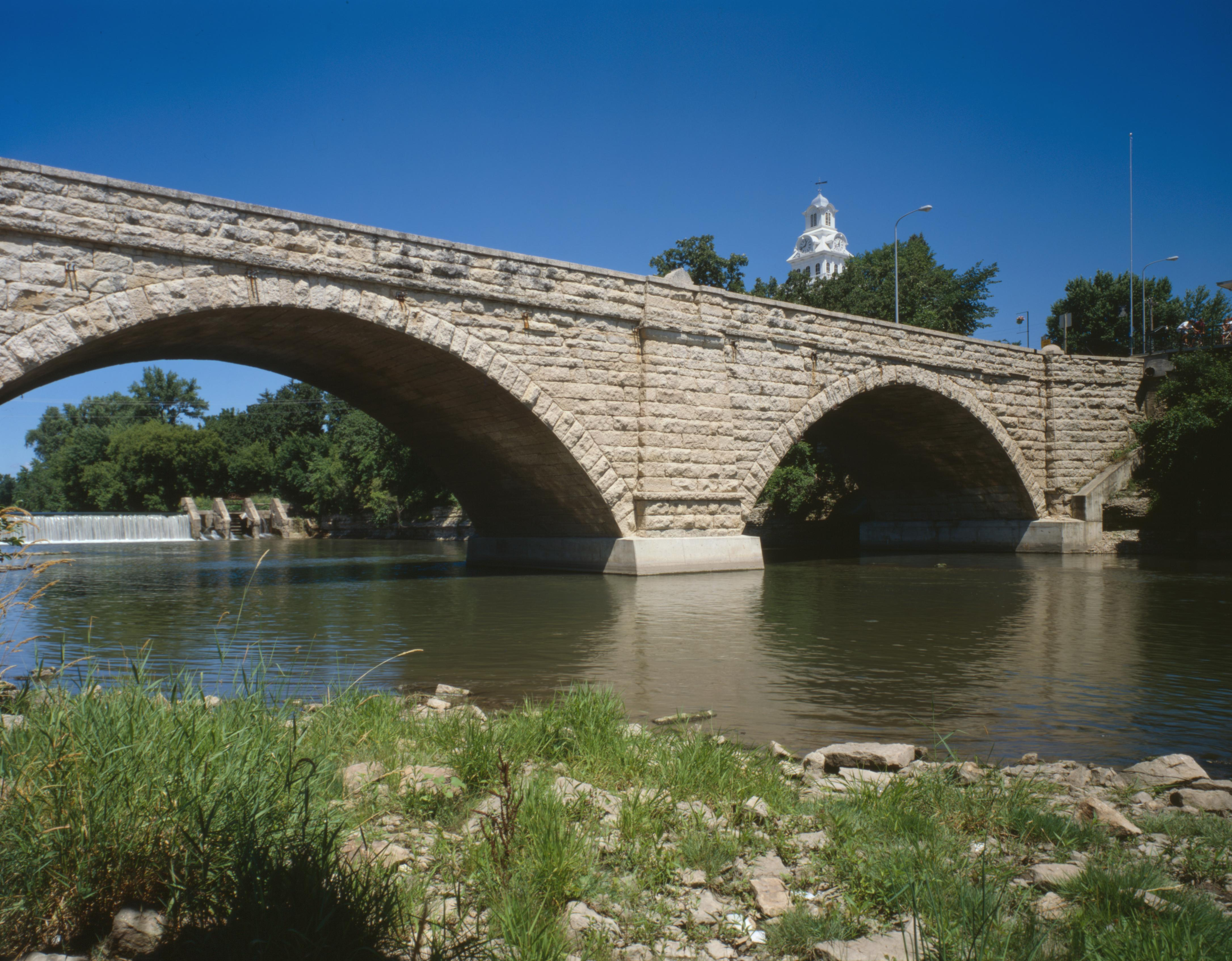

- Location within Iowa Location within the United States
- Location: Bridge Street; Elkader, Iowa
- Coordinates: 42°51′18″N 91°24′13″W
- Built: 1889
- Built by: Byrne and Blade
- Architect: M. Tschirgi
- Architectural style: Closed-spandrel deck arch bridge
- NRHP reference No.: 76000747
- Added to NRHP: November 7, 1976

The Elkader Keystone Bridge is a historic structure located in Elkader, Iowa, United States. The old iron truss bridge that crossed the Turkey River at this location was declared unsafe in 1888. The Clayton County Board of Supervisors decided to construct a bridge of native limestone as way of saving money and providing a reliable crossing. Engineer M. Tschirgi designed the structure and Dubuque stonemasons Byrne and Blade constructed the bridge. It was built at a cost of $16,282, and spans the river for 346 feet (105 m). This is one of the largest twin arched keystone bridges west of the Mississippi River. A sidewalk was added on the north side of the structure in 1924. The bridge was individually listed on the National Register of Historic Places in 1976.

== See also ==
- List of bridges documented by the Historic American Engineering Record in Iowa
