= Environmental contract =

Norms of acceptable environmental behaviour

An environmental contract is a way of expressing the rights and responsibilities of citizens, businesses and the state when it comes to the environment.

It is not known who invented the term. The British politician David Miliband used it when he was appointed Secretary of State for the Environment in May 2006, both in his blog, and in an article on the BBC News website. He initiated the launch of a wiki, to form an environmental contract. However, the site was edited heavily by Government officials, rendering pointless the exercise to interact with the public.

The term can be seen as an invitation to invite parallels with the idea of a social contract between workers, employers and the state which underpinned the foundation of the welfare state. Some have argued that, just as the social contract was a way of addressing social dislocation, so the environmental contract can be a way of addressing the environmental impacts which pose a threat to people and the planet in the 21st century.

== Environmental citizenship ==
Environmental citizenship (EC) is defined as the responsible pro-environmental behavior of citizens who act and participate in society as agents of change in the private and public sphere, on a local, national and global scale, through individual and collective actions, in the direction of solving contemporary environmental problems, preventing the creation of new environmental problems, achieving sustainability as well as developing a healthy relationship with nature.

Environmental citizenship includes the exercise of environmental rights and duties, as well as the identification of the underlying structural causes of environmental degradation and environmental problems, the development of the willingness and the competences for critical and active engagement and civic participation to address those structural causes, acting individually and collectively within democratic means, and taking into account inter- and intra-generational justice. Environmental citizenship is a key factor in EU's growth strategy (Europe 2020) and its vision for Sustainable Development, Green and Cycle economy and Low-carbon society (EU-roadmap 2050).

Because of its emphasis on rights and responsibilities, there are clear links between the environmental contract and notions of environmental citizenship. EC may shed light on the research of environmental contract into the way publics are built in everyday settings, if it is built firmly around the notions of justice, knowledge and language.

== Criticism ==
=== Sustainability justifiable in its own right ===
The idea can seem to boil down to a sort of 'I will if You will' type of idea. But action for sustainability, such as having regard for the needs of future generations (including addressing environmental impacts) is arguably justifiable in its own right. Similarly, if there is the view that action on climate change, for example, is urgent and imperative, then an 'I will, irrespective of what you do' approach might be argued as more responsible.

=== Further criticism ===
Some of the criticism of the idea of social contract would also seem to apply here.

== See also ==
- Environmental politics
