= Elkader, Iowa =

- City
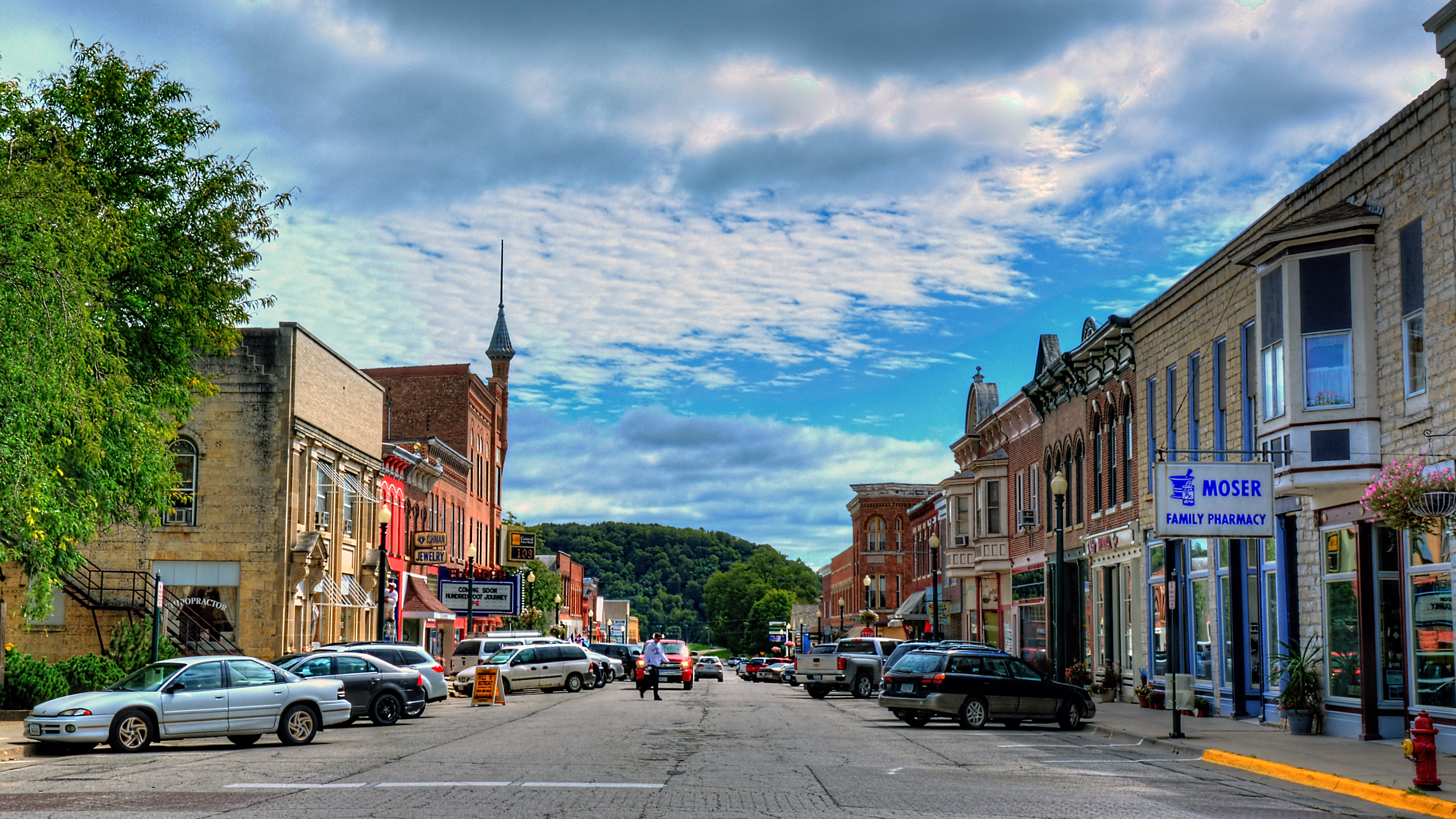
- Downtown Elkader
- Motto: Keystone of NE Iowa
- Location of Elkader, Iowa
- Coordinates: 42°51′27″N 91°24′10″W
- Country: United States
- State: Iowa
- County: Clayton
- Incorporated: 1846
- Named for: Emir Abdelkader

Area
  - Total: 1.37 sq mi (3.54 km^{2})
  - Land: 1.37 sq mi (3.54 km^{2})
  - Water: 0 sq mi (0.00 km^{2})
- Elevation: 814 ft (248 m)

Population (2020)
  - Total: 1,209
  - Density: 884.2/sq mi (341.39/km^{2})
- Time zone: UTC-6 (Central (CST))
  - Summer (DST): UTC-5 (CDT)
- ZIP code: 52043
- Area code: 563
- FIPS code: 19-24690
- GNIS feature ID: 2394652
- Website: elkader-iowa.com

Elkader /ɛlˈkeɪdər/ is a city in Clayton County, Iowa, United States. The population was 1,209 at the time of the 2020 census, down from 1,465 in 2000. It is the county seat of Clayton County. It is the site of Iowa's lowest recorded minimum temperature, −44 °C (−47 °F) on February 3, 1996.

== History ==
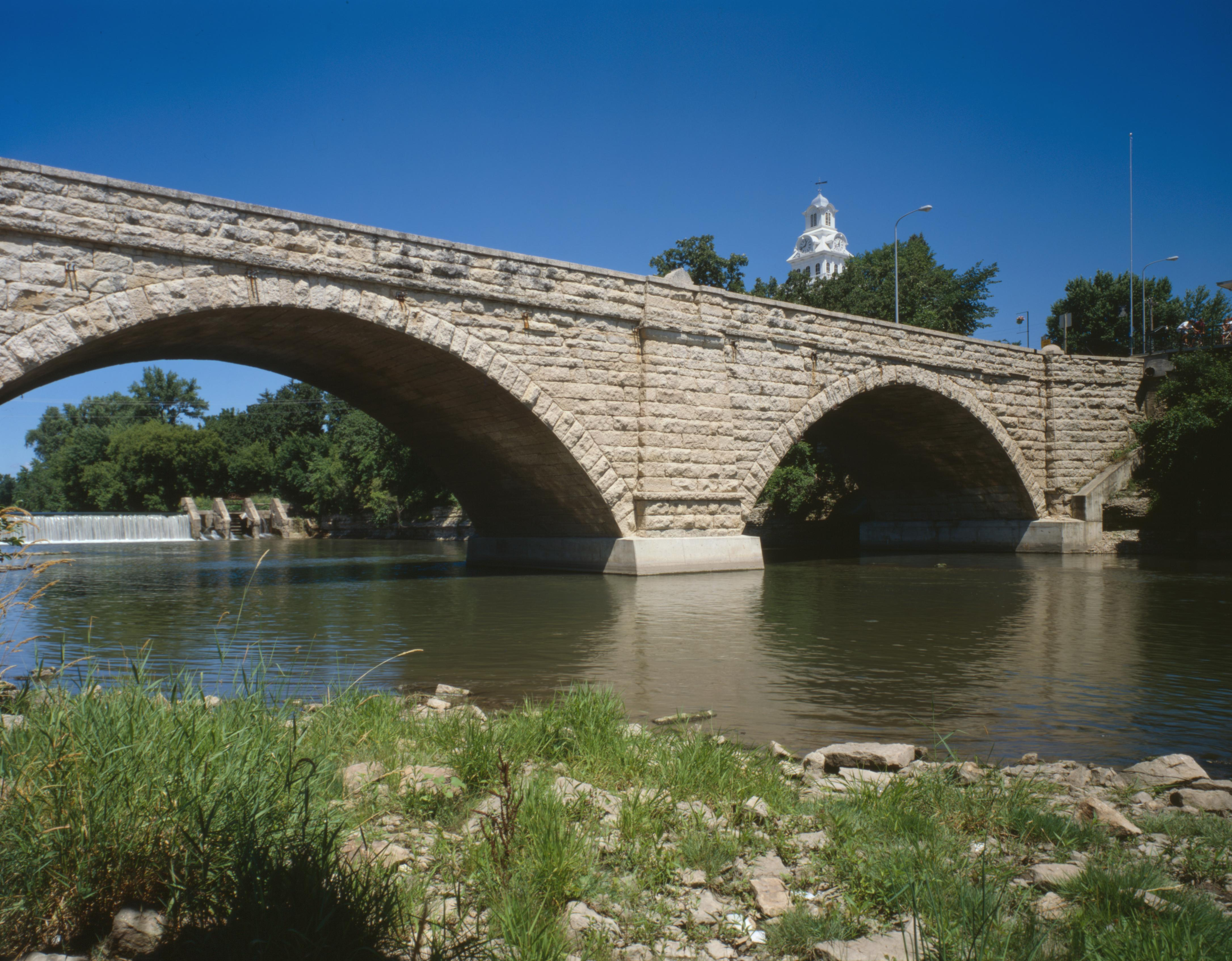
Elkader Keystone Bridge is listed on the NRHP

The city is named after a Muslim Algerian leader, the Emir Abdelkader. When the community was platted in 1846, the founders, Timothy Davis, John Thompson and Chester Sage decided to name it for the young Algerian who was leading his people in resisting the French conquest of Algeria.

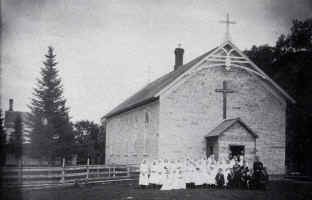
19th-century view of the original Saint Joseph's Church

The town is known for the Elkader Keystone Bridge over the Turkey River, said to be the largest stone arch bridge west of the Mississippi River. It, and many of the local buildings, are made from locally quarried sandstone. The town's grocery store, Wilke's, is the oldest continuously operated grocery store west of the Mississippi, as well. The city is also home to the renovated Victorian-era Elkader Opera House, and the Turkey River Mall, a 29-room hotel converted into antique stores.

== Geography ==
According to the United States Census Bureau, the city has a total area of 1.39 square miles (3.60 km^{2}), all land.

=== Climate ===
Climate data for Elkader 6 SSW, Iowa (1991–2020 normals, extremes 1893–1920, 1934–present)
Month	Jan	Feb	Mar	Apr	May	Jun	Jul	Aug	Sep	Oct	Nov	Dec	Year
Record high °F (°C)	64 (18)	74 (23)	88 (31)	92 (33)	95 (35)	103 (39)	111 (44)	108 (42)	102 (39)	94 (34)	79 (26)	70 (21)	111 (44)
Mean daily maximum °F (°C)	26.3 (−3.2)	31.0 (−0.6)	44.4 (6.9)	58.6 (14.8)	69.7 (20.9)	79.3 (26.3)	82.2 (27.9)	80.5 (26.9)	74.1 (23.4)	61.5 (16.4)	45.3 (7.4)	32.2 (0.1)	57.1 (13.9)
Daily mean °F (°C)	16.3 (−8.7)	20.6 (−6.3)	33.4 (0.8)	46.3 (7.9)	57.7 (14.3)	67.7 (19.8)	71.1 (21.7)	69.0 (20.6)	61.3 (16.3)	49.1 (9.5)	34.9 (1.6)	23.3 (−4.8)	45.9 (7.7)
Mean daily minimum °F (°C)	6.3 (−14.3)	10.1 (−12.2)	22.3 (−5.4)	34.1 (1.2)	45.7 (7.6)	56.0 (13.3)	60.0 (15.6)	57.6 (14.2)	48.5 (9.2)	36.6 (2.6)	24.5 (−4.2)	14.3 (−9.8)	34.7 (1.5)
Record low °F (°C)	−41 (−41)	−47 (−44)	−31 (−35)	−1 (−18)	19 (−7)	31 (−1)	35 (2)	30 (−1)	17 (−8)	7 (−14)	−22 (−30)	−34 (−37)	−47 (−44)
Average precipitation inches (mm)	1.25 (32)	1.28 (33)	2.03 (52)	4.00 (102)	4.65 (118)	6.67 (169)	4.60 (117)	3.92 (100)	3.63 (92)	2.92 (74)	2.28 (58)	1.57 (40)	38.80 (986)
Average snowfall inches (cm)	10.2 (26)	8.0 (20)	5.4 (14)	1.3 (3.3)	0.0 (0.0)	0.0 (0.0)	0.0 (0.0)	0.0 (0.0)	0.0 (0.0)	0.3 (0.76)	2.3 (5.8)	8.1 (21)	35.6 (90)
Average precipitation days (≥ 0.01 in)	7.9	7.4	8.4	10.6	12.4	11.9	9.5	9.5	9.5	9.0	7.3	8.5	111.9
Average snowy days (≥ 0.1 in)	6.2	5.3	3.1	0.9	0.0	0.0	0.0	0.0	0.0	0.3	1.5	5.4	22.7
Source: NOAA

== Demographics ==
Historical population

Year	Pop.	±%
1860	440	—
1870	697	+58.4%
1880	851	+22.1%
1890	745	−12.5%
1900	1,321	+77.3%
1910	1,181	−10.6%
1920	1,223	+3.6%
1930	1,382	+13.0%
1940	1,556	+12.6%

Year	Pop.	±%
1950	1,584	+1.8%
1960	1,526	−3.7%
1970	1,592	+4.3%
1980	1,688	+6.0%
1990	1,510	−10.5%
2000	1,465	−3.0%
2010	1,273	−13.1%
2020	1,209	−5.0%

Source: "U.S. Census website". United States Census Bureau.
U.S. Decennial Census

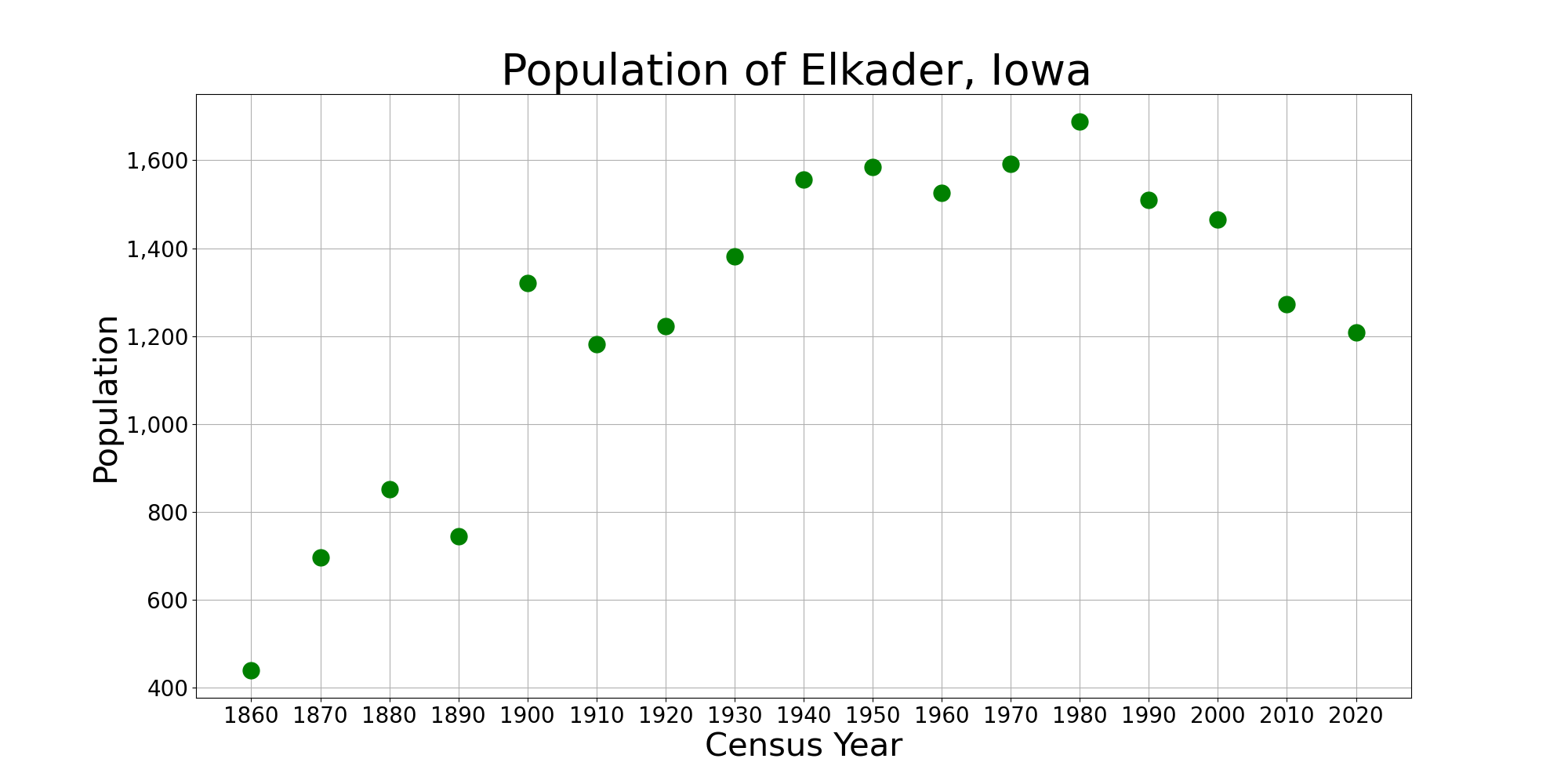
The population of Elkader, Iowa from US census data

=== 2020 census ===
As of the 2020 census, Elkader had a population of 1,209. The population density was 884.4 inhabitants per square mile (341.5/km^{2}). There were 653 housing units at an average density of 477.7 per square mile (184.4/km^{2}).

The median age was 50.8 years. 20.5% of residents were under the age of 18 and 30.0% were 65 years of age or older. For every 100 females there were 88.0 males, and for every 100 females age 18 and over there were 83.0 males age 18 and over.

There were 585 households, of which 22.6% had children under the age of 18 living in them. Of all households, 42.6% were married-couple households, 19.8% were households with a male householder and no spouse or partner present, and 31.1% were households with a female householder and no spouse or partner present. About 41.0% of all households were made up of individuals and 24.0% had someone living alone who was 65 years of age or older.

Of the city's housing units, 10.4% were vacant. The homeowner vacancy rate was 2.6% and the rental vacancy rate was 11.3%. 0.0% of residents lived in urban areas, while 100.0% lived in rural areas.

Racial composition as of the 2020 census
Race	Number	Percent
White	1,165	96.4%
Black or African American	6	0.5%
American Indian and Alaska Native	1	0.1%
Asian	1	0.1%
Native Hawaiian and Other Pacific Islander	1	0.1%
Some other race	8	0.7%
Two or more races	27	2.2%
Hispanic or Latino (of any race)	27	2.2%

=== 2010 census ===
At the 2010 census there were 1,273 people, 577 households, and 342 families living in the city. The population density was 915.8 inhabitants per square mile (353.6/km^{2}). There were 627 housing units at an average density of 451.1 per square mile (174.2/km^{2}). The racial makeup of the city was 98.7% White, 0.1% African American, 0.3% Native American, 0.2% Asian, and 0.7% from two or more races. Hispanic or Latino of any race were 0.3%.

Of the 577 households 23.6% had children under the age of 18 living with them, 50.6% were married couples living together, 5.9% had a female householder with no husband present, 2.8% had a male householder with no wife present, and 40.7% were non-families. 35.7% of households were one person and 16.8% were one person aged 65 or older. The average household size was 2.10 and the average family size was 2.73.

The median age was 49.8 years. 18.9% of residents were under the age of 18; 5.5% were between the ages of 18 and 24; 19% were from 25 to 44; 32.4% were from 45 to 64; and 24.4% were 65 or older. The gender makeup of the city was 46.2% male and 53.8% female.

=== 2000 census ===
At the 2000 census there were 1,465 people, 645 households, and 403 families living in the city. The population density was 1,049.0 inhabitants per square mile (405.0/km^{2}). There were 693 housing units at an average density of 496.2 per square mile (191.6/km^{2}). The racial makeup of the city was 99.25% White, 0.20% African American, 0.07% Native American, and 0.48% from two or more races. Hispanic or Latino of any race were 0.07%.

Of the 645 households 23.6% had children under the age of 18 living with them, 53.8% were married couples living together, 6.5% had a female householder with no husband present, and 37.4% were non-families. 35.0% of households were one person and 20.9% were one person aged 65 or older. The average household size was 2.16 and the average family size was 2.77.

20.6% are under the age of 18, 5.1% from 18 to 24, 23.5% from 25 to 44, 23.8% from 45 to 64, and 27.0% 65 or older. The median age was 45 years. For every 100 females, there were 80.4 males. For every 100 females age 18 and over, there were 77.6 males.

The median household income was $32,857 and the median family income was $41,830. Males had a median income of $28,235 versus $19,550 for females. The per capita income for the city was $16,785. About 2.7% of families and 5.2% of the population were below the poverty line, including 4.3% of those under age 18 and 8.5% of those age 65 or over.

== Education ==
The municipality is within the boundary of the Central Community School District.

== Notable people ==
- Timothy Davis, town founder and member of Congress for Iowa
- Jack Dittmer, Major League Baseball second baseman for the Boston/Milwaukee Braves and Detroit Tigers.
- Francis John Dunn, Roman Catholic bishop
- Asle Gronna, U.S. senator from North Dakota, 1911–1921
- Donald Harstad, novelist
- Leonard G. Wolf, U.S. representative from Iowa
- Heather Zichal, Former Deputy Assistant of Energy and Climate Change under Barack Obama

== Sister city ==
Elkader has one sister city, the city where Abdelkader was born, as designated by Sister Cities International:

- Mascara, Algeria

== See also ==
- Clayton County Courthouse
- St. Joseph's Catholic Church (Elkader, Iowa)
