= Steve Herman (EPA) =

Steve Herman was a senior administrator for the United States Environmental Protection Agency (EPA).

He is notable for playing an important role in several high-profile cases.

After leaving the EPA Herman became a director of Beveridge & Diamond.
