= List of United States representatives in the 63rd Congress =

This is a complete list of United States representatives during the 63rd United States Congress listed by seniority. For the most part, representatives are ranked by the beginning of their terms in office.

As an historical article, the districts and party affiliations listed reflect those during the 63rd Congress (March 4, 1913 – March 3, 1915). Seats and party affiliations on similar lists for other congresses will be different for certain members.

This article describes the criteria for seniority in the House of Representatives and sets out the list of members by seniority. It is prepared on the basis of the interpretation of seniority applied to the House of Representatives in the current congress. In the absence of information to the contrary, it is presumed that the twenty-first-century practice is identical to the seniority customs used during the 63rd Congress.

== Seniority ==
=== House seniority ===
Seniority in the House, for representatives with unbroken service, depends on the date on which the members first term began. That date is either the start of the Congress (4 March in odd numbered years, for the era up to and including the 73rd Congress starting in 1933) or the date of a special election during the Congress. Since many members start serving on the same day as others, ranking between them is based on alphabetical order by the last name of the representative.

Representatives who return to the House, after having previously served, are credited with service equal to one less than the total number of terms they served. When a representative has served a prior term of less than two terms (i.e., prior term minus one equals less than one), he is ranked above all others whose service begins on the same day.

=== Committee seniority ===
Until 1910, House committee members and chairmen were selected by the Speaker, who also ranked the members of the committee. Seniority on the committee was just one of the factors that was taken into account in ranking the members. In the 61st Congress, Speaker Cannon (R-IL) had used his power to change committee assignments to demote and punish insurgent Republicans. In March 1910 the Speaker was stripped of his powers over the composition of standing committees.

As a result of the events of 1910, at the start of the 63rd Congress in 1913, the committee assignments were made by each party and then formally approved by the whole House. Each party controlled the committee ranking of its members, but usually this followed the order of seniority of members in terms of service on the committee. It became customary for members of a committee, in the previous congress, to be re-appointed at the start of the next.

A seniority rule was normally used to decide committee chairmen, similar to that which the Senate had usually followed since 1846. The chairman was likely to be the majority member of a committee, with the longest continuous service on it. However, party leadership was typically not associated with seniority.

Out of the group of fifty three standing committee chairmen, at the start of this Congress, Nelson Polsby identified thirty three as the most senior member of the majority on the committee. In the other twenty cases, thirteen senior majority members were compensated for not being chairman of the committee (seven chaired another committee and six received better committee assignments than in the previous Congress). Thus only in seven instances was the seniority custom violated, without obvious compensation for the representative passed over.

== Committees ==
This list refers to the standing committees of the House in the 63rd Congress, the year of establishment as a standing committee (adoption of the name used in 1913), the number of members assigned to the committee and the corresponding committee in the current congress. Because of consolidation of committees and changes of jurisdiction, it is not always possible to identify a clear successor panel.

No.	1913 committee	Established	Members	2011 committee
1	Accounts	1805	11	House Administration
2	Agriculture	1820	21	Agriculture
3	Alcoholic Liquor Traffic	1893	11	Judiciary
4	Appropriations	1865	21	Appropriations
5	Banking and Currency	1865	21	Financial Services
6	Census	1901	16	Oversight and Government Reform
7	Claims	1794	16	Judiciary
8	Coinage, Weights and Measures	1864 (1867)	18	Financial Services
9	Disposition of Executive Papers	1911	2	House Administration
10	District of Columbia	1808	21	Oversight and Government Reform
11	Education	1867 (1883)	15	Education and the Workforce
12	Election of President, Vice President and Representatives	1893	13	House Administration
13	Elections No. 1	1789 (1895)	9	House Administration
14	Elections No. 2	1895	9	House Administration
15	Elections No. 3	1895	9	House Administration
16	Enrolled Bills	1876	7	House Administration
17	Expenditures in the Agriculture Department	1889	7	Oversight and Government Reform
18	Expenditures in the Interior Department	1860	7	Oversight and Government Reform
19	Expenditures in the Justice Department	1874	7	Oversight and Government Reform
20	Expenditures in the Navy Department	1816	7	Oversight and Government Reform
21	Expenditures in the Post Office Department	1816	7	Oversight and Government Reform
22	Expenditures in the State Department	1816	7	Oversight and Government Reform
23	Expenditures in the Treasury Department	1816	7	Oversight and Government Reform
24	Expenditures in the War Department	1816	7	Oversight and Government Reform
25	Expenditures on Public Buildings	1816	7	Oversight and Government Reform
26	Foreign Affairs	1822	21	Foreign Affairs
27	Immigration and Naturalization	1893	15	Judiciary
28	Indian Affairs	1821	21	Natural Resources
29	Industrial Arts and Expositions	1903	16	Foreign Affairs
30	Insular Affairs	1899	21	Natural Resources
31	Interstate and Foreign Commerce	1795 (1892)	21	Energy and Commerce
32	Invalid Pensions	1831	16	Veterans' Affairs
33	Irrigation of Arid Lands	1893	15	Natural Resources
34	Judiciary	1813	21	Judiciary
35	Labor	1883	13	Education and the Workforce
36	Merchant Marine and Fisheries	1887	21	...
37	Mileage	1837	5	House Administration
38	Military Affairs	1822	21	Armed Services
39	Mines and Mining	1865	14	Natural Resources
40	Naval Affairs	1822	21	Armed Services
41	Patents	1837	14	Judiciary
42	Pensions	1880	15	Veterans' Affairs
43	Post Office and Post Roads	1808	21	Oversight and Government Reform
44	Public Buildings and Grounds	1837	19	Transportation and Infrastructure
45	Public Lands	1805	21	Natural Resources
46	Railways and Canals	1831 (1869)	14	Transportation and Infrastructure
47	Reform in the Civil Service	1893	13	Oversight and Government Reform
48	Revision of Laws	1868	13	Judiciary
49	Rivers and Harbors	1883	21	Transportation and Infrastructure
50	Rules	1880	11	Rules
51	Territories	1825	16	Natural Resources
52	War Claims	1825 (1873)	15	Judiciary
53	Ways and Means	1802	21	Ways and Means
Joint Committees (House standing committee members only)
Jt 1	Library Joint	1806	5	House Administration
Jt 2	Printing Joint	1846	3	House Administration
New standing committees, established during the 63rd Congress
54	Expenditures in the Commerce Department	1903 (1913)	7	Oversight and Government Reform
55	Expenditures in the Labor Department	1913	7	Oversight and Government Reform
56	Roads	1913	21	Transportation and Infrastructure

== List of representatives by seniority ==
A numerical rank is assigned to each of the 435 members initially elected to the 63rd Congress. Other members, who joined the House during the Congress, are not assigned a number.

Three representatives-elect were not sworn in; of whom one died before the Congress started, one resigned to become a U.S. Senator and one was too ill to take his seat (before dying during the Congress). The list below includes the representatives-elect (with names in italics), with the seniority they would have held if they had been able to be sworn in.

Major party designations used in this article are D for Democratic members and R for Republican representatives. Other designations include Ind for Independent and Prog for Progressive.

U.S. House seniority
Rank	Representative	Party	District	Seniority date	Notes
Fifteen non-consecutive terms
1	Sereno E. Payne	R	NY-36	December 2, 1889	Previously served 1883-87 while serving in the House. Dean of the House. Died on December 10, 1914, while still serving in the House.
Twelve consecutive terms
2	William A. Jones	D	VA-1	March 4, 1891	Chairman: Insular Affairs. Dean of the House (1914).
Eleven consecutive terms
3	Richard Bartholdt	R	MO-10	March 4, 1893	Last term while serving in the House.
4	Henry A. Cooper	R	WI-1	March 4, 1893	
5	Frederick H. Gillett	R	MA-2	March 4, 1893	
Ten consecutive terms
6	Charles L. Bartlett	D	GA-6	March 4, 1895	Last term while serving in the House.
7	Stephen M. Sparkman	D	FL-1	March 4, 1895	Chairman: Rivers and Harbors
Ten non-consecutive terms
8	James B. (Champ) Clark	D	MO-9	March 4, 1897	Speaker of the House. Previously served 1893-95 while in the House.
9	Oscar W. Underwood	D	AL-9	March 4, 1897	Chairman: Ways and Means. Majority Leader. Previously served 1895-June 9, 1896. Last term while serving in the House.
Nine consecutive terms
10	William C. Adamson	D	GA-4	March 4, 1897	Chairman: Interstate and Foreign Commerce
11	Thomas S. Butler	R	PA-7	March 4, 1897	Ind R, 1897–99
12	Robert F. Broussard	D	LA-3	March 4, 1897	Chairman: Expenditures in the Justice Department; Last term while serving in the House.
13	Henry D. Clayton	D	AL-3	March 4, 1897	Chairman: Judiciary; Resigned to become a Judge: May 25, 1914
14	Edward L. Hamilton	R	MI-4	March 4, 1897	
15	James Hay	D	VA-7	March 4, 1897	Chairman: Military Affairs
16	Robert L. Henry	D	TX-11	March 4, 1897	Chairman: Rules
17	James R. Mann	R	IL-2	March 4, 1897	Minority Leader
18	John A. Moon	D	TN-3	March 4, 1897	Chairman: Post Office and Post Roads
19	Thetus W. Sims	D	TN-8	March 4, 1897	
20	James L. Slayden	D	TX-14	March 4, 1897	
21	Samuel W. Smith	R	MI-6	March 4, 1897	Last term while serving in the House.
22	John H. Stephens	D	TX-13	March 4, 1897	Chairman: Indian Affairs
23	Frederick C. Stevens	R	MN-4	March 4, 1897	Last term while serving in the House.
24	George W. Taylor	D	AL-1	March 4, 1897	Last term while serving in the House.
25	James T. Lloyd	D	MO-1	June 1, 1897	Chairman: Accounts
26	William S. Greene	R	MA-15	May 31, 1898	Republican Conference Chairman
Nine non-consecutive terms
27	Frank W. Mondell	R	WY-al	March 4, 1899	Previously served 1895-97 while in the House.
Eight consecutive terms
28	Albert S. Burleson	D	TX-10	March 4, 1899	Resigned, to become Postmaster General: March 6, 1913
29	John L. Burnett	D	AL-7	March 4, 1899	Chairman: Immigration and Naturalization
30	John J. Esch	R	WI-7	March 4, 1899	
31	David E. Finley	D	SC-5	March 4, 1899	
32	John J. Fitzgerald	D	NY-7	March 4, 1899	Chairman: Appropriations
33	Joseph W. Fordney	R	MI-8	March 4, 1899	
34	Gilbert N. Haugen	R	IA-4	March 4, 1899	
35	Ernest W. Roberts	R	MA-9	March 4, 1899	
36	William W. Rucker	D	MO-2	March 4, 1899	Chairman: Election of President, Vice President and Representatives
37	John H. Small	D	NC-1	March 4, 1899	
38	Dorsey W. Shackleford	D	MO-8	August 29, 1899	Chairman: Roads
39	William N. Richardson	D	AL-8	August 6, 1900	Chairman: Pensions. Died on March 31, 1914, while still serving in the House.
Seven consecutive terms
40	George F. Burgess	D	TX-9	March 4, 1901	
41	Ezekiel S. Candler, Jr.	D	MS-1	March 4, 1901	
42	Henry D. Flood	D	VA-10	March 4, 1901	Chairman: Foreign Affairs
43	Henry M. Goldfogle	D	NY-12	March 4, 1901	Chairman: Elections No. 3. Last term while serving in the House until 66th Congress.
44	James A. Hughes	R	WV-5	March 4, 1901	Last term while serving in the House until 70th Congress
45	Joseph T. Johnson	D	SC-4	March 4, 1901	
46	Claude Kitchin	D	NC-2	March 4, 1901	
47	Lemuel P. Padgett	D	TN-7	March 4, 1901	Chairman: Naval Affairs
48	Edward W. Pou	D	NC-4	March 4, 1901	Chairman: Claims
49	Asbury F. Lever	D	SC-7	November 5, 1901	Chairman: Agriculture
50	Augustus P. Gardner	R	MA-6	November 4, 1902	
51	Carter Glass	D	VA-6	November 4, 1902	Chairman: Banking and Currency
Seven non-consecutive terms
52	Charles H. Burke	R	SD-2	March 4, 1909	Previously served 1899–1907 while in the House. Minority Whip. Last term while serving in the House.
53	Julius Kahn	R	CA-4	March 4, 1905	Previously served 1899-1903 while in the House.
54	J. Frederick Talbott	D	MD-2	March 4, 1909	Previously served 1879-85 and 1893–95 while in the House
55	Eben W. Martin	R	SD-3	November 3, 1908	Previously served 1901–07. Last term while serving in the House.
Six consecutive terms
56	Wyatt Aiken	D	SC-3	March 4, 1903	
57	James A. Beall	D	TX-5	March 4, 1903	Last term while serving in the House.
58	Philip P. Campbell	R	KS-3	March 4, 1903	
59	Charles R. Davis	R	MN-3	March 4, 1903	
60	John N. Garner	D	TX-15	March 4, 1903	
61	Alexander W. Gregg	D	TX-7	March 4, 1903	Chairman: War Claims
62	Thomas W. Hardwick	D	GA-10	March 4, 1903	Chairman: Coinage, Weights and Measures; Resigned to become a U.S. Senator: November 2, 1914
63	Joseph Howell	R	UT-1	March 4, 1903	
64	William E. Humphrey	R	WA-1	March 4, 1903	
65	Benjamin G. Humphreys	D	MS-3	March 4, 1903	
66	Moses P. Kinkaid	R	NE-6	March 4, 1903	
67	George S. Legaré	D	SC-1	March 4, 1903	Died, as Representative-elect: January 31, 1913
68	Robert N. Page	D	NC-7	March 4, 1903	
69	Henry T. Rainey	D	IL-20	March 4, 1903	
70	J. Swagar Sherley	D	KY-5	March 4, 1903	
71	William R. Smith	D	TX-16	March 4, 1903	Chairman: Irrigation of Arid Lands
72	Augustus O. Stanley	D	KY-2	March 4, 1903	Last term while serving in the House.
73	Halvor Steenerson	R	MN-9	March 4, 1903	
74	Andrew J. Volstead	R	MN-7	March 4, 1903	
75	Edwin Y. Webb	D	NC-9	March 4, 1903	Chairman: Judiciary (1914)
76	H. Olin Young	R	MI-12	March 4, 1903	Resigned, during an election challenge, May 16, 1913
77	Victor Murdock	R	KS-8	May 26, 1903	Last term while serving in the House.
78	J. Thomas Heflin	D	AL-5	May 19, 1904	
79	Joseph R. Knowland	R	CA-11	November 8, 1904	Last term while serving in the House.
Six non-consecutive terms
80	Daniel J. Riordan	D	NY-11	November 6, 1906	Previously served 1899-1901 while in the House.
Five consecutive terms
81	Andrew J. Barchfeld	R	PA-32	March 4, 1905	
82	Thomas M. Bell	D	GA-9	March 4, 1905	Majority Whip
83	James F. Burke	R	PA-31	March 4, 1905	Last term while serving in the House.
84	William M. Calder	R	NY-6	March 4, 1905	Last term while serving in the House.
85	Frank Clark	D	FL-2	March 4, 1905	Chairman: Public Buildings and Grounds
86	Lincoln Dixon	D	IN-4	March 4, 1905	
87	John C. Floyd	D	AR-3	March 4, 1905	
88	Finis J. Garrett	D	TN-9	March 4, 1905	
89	Everis A. Hayes	R	CA-8	March 4, 1905	
90	William C. Houston	D	TN-5	March 4, 1905	Chairman: Territories
91	Gordon Lee	D	GA-7	March 4, 1905	
92	Martin B. Madden	R	IL-1	March 4, 1905	
93	John T. Watkins	D	LA-4	March 4, 1905	Chairman: Revision of Laws
94	John W. Weeks	R	MA-13	March 4, 1905	Representative-elect resigned, to become a U.S. Senator: March 4, 1913
95	John M. Nelson	R	WI-3	September 4, 1906	
96	J. Hampton Moore	R	PA-3	November 6, 1906	
97	Edward W. Saunders	D	VA-5	November 6, 1906	
Five non-consecutive terms
98	Burton L. French	R	ID-al	March 4, 1911	Previously served 1903-09 while in the House. Last term while serving in the House until 65th Congress.
99	Joseph A. Goulden	D	NY-23	March 4, 1913	Previously served 1903-11 while in the House.
100	Courtney W. Hamlin	D	MO-7	March 4, 1907	Previously served 1903-05 while in the House. Chairman: Expenditures in the State Department.
101	Francis B. Harrison	D	NY-20	March 4, 1907	Previously served 1903-05 while in the House. Resigned on September 1, 1913, while still serving in the House.
102	Isaac R. Sherwood	D	OH-9	March 4, 1907	Previously served (R) 1873-75 while in the House. Chairman: Invalid Pensions.
103	William H. Stafford	R	WI-5	March 4, 1913	Previously served 1903-11 while in the House.
104	Frank E. Wilson	D	NY-3	March 4, 1911	Previously served 1899-1905 while in the House. Last term while serving in the House.
105	Charles F. Booher	D	MO-4	March 4, 1907	Previously served February 18-March 3, 1889, while in the House.
Four consecutive terms
106	John A. M. Adair	D	IN-8	March 4, 1907	Chairman: Expenditures in the War Department
107	Joshua W. Alexander	D	MO-3	March 4, 1907	Chairman: Merchant Marine and Fisheries
108	Timothy T. Ansberry	D	OH-5	March 4, 1907	Resigned, to become a Judge: January 9, 1915
109	William A. Ashbrook	D	OH-17	March 4, 1907	
110	William J. Cary	R	WI-4	March 4, 1907	
111	William E. Cox	D	IN-3	March 4, 1907	
112	Charles G. Edwards	D	GA-1	March 4, 1907	
113	George W. Fairchild	R	NY-34	March 4, 1907	
114	Martin D. Foster	D	IL-23	March 4, 1907	Chairman: Mines and Mining
115	Hannibal L. Godwin	D	NC-6	March 4, 1907	Chairman: Reform in the Civil Service
116	James A. Hamill	D	NJ-12	March 4, 1907	Chairman: Elections No. 2
117	Winfield S. Hammond	D	MN-2	March 4, 1907	Resigned, to become Governor: January 6, 1915
118	Rufus Hardy	D	TX-6	March 4, 1907	Chairman: Expenditures in the Navy Department
119	Willis C. Hawley	R	OR-1	March 4, 1907	
120	Harvey Helm	D	KY-8	March 4, 1907	Chairman: Census
121	Richmond P. Hobson	D	AL-6	March 4, 1907	Last term while serving in the House.
122	Cordell Hull	D	TN-4	March 4, 1907	
123	Ben Johnson	D	KY-4	March 4, 1907	Chairman: District of Columbia
124	Charles A. Kennedy	R	IA-1	March 4, 1907	
125	John W. Langley	R	KY-10	March 4, 1907	
126	Charles A. Lindbergh	R	MN-6	March 4, 1907	
127	James T. McDermott	D	IL-4	March 4, 1907	Resigned on July 21, 1914, while still serving in the House. Last term while serving in the House until 64th Congress.
128	James C. McLaughlin	R	MI-9	March 4, 1907	
129	Andrew J. Peters	D	MA-11	March 4, 1907	Resigned on August 15, 1914, while still serving in the House.
130	George W. Rauch	D	IN-11	March 4, 1907	
131	John H. Rothermel	D	PA-13	March 4, 1907	Chairman: Expenditures in the Commerce Department. Last term while serving in the House.
132	Adolph J. Sabath	D	IL-5	March 4, 1907	Chairman: Alcoholic Liquor Traffic
133	Daniel R. Anthony, Jr.	R	KS-1	May 23, 1907	
134	Charles C. Carlin	D	VA-8	November 5, 1907	
135	Charles D. Carter	D	OK-4	November 16, 1907	
136	Scott Ferris	D	OK-5	November 16, 1907	Chairman: Public Lands
137	Bird S. McGuire	R	OK-1	November 16, 1907	Previously served as Delegate 1903–07 while in the House. Last term while serving in the House.
138	C. Bascom Slemp	R	VA-9	December 17, 1907	
139	Henry A. Barnhart	D	IN-13	November 3, 1908	
140	Albert Estopinal	D	LA-1	November 3, 1908	
141	Frank E. Guernsey	R	ME-4	November 3, 1908	
Four non-consecutive terms
142	James M. Gudger, Jr.	D	NC-10	March 4, 1911	Previously served 1903–07 while in the House. Chairman: Expenditures in the Post Office Department (1914). Last term while serving in the House.
Three consecutive terms
143	Richard W. Austin	R	TN-2	March 4, 1909	
144	William P. Borland	D	MO-5	March 4, 1909	
145	Joseph W. Byrns	D	TN-6	March 4, 1909	
146	J. Campbell Cantrill	D	KY-7	March 4, 1909	
147	Cyrus Cline	D	IN-12	March 4, 1909	
148	James W. Collier	D	MS-8	March 4, 1909	
149	Michael F. Conry	D	NY-15	March 4, 1909	
150	James H. Covington	D	MD-1	March 4, 1909	Resigned to become a Judge: September 30, 1914
151	William A. Cullop	D	IN-2	March 4, 1909	
152	S. Hubert Dent, Jr.	D	AL-2	March 4, 1909	
153	Martin Dies	D	TX-2	March 4, 1909	Chairman: Railways and Canals
154	Daniel A. Driscoll	D	NY-42	March 4, 1909	
155	Thomas Gallagher	D	IL-8	March 4, 1909	
156	James W. Good	R	IA-5	March 4, 1909	
157	James M. Graham	D	IL-21	March 4, 1909	Chairman: Expenditures in the Interior Department; Last term while serving in the House.
158	William W. Griest	R	PA-9	March 4, 1909	
159	Dudley M. Hughes	D	GA-12	March 4, 1909	Chairman: Education
160	Eugene F. Kinkead	D	NJ-8	March 4, 1909	Resigned on February 4, 1915, while still serving in the House.
161	Charles A. Korbly	D	IN-7	March 4, 1909	Last term while serving in the House.
162	Jonathan N. Langham	R	PA-27	March 4, 1909	Last term while serving in the House.
163	Irvine L. Lenroot	R	WI-11	March 4, 1909	
164	John A. Maguire	D	NE-1	March 4, 1909	Last term while serving in the House.
165	Clarence B. Miller	R	MN-8	March 4, 1909	
166	Dick T. Morgan	R	OK-2	March 4, 1909	
167	Martin A. Morrison	D	IN-9	March 4, 1909	
168	Ralph W. Moss	D	IN-5	March 4, 1909	
169	William A. Oldfield	D	AR-2	March 4, 1909	Chairman: Patents
170	A. Mitchell Palmer	D	PA-26	March 4, 1909	Democratic Caucus Chairman. Last term while serving in the House.
171	Frank Plumley	R	VT-2	March 4, 1909	Last term while serving in the House.
172	William G. Sharp	D	OH-14	March 4, 1909	Resigned on July 23, 1914, while still serving in the House.
173	Thomas U. Sisson	D	MS-4	March 4, 1909	
174	Edward T. Taylor	D	CO-al	March 4, 1909	
175	Robert Y. Thomas, Jr.	D	KY-3	March 4, 1909	
176	Frank P. Woods	R	IA-10	March 4, 1909	
177	Clement C. Dickinson	D	MO-6	February 1, 1910	
178	Seaborn Roddenbery	D	GA-2	February 6, 1910	Died September 25, 1913, while still serving in the House
179	H. Garland Dupré	D	LA-2	November 8, 1910	
Three non-consecutive terms
180	Jefferson M. Levy	D	NY-14	March 4, 1911	Previously served 1899–1901 while in the House. Last term while serving in the House.
181	Joseph J. Russell	D	MO-14	March 4, 1911	Previously served 1907-09 while in the House.
182	James S. Davenport	D	OK-3	March 4, 1911	Previously served November 16, 1907–09 while in the House.
183	Timothy D. Sullivan	D	NY-13	March 4, 1913	Previously served 1903-July 27, 1906, while in the House. Representative-elect, died: August 31, 1913.
Two consecutive terms
184	Alfred G. Allen	D	OH-2	March 4, 1911	
185	Sydney Anderson	R	MN-1	March 4, 1911	
186	Elsworth R. Bathrick	D	OH-19	March 4, 1911	Last term while serving in the House until 65th Congress
187	Fred L. Blackmon	D	AL-4	March 4, 1911	
188	William G. Brown, Jr.	D	WV-2	March 4, 1911	
189	Frank Buchanan	D	IL-7	March 4, 1911	
190	Robert J. Bulkley	D	OH-21	March 4, 1911	Last term while serving in the House.
191	Michael E. Burke	D	WI-2	March 4, 1911	
192	James F. Byrnes	D	SC-2	March 4, 1911	
193	Oscar Callaway	D	TX-12	March 4, 1911	
194	Horatio C. Claypool	D	OH-11	March 4, 1911	Last term while serving in the House until 65th Congress
195	Ira C. Copley	R	IL-11	March 4, 1911	
196	James M. Curley	D	MA-12	March 4, 1911	Resigned on February 4, 1914, while still serving in the House. Last term while serving in the House until 78th Congress.
197	Henry G. Danforth	R	NY-39	March 4, 1911	
198	John W. Davis	D	WV-1	March 4, 1911	Resigned on August 29, 1913, while still serving in the House.
199	Robert E. Difenderfer	D	PA-8	March 4, 1911	Last term while serving in the House.
200	Michael Donohoe	D	PA-5	March 4, 1911	Last term while serving in the House.
201	Frank E. Doremus	D	MI-1	March 4, 1911	
202	Robert L. Doughton	D	NC-8	March 4, 1911	Chairman: Expenditures in the Agriculture Department
203	Leonidas C. Dyer	R	MO-12	March 4, 1911	Unseated June 19, 1914. Last term while serving in the House until 64th Congress.
204	John M. Faison	D	NC-3	March 4, 1911	Last term while serving in the House.
205	John R. Farr	R	PA-10	March 4, 1911	
206	William J. Fields	D	KY-9	March 4, 1911	
207	H. Robert Fowler	D	IL-24	March 4, 1911	Last term while serving in the House.
208	William B. Francis	D	OH-16	March 4, 1911	Last term while serving in the House.
209	Henry George, Jr.	D	NY-21	March 4, 1911	Last term while serving in the House.
210	J. Henry Goeke	D	OH-4	March 4, 1911	Last term while serving in the House.
211	William S. Goodwin	D	AR-7	March 4, 1911	
212	Finly H. Gray	D	IN-6	March 4, 1911	
213	Pat Harrison	D	MS-6	March 4, 1911	
214	Henry T. Helgesen	R	ND-1	March 4, 1911	
215	Walter L. Hensley	D	MO-13	March 4, 1911	
216	Asher C. Hinds	R	ME-1	March 4, 1911	
217	Edward E. Holland	D	VA-2	March 4, 1911	
218	William S. Howard	D	GA-5	March 4, 1911	
219	Henderson M. Jacoway	D	AR-5	March 4, 1911	
220	William Kent	Ind	CA-1	March 4, 1911	
221	George Konig	D	MD-3	March 4, 1911	Died on May 31, 1913, while still serving in the House.
222	Thomas F. Konop	D	WI-9	March 4, 1911	Chairman: Expenditure on Public Buildings
223	Walter Lafferty	R	OR-3	March 4, 1911	Last term while serving in the House.
224	William L. La Follette	R	WA-3	March 4, 1911	
225	Robert E. Lee	D	PA-12	March 4, 1911	Last term while serving in the House.
226	David J. Lewis	D	MD-6	March 4, 1911	Chairman: Labor
227	J. Charles Linthicum	D	MD-4	March 4, 1911	
228	Charles O. Lobeck	D	NE-2	March 4, 1911	Chairman: Expenditures in the Treasury Department
229	James P. Maher	D	NY-5	March 4, 1911	Chairman: Expenditures in the Labor Department
230	Walter I. McCoy	D	NJ-9	March 4, 1911	Resigned on October 3, 1914, while still serving in the House.
231	Daniel J. McGillicuddy	D	ME-2	March 4, 1911	
232	John C. McKenzie	R	IL-13	March 4, 1911	
233	Luther W. Mott	R	NY-32	March 4, 1911	
234	William F. Murray	D	MA-10	March 4, 1911	Resigned on September 28, 1914, while still serving in the House.
235	George F. O'Shaunessy	D	RI-1	March 4, 1911	
236	Thomas G. Patten	D	NY-18	March 4, 1911	
237	Charles E. Patton	R	PA-21	March 4, 1911	Last term while serving in the House.
238	Irvin S. Pepper	D	IA-2	March 4, 1911	Chairman: Expenditures in the Post Office Department; Died on December 22, 1913, while still serving in the House.
239	Stephen G. Porter	R	PA-29	March 4, 1911	
240	James D. Post	D	OH-7	March 4, 1911	Chairman: Elections No. 1. Last term while serving in the House.
241	Caleb Powers	R	KY-11	March 4, 1911	
242	Solomon F. Prouty	R	IA-7	March 4, 1911	Last term while serving in the House.
243	John E. Raker	D	CA-2	March 4, 1911	
244	Thomas L. Reilly	D	CT-3	March 4, 1911	Last term while serving in the House.
245	Edwin E. Roberts	R	NV-al	March 4, 1911	
246	Arthur B. Rouse	D	KY-6	March 4, 1911	
247	Thomas L. Rubey	D	MO-16	March 4, 1911	
248	Thomas J. Scully	D	NJ-3	March 4, 1911	
249	Sam R. Sells	R	TN-1	March 4, 1911	
250	Charles H. Sloan	R	NE-4	March 4, 1911	
251	Charles B. Smith	D	NY-41	March 4, 1911	
252	John M. C. Smith	R	MI-3	March 4, 1911	
253	Charles M. Stedman	D	NC-5	March 4, 1911	
254	Hubert D. Stephens	D	MS-2	March 4, 1911	
255	William Stephens	Prog	CA-10	March 4, 1911	
256	Claude U. Stone	D	IL-16	March 4, 1911	
257	Robert M. Switzer	R	OH-10	March 4, 1911	
258	Charles A. Talcott	D	NY-33	March 4, 1911	Last term while serving in the House.
259	Horace M. Towner	R	IA-8	March 4, 1911	
260	Edward W. Townsend	D	NJ-10	March 4, 1911	Last term while serving in the House.
261	Samuel J. Tribble	D	GA-8	March 4, 1911	
262	William E. Tuttle, Jr.	D	NJ-5	March 4, 1911	Last term while serving in the House.
263	Edwin S. Underhill	D	NY-37	March 4, 1911	Chairman: Industrial Arts and Expositions. Last term while serving in the House.
264	John J. Whitacre	D	OH-18	March 4, 1911	Last term while serving in the House.
265	George White	D	OH-15	March 4, 1911	Last term while serving in the House until 65th Congress
266	William H. Wilder	R	MA-3	March 4, 1911	Died on September 11, 1913, while still serving in the House.
267	Frank B. Willis	R	OH-8	March 4, 1911	Resigned, to become Governor: January 9, 1915
268	Samuel A. Witherspoon	D	MS-5	March 4, 1911	
269	James Young	D	TX-3	March 4, 1911	
270	William R. Green	R	IA-9	June 5, 1911	
271	William D. B. Ainey	R	PA-14	November 7, 1911	Last term while serving in the House.
272	William J. Browning	R	NJ-1	November 7, 1911	
273	Kenneth McKellar	D	TN-10	November 7, 1911	
274	Dan V. Stephens	D	NE-3	November 7, 1911	
275	Joseph Taggart	D	KS-2	November 7, 1911	
276	Harvey B. Fergusson	D	NM-al	January 8, 1912	Previously served as Delegate 1897–99 while in the House. Last term while serving in the House.
277	George A. Neeley	D	KS-7	January 9, 1912	Last term while serving in the House.
278	Carl T. Hayden	D	AZ-al	February 19, 1912	
279	William S. Vare	R	PA-1	May 24, 1912	
280	Frank L. Greene	R	VT-1	July 30, 1912	
281	Edwin A. Merritt	R	NY-31	November 5, 1912	Died December 4, 1914, while still serving in the House.
282	Lewis L. Morgan	D	LA-6	November 5, 1912	
283	George C. Scott	R	IA-11	November 5, 1912	Last term while serving in the House until 65th Congress
284	Samuel M. Taylor	D	AR-6	January 15, 1913	
Two non-consecutive terms
285	James McAndrews	D	IL-6	March 4, 1913	Previously served 1901-03 while in the House.
286	William E. Williams	D	IL-al	March 4, 1913	Previously served 1899-1901 while in the House.
287	Charles R. Crisp	D	GA-3	March 4, 1913	Previously served 1896-97 while in the House.
One term
288	John W. Abercrombie	D	AL-al	March 4, 1913	
289	James B. Aswell	D	LA-8	March 4, 1913	
290	Samuel B. Avis	R	WV-3	March 4, 1913	Only term while serving in the House.
291	Warren W. Bailey	D	PA-19	March 4, 1913	Chairman: Mileage
292	J. Thompson Baker	D	NJ-2	March 4, 1913	Only term while serving in the House.
293	William N. Baltz	D	IL-22	March 4, 1913	Only term while serving in the House.
294	Alben W. Barkley	D	KY-1	March 4, 1913	
295	Silas R. Barton	R	NE-5	March 4, 1913	Only term while serving in the House.
296	Samuel W. Beakes	D	MI-2	March 4, 1913	
297	Charles W. Bell	Prog	CA-9	March 4, 1913	Only term while serving in the House.
298	Charles M. Borchers	D	IL-19	March 4, 1913	Only term while serving in the House.
299	Stanley E. Bowdle	D	OH-1	March 4, 1913	Only term while serving in the House.
300	Robert G. Bremner	D	NJ-7	March 4, 1913	Died on February 5, 1914, while still serving in the House.
301	Frederick A. Britten	R	IL-9	March 4, 1913	
302	Franklin Brockson	D	DE-al	March 4, 1913	Only term while serving in the House.
303	Andrew R. Brodbeck	D	PA-20	March 4, 1913	Only term while serving in the House until 65th Congress
304	Lathrop Brown	D	NY-1	March 4, 1913	Only term while serving in the House.
305	Edward E. Browne	R	WI-8	March 4, 1913	
306	Henry Bruckner	D	NY-22	March 4, 1913	
307	Clement L. Brumbaugh	D	OH-12	March 4, 1913	
308	James W. Bryan	Prog	WA-al	March 4, 1913	Only term while serving in the House.
309	Thaddeus H. Caraway	D	AR-1	March 4, 1913	
310	John F. Carew	D	NY-17	March 4, 1913	
311	Wooda N. Carr	R	PA-23	March 4, 1913	
312	John J. Casey	D	PA-11	March 4, 1913	
313	Walter M. Chandler	Prog	NY-19	March 4, 1913	
314	Denver S. Church	D	CA-7	March 4, 1913	
315	John R. Clancy	D	NY-35	March 4, 1913	Only term while serving in the House.
316	John R. Connelly	D	KS-6	March 4, 1913	
317	Maurice Connolly	D	IA-3	March 4, 1913	Only term while serving in the House.
318	Louis C. Cramton	R	MI-7	March 4, 1913	
319	Robert Crosser	D	OH-al	March 4, 1913	
320	Charles F. Curry	R	CA-3	March 4, 1913	
321	Harry H. Dale	D	NY-4	March 4, 1913	
322	Perl D. Decker	D	MO-15	March 4, 1913	
323	Frederick S. Deitrick	D	MA-8	March 4, 1913	Only term while serving in the House.
324	Franklin L. Dershem	D	PA-17	March 4, 1913	Only term while serving in the House.
325	Charles H. Dillon	R	SD-1	March 4, 1913	
326	Jeremiah Donovan	D	CT-4	March 4, 1913	Only term while serving in the House.
327	Peter J. Dooling	D	NY-16	March 4, 1913	
328	Dudley Doolittle	D	KS-4	March 4, 1913	
329	Thomas B. Dunn	R	NY-38	March 4, 1913	
330	John J. Eagan	D	NJ-11	March 4, 1913	
331	Joe H. Eagle	D	TX-8	March 4, 1913	
332	George W. Edmonds	R	PA-4	March 4, 1913	
333	J. Walter Elder	D	LA-5	March 4, 1913	Only term while serving in the House.
334	John M. Evans	D	MT-al	March 4, 1913	
335	Jacob Falconer	Prog	WA-al	March 4, 1913	Only term while serving in the House.
336	Simeon D. Fess	R	OH-6	March 4, 1913	
337	Louis Fitzhenry	D	IL-17	March 4, 1913	Only term while serving in the House.
338	James A. Frear	R	WI-10	March 4, 1913	
339	Warren Gard	D	OH-3	March 4, 1913	
340	Daniel E. Garrett	D	TX-al	March 4, 1913	Only term while serving in the House until 65th Congress
341	Peter G. Gerry	D	RI-2	March 4, 1913	Only term while serving in the House.
342	Edward Gilmore	D	MA-14	March 4, 1913	Only term while serving in the House.
343	Robert H. Gittins	D	NY-40	March 4, 1913	Only term while serving in the House.
344	Forrest Goodwin	R	ME-3	March 4, 1913	Died on May 28, 1913, while still serving in the House.
345	William Gordon	D	OH-20	March 4, 1913	
346	George E. Gorman	D	IL-3	March 4, 1913	Only term while serving in the House.
347	George S. Graham	R	PA-2	March 4, 1913	
348	Daniel J. Griffin	D	NY-8	March 4, 1913	
349	Charles M. Hamilton	R	NY-43	March 4, 1913	
350	Guy T. Helvering	D	KS-5	March 4, 1913	
351	Robert P. Hill	D	IL-25	March 4, 1913	Only term while serving in the House until 75th Congress
352	William H. Hinebaugh	Prog	IL-12	March 4, 1913	Only term while serving in the House.
353	Stephen A. Hoxworth	D	IL-15	March 4, 1913	Only term while serving in the House.
354	Willis J. Hulings	Prog	PA-28	March 4, 1913	Only term while serving in the House until 66th Congress
355	William L. Igoe	D	MO-11	March 4, 1913	
356	Albert Johnson	R	WA-2	March 4, 1913	
357	Jacob Johnson	R	UT-2	March 4, 1913	Only term while serving in the House.
358	Edward Keating	D	CO-al	March 4, 1913	
359	Abraham L. Keister	R	PA-22	March 4, 1913	
360	Patrick H. Kelley	R	MI-al	March 4, 1913	
361	M. Clyde Kelly	R	PA-30	March 4, 1913	Only term while serving in the House until 65th Congress
362	Ambrose Kennedy	R	RI-3	March 4, 1913	
363	William Kennedy	D	CT-5	March 4, 1913	Only term while serving in the House.
364	William Kettner	D	CA-6	March 4, 1913	
365	John A. Key	D	OH-13	March 4, 1913	Chairman: Pensions (1914)
366	Edgar R. Kiess	R	PA-15	March 4, 1913	
367	George J. Kindel	D	CO-1	March 4, 1913	Only term while serving in the House.
368	Sanford Kirkpatrick	D	IA-6	March 4, 1913	Only term while serving in the House.
369	Aaron S. Kreider	R	PA-18	March 4, 1913	
370	Ladislas Lazaro	D	LA-7	March 4, 1913	
371	Claude L'Engle	D	FL-al	March 4, 1913	Only term while serving in the House.
372	John V. Lesher	D	PA-16	March 4, 1913	
373	Fred E. Lewis	R	PA-al	March 4, 1913	Only term while serving in the House.
374	Charles Lieb	D	IN-1	March 4, 1913	
375	Francis O. Lindquist	R	MI-11	March 4, 1913	Only term while serving in the House.
376	J. Washington Logue	D	PA-6	March 4, 1913	Only term while serving in the House.
377	Augustine Lonergan	D	CT-1	March 4, 1913	Only term while serving in the House until 65th Congress
378	Bryan F. Mahan	D	CT-2	March 4, 1913	Only term while serving in the House.
379	James Manahan	R	MN-al	March 4, 1913	Only term while serving in the House.
380	Carl E. Mapes	R	MI-5	March 4, 1913	
381	Lewis J. Martin	D	NJ-6	March 4, 1913	Died on May 5, 1913, while still serving in the House.
382	George McClellan	D	NY-27	March 4, 1913	Only term while serving in the House.
383	Herman A. Metz	D	NY-10	March 4, 1913	Only term while serving in the House.
384	Andrew J. Montague	D	VA-3	March 4, 1913	
385	John M. Morin	R	PA-al	March 4, 1913	
386	Hunter H. Moss, Jr.	R	WV-4	March 4, 1913	
387	William H. Murray	D	OK-al	March 4, 1913	
388	John I. Nolan	R	CA-5	March 4, 1913	
389	Patrick D. Norton	R	ND-3	March 4, 1913	
390	James H. O'Brien	D	NY-9	March 4, 1913	Only term while serving in the House.
391	Woodson R. Oglesby	D	NY-24	March 4, 1913	
392	Frank T. O'Hair	D	IL-18	March 4, 1913	Only term while serving in the House.
393	Denis O'Leary	D	NY-2	March 4, 1913	Resigned on December 31, 1914, while still serving in the House.
394	James S. Parker	R	NY-29	March 4, 1913	
395	John B. Peterson	D	IN-10	March 4, 1913	Only term while serving in the House.
396	Michael F. Phelan	D	MA-7	March 4, 1913	
397	Edmund Platt	R	NY-26	March 4, 1913	
398	Percy E. Quin	D	MS-7	March 4, 1913	
399	J. Willard Ragsdale	D	SC-6	March 4, 1913	
400	Sam Rayburn	D	TX-4	March 4, 1913	
401	Eugene E. Reed	D	NH-1	March 4, 1913	Only term while serving in the House.
402	Michael K. Reilly	D	WI-6	March 4, 1913	
403	John J. Rogers	R	MA-5	March 4, 1913	
404	Arthur R. Rupley	R	PA-al	March 4, 1913	Only term while serving in the House.
405	Harry H. Seldomridge	D	CO-2	March 4, 1913	Only term while serving in the House.
406	Milton W. Shreve	R	PA-25	March 4, 1913	Only term while serving in the House until 66th Congress
407	Nicholas J. Sinnott	R	OR-2	March 4, 1913	
408	Addison T. Smith	R	ID-al	March 4, 1913	
409	Frank O. Smith	D	MD-5	March 4, 1913	Only term while serving in the House.
410	George R. Smith	R	MN-5	March 4, 1913	
411	Raymond B. Stevens	D	NH-2	March 4, 1913	Only term while serving in the House.
412	Tom Stout	D	MT-al	March 4, 1913	
413	Lawrence B. Stringer	D	IL-al	March 4, 1913	Only term while serving in the House.
414	Hatton W. Sumners	D	TX-al	March 4, 1913	
415	Howard Sutherland	R	WV-al	March 4, 1913	
416	Clyde H Tavenner	D	Il-14	March 4, 1913	
417	Benjamin I. Taylor	D	NY-25	March 4, 1913	Only term while serving in the House.
418	Henry W. Temple	Prog	PA-24	March 4, 1913	Only term while serving in the House until 64th Congress
419	Peter G. Ten Eyck	D	NY-28	March 4, 1913	Only term while serving in the House until 67th Congress
420	Thomas C. Thacher	D	MA-16	March 4, 1913	Only term while serving in the House.
421	Joseph B. Thompson	D	OK-al	March 4, 1913	
422	Charles M. Thomson	Prog	IL-10	March 4, 1913	Only term while serving in the House.
423	Allen T. Treadway	R	MA-1	March 4, 1913	
424	Horace W. Vaughan	D	TX-1	March 4, 1913	Only term while serving in the House.
425	John R. Walker	D	GA-11	March 4, 1913	
426	Samuel Wallin	R	NY-30	March 4, 1913	Only term while serving in the House.
427	Allan B. Walsh	D	NJ-4	March 4, 1913	Only term while serving in the House.
428	Anderson H. Walters	R	PA-al	March 4, 1913	Only term while serving in the House until 66th Congress
429	Walter A. Watson	D	VA-4	March 4, 1913	
430	Claude Weaver	D	OK-al	March 4, 1913	Only term while serving in the House.
431	Emmett Wilson	D	FL-3	March 4, 1913	
432	Otis T. Wingo	D	AR-4	March 4, 1913	
433	Samuel E. Winslow	R	MA-4	March 4, 1913	
434	Roy O. Woodruff	Prog	MI-10	March 4, 1913	Only term while serving in the House until 67th Congress
435	George M. Young	R	ND-2	March 4, 1913	
Members joining the House, after the start of the Congress
	John J. Mitchell	D	MA-13	April 15, 1913	Special election. Previously served 1910–11. Last term while serving in the House.
	James P. Buchanan	D	TX-10	April 15, 1913	Special election
	Richard S. Whaley	D	SC-1	April 29, 1913	Special election
	Archibald C. Hart	D	NJ-6	July 22, 1913	Special election. Previously served 1912–13 while in the House.
	William J. MacDonald	Prog	MI-12	August 26, 1913	Seated, after election challenge. Only term while serving in the House.
	John A. Peters	R	ME-3	September 9, 1913	Special election
	Matthew M. Neely	D	WV-1	October 14, 1913	Special election
	Jacob A. Cantor	D	NY-20	November 4, 1913	Special election. Only term while serving in the House.
	Charles P. Coady	D	MD-3	November 4, 1913	Special election
	George W. Loft	D	NY-13	November 4, 1913	Special election
	Calvin D. Paige	R	MA-3	November 4, 1913	Special election
	Frank Park	D	GA-2	November 4, 1913	Special election
	Henry Vollmer	D	IA-2	February 10, 1914	Special election. Only term while serving in the House.
	Dow H. Drukker	R	NJ-7	April 7, 1914	Special election
	James A. Gallivan	D	MA-12	April 7, 1914	Special election
	Christopher C. Harris	D	AL-8	May 11, 1914	Special election. Only term while serving in the House.
	Michael J. Gill	D	MO-12	June 19, 1914	Seated, after election challenge. Only term while serving in the House.
	William O. Mulkey	D	AL-3	June 29, 1914	Special election. Only term while serving in the House.
	Jesse D. Price	D	MD-1	November 3, 1914	Special election
	Carl Vinson	D	GA-10	November 3, 1914	Special election
	Richard W. Parker	D	NJ-9	December 1, 1914	Special election. Previously served 1895–1911 while in the House.
Non voting members
	Jonah K. Kalaniana'ole	R	HI-al	March 4, 1903	Territorial Delegate
	James Wickersham	R	AK-al	March 4, 1909	Territorial Delegate
	Manuel L. Quezón	N	PI-al	November 23, 1909	Resident Commissioner. Nationalist Party (PI).
	Luis Muñoz Rivera	U	PR-al	March 4, 1911	Resident Commissioner. Unionist Party (PR).
	Manuel Earnshaw	Ind	PI-al	March 4, 1913	Resident Commissioner

== See also ==
- 63rd United States Congress
- List of United States congressional districts
- List of United States senators in the 63rd Congress
