= Sewall S. Farwell =

American politician

Sewall Farwell
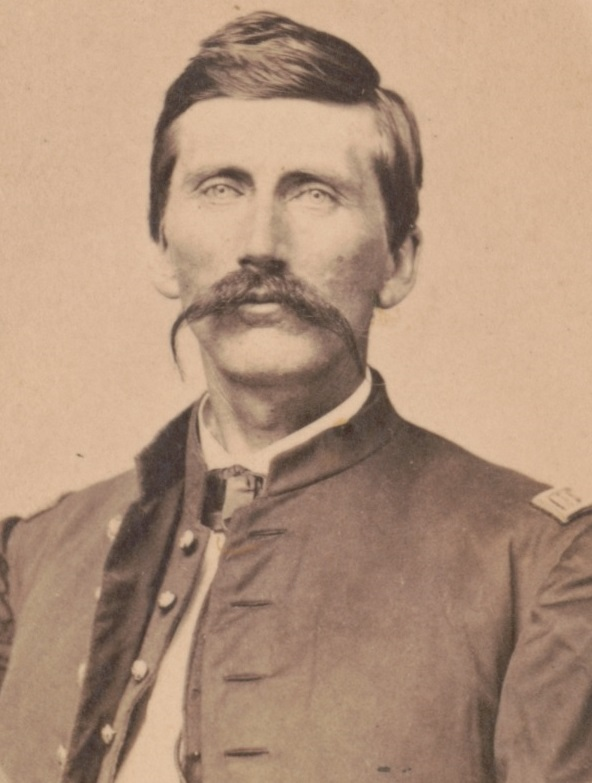

Member of the U.S. House of Representatives from Iowa's 2nd district
- In office March 4, 1881 – March 3, 1883
- Preceded by: Hiram Price
- Succeeded by: Jeremiah H. Murphy

Personal details
- Born: April 26, 1834 Keene, Ohio, U.S.
- Died: September 21, 1909 (aged 75) Monticello, Iowa, U.S
- Party: Republican

Military service
- Branch/service: Union Army
- Years of service: 1862–1864
- Rank: Major
- Unit: Company H, 31st Iowa Infantry Regiment
- Battles/wars: American Civil War; Battle of Chickasaw Bayou; Battle of Arkansas Post; Siege of Vicksburg; Battle of Lookout Mountain; Battle of Missionary Ridge; Battle of Kennesaw Mountain; Battle of Atlanta; Battle of Jonesborough; Sherman's March to the Sea

Sewall Spaulding Farwell (April 26, 1834 – September 21, 1909) was a Civil War officer and one-term Republican U.S. Representative from Iowa's 2nd congressional district.

Born in Keene, Ohio, Farwell attended the common schools and an academy in Cleveland, Ohio. He moved to Iowa in 1852, settling in Jones County, Iowa, and engaged in agricultural pursuits.

In 1862, after the outbreak of the Civil War, he enlisted in the Union Army as captain of Company H, 31st Iowa Volunteer Infantry Regiment. He was promoted to major in 1864, and served until the close of the war. He participated in the battles of Chickasaw Bayou, Arkansas Post, siege of Vicksburg, Lookout Mountain, Missionary Ridge, Kennesaw Mountain, Atlanta, and Jonesboro, and Sherman's March to the Sea.

Farwell served as member of the Iowa Senate from 1865 to 1869. He served (from 1869 to 1873) as an assessor of internal revenue, then (from 1875 to 1881) as collector of internal revenue.

In September 1880, Farwell won the Republican nomination on the 124th ballot to succeed Hiram Price as the Iowa 2nd congressional district's representative in the U.S. House. After winning the general election, he served in the Forty-seventh Congress. He won renomination in 1882, but was defeated in the general election by Democrat Jeremiah Henry Murphy. He served in Congress from March 4, 1881 to March 3, 1883.

Returning to Iowa, he served as president of the Monticello State Bank. He died in Monticello on September 21, 1909, and was interred in Oakwood Cemetery. A dispute among the beneficiaries of his will was resolved by the Iowa Supreme Court in Farwell v. Carpenter, 142 N.W. 227 (Iowa 1913).

== Sources ==
- United States Congress. "Sewall S. Farwell (id: F000039)". Biographical Directory of the United States Congress.

U.S. House of Representatives
Preceded by Hiram Price	Member of the U.S. House of Representatives from Iowa's 2nd congressional district March 4, 1881 – March 3, 1883	Succeeded by Jeremiah H. Murphy
