= Albert F. Dawson =

American politician

Albert Dawson
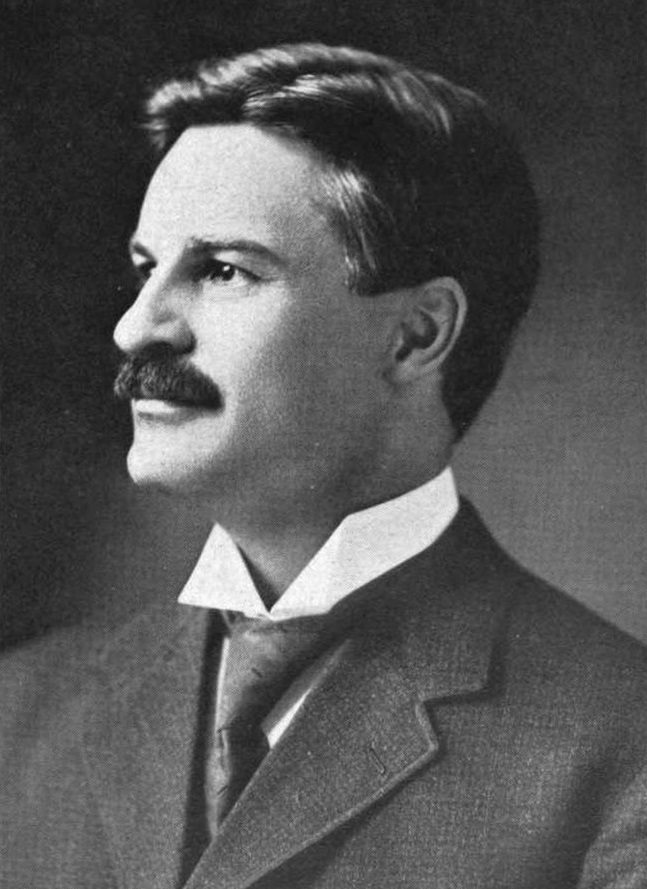

Member of the U.S. House of Representatives from Iowa's 2nd district
- In office March 4, 1905 – March 3, 1911
- Preceded by: Martin J. Wade
- Succeeded by: Irvin S. Pepper

Personal details
- Born: January 26, 1872 Spragueville, Iowa, U.S.
- Died: March 9, 1949 (aged 77) Ohio, U.S
- Party: Republican

Albert Foster Dawson (January 26, 1872 – March 9, 1949) was a three-term Republican U.S. Representative from Iowa's 2nd congressional district.

Born in Spragueville, Iowa, Dawson attended the public schools and the University of Wisconsin–Madison. He engaged in newspaper work at Preston, Iowa, in 1891 and 1892, and was the city editor for the Clinton Herald from 1892 to 1894. He was secretary to Representative George M. Curtis and Senator William B. Allison of Iowa from 1895 to 1905. He studied finance at George Washington University.

In 1904, Dawson challenged incumbent Democratic Congressman Martin J. Wade for the U.S. House seat for Iowa's 2nd congressional district. Riding the coattails of President Theodore Roosevelt's re-election, Dawson, like every other Republican congressional candidate in Iowa, defeated his Democratic opponent. After serving in the Fifty-ninth Congress, Dawson was re-elected in 1906 (to serve in the Sixtieth Congress), and in 1908 (to serve in the Sixty-first Congress). In 1910 he declined to run for a fourth term, citing business and family reasons. In all, he served in Congress from March 4, 1905, to March 3, 1911.

In 1911, he also declined an offer to serve as private secretary to President William Howard Taft. Returning to Iowa at age thirty-eight, he served as president of the First National Bank of Davenport, Iowa, from 1911 to 1929. He was executive secretary of the Republican National Senatorial Committee in 1930, and he was a public utility executive from 1931 to 1945.

He retired from business activities and resided in Highland Park, Illinois, until his death on March 9, 1949, on a train as it neared Cincinnati, Ohio. He was interred in Preston Cemetery.

U.S. House of Representatives
Preceded by Martin J. Wade	Member of the U.S. House of Representatives from Iowa's 2nd congressional district March 4, 1905 – March 3, 1911	Succeeded by Irvin S. Pepper
