= Rumple =

Rumple may refer to:

- John N. W. Rumple
- Rumple (musical)
- "Rumple!" A series of cartoons made by JibJab
