= Senator Cotton (disambiguation) =

Tom Cotton (born 1977) is a U.S. Senator from Arkansas since 2015. Senator Cotton may also refer to:

- Bob Cotton (1915–2006), Australian senator from New South Wales
- Joseph R. Cotton (1890–1983), Massachusetts State Senator
- Norris Cotton (1900–1989), U.S. senator from New Hampshire
- Wickliffe Cotton (1843–1912), Iowa State Senate
