= William P. Wolf =

American politician

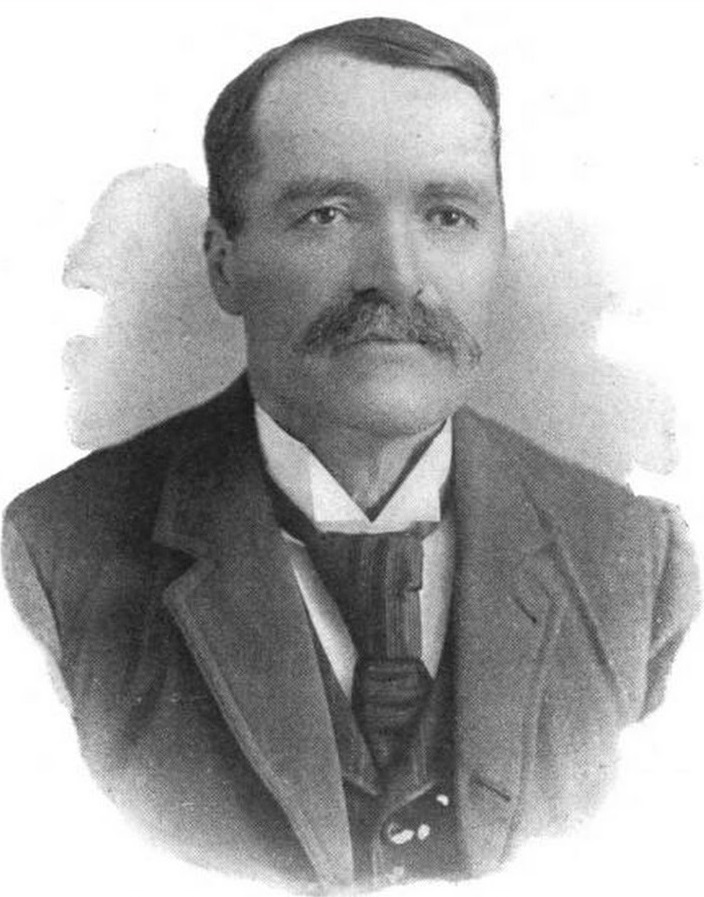

Member of the U.S. House of Representatives from Iowa's 2nd district
- In office December 6, 1870 – March 3, 1871
- Preceded by: William Smyth
- Succeeded by: Aylett R. Cotton

Personal details
- Born: December 1, 1833 Harrisburg, Ohio, U.S.
- Died: September 19, 1896 (aged 62) Tipton, Iowa, U.S
- Party: Republican

Military service
- Branch/service: Union Army
- Rank: Captain
- Unit: 46th Iowa Infantry Regiment, Company I
- Battles/wars: American Civil War

William Penn Wolf (December 1, 1833 – September 19, 1896) was a nineteenth-century politician, lawyer and judge from Iowa.

== Biography ==
Born in Harrisburg, Ohio, Wolf attended public schools as a child and later Holbrook Seminary. He moved to Cedar County, Iowa in 1856, studied law and was admitted to the bar in 1859, commencing practice in Tipton, Iowa. He served as superintendent of public schools and was a member of the Iowa House of Representatives in 1863 and 1864.

During the Civil War, Wolf served as captain of Company I of the 46th Iowa Volunteer Infantry Regiment. He was appointed assistant assessor of internal revenue in 1865, and was a member of the Iowa Senate from 1867 to 1869.

On September 30, 1870, William Smyth, the incumbent Congressman representing Iowa's 2nd congressional district, died while seeking re-election. His death left a vacancy on the Republican ticket and created a need for an immediate successor to finish out his term. Wolf was elected as a Republican to serve out Smyth's term, while fellow Republican Aylett R. Cotton was elected to succeed him. Wolf served from December 6, 1870, to March 3, 1871, when Cotton's two-year term began.

Afterward, Wolf resumed practicing law in Tipton. He was again a member of the Iowa House of Representatives from 1881 to 1885, serving as Speaker of the House in 1884. He was elected a judge of the eighteenth judicial district in the fall of 1894 and served until his death in Tipton on September 19, 1896. He was interred in Masonic Cemetery in Tipton.

U.S. House of Representatives
Preceded by William Smyth	Member of the U.S. House of Representatives from Iowa's 2nd congressional district December 6, 1870 – March 3, 1871	Succeeded by Aylett R. Cotton
