= Harry E. Hull =

American politician (1864–1938)

Harry Hull
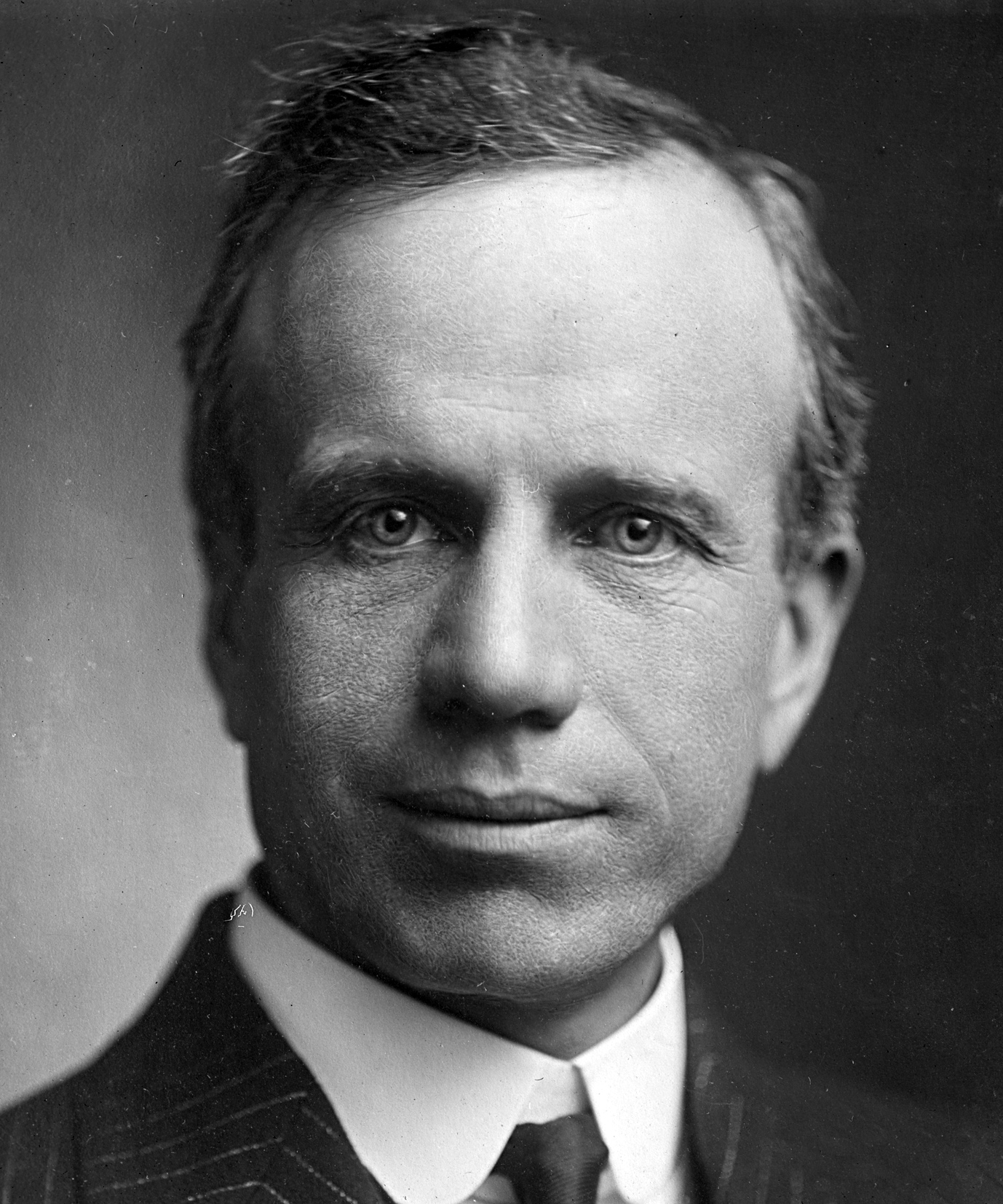

United States Commissioner General of Immigration
- In office May 16, 1925 – April 26, 1933
- President: Calvin Coolidge; Herbert Hoover; Franklin Roosevelt
- Preceded by: William Husband
- Succeeded by: Daniel MacCormack

Member of the U.S. House of Representatives from Iowa's 2nd district
- In office March 4, 1915 – March 3, 1925
- Preceded by: Henry Vollmer
- Succeeded by: F. Dickinson Letts

Personal details
- Born: Harry Edward Hull; March 13, 1864 Belvidere, New York, U.S.
- Died: January 16, 1938 (aged 73) Washington, D.C., U.S.
- Party: Republican
- Spouse: Mary Harris
- Children: Harris

Harry Edward Hull (March 12, 1864 – January 16, 1938) was an American businessman and politician who served five terms as a Republican U.S. Representative from Iowa's 2nd congressional district from 1915 to 1925. He also served as Commissioner General of Immigration in the Coolidge and Hoover administrations.

== Biography ==
Born near Belvidere, New York, Hull moved with his parents to Cedar Rapids, Iowa, in 1873. He attended the grammar and high schools. He was employed as a clerk and bookkeeper for a grain company. He moved to Palo, Iowa, in 1883, and to Williamsburg, Iowa, in 1884 and engaged in the grain business.He also engaged in the manufacture of brick and tile.

He was president of the Williamsburg Telephone Co. He served as one of Williamsburg's aldermen from 1887 to 1889, as its mayor from 1889 to 1901, and as its postmaster from 1901 to 1914. He also served as president of the Williamsburg Fair Association from 1900 to 1915.

He also had a son, Harris B. Hull, who was a high-ranking American military officer.

=== Congress ===
In 1914, Hull was elected as a Republican to represent Iowa's 2nd congressional district in the U.S. House, defeating Democrat W.J. McDonald. He served in the Sixty-fourth Congress and in the four succeeding Congresses. He was one of only fifty representatives who voted against the resolution authorizing the United States' entry into World War I, and one of the few of those fifty to stave off challengers in the wartime primary and general elections in 1918.

In May 1917, during Hull's second term, his wife, Mary Louise Harris Hull, died when she mistook poison tablets for a headache remedy.

In 1924, Hull opposed Henry Ford's proposal to operate fertilizer plants and a hydroelectric dam on the Tennessee River near Muscle Shoals, Alabama. Hull argued against the project over concerns about private business interests controlling important public resources. Ford later cancelled his plans for the project.

When seeking renomination in 1924, he was defeated in the Republican primary by Judge F. Dickinson Letts. In all, he served from March 4, 1915, to March 3, 1925.

=== Federal agency position ===
On May 15, 1925, he was appointed by President Calvin Coolidge as commissioner general of immigration and served in that position until 1933, when he retired.

=== Retirement and death ===
He continued to reside in Washington, D.C., until his death there on January 16, 1938. He was interred in Oak Hill Cemetery in Williamsburg.

U.S. House of Representatives
Preceded by Henry Vollmer	Member of the U.S. House of Representatives from Iowa's 2nd congressional district 1915–1925	Succeeded by F. Dickinson Letts
Political offices
Preceded by William Husband	Commissioner General of Immigration; 1925–1933	Succeeded by Daniel MacCormack
