= Hiram Price =

American politician

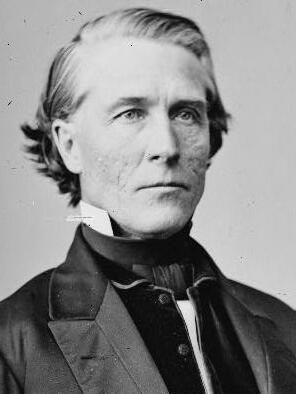

22nd Commissioner of Indian Affairs
- In office 1881–1885
- President: James Garfield; Chester A. Arthur
- Preceded by: Rowland E. Trowbridge
- Succeeded by: John DeWitt Clinton Atkins

Member of the U.S. House of Representatives from Iowa's 2nd district
- In office March 4, 1877 – March 3, 1881
- Preceded by: John Q. Tufts
- Succeeded by: Sewall S. Farwell
- In office March 4, 1863 – March 3, 1869
- Preceded by: William Vandever
- Succeeded by: William Smyth

Personal details
- Born: January 10, 1814 Washington County, Pennsylvania, U.S.
- Died: May 30, 1901 (aged 87) Washington, D.C., U.S.
- Party: Republican
- Profession: Politician, Banker, Merchant, Bookkeeper, Bank President, Railroad President

Hiram Price (January 10, 1814 – May 30, 1901) was a nineteenth-century banker, merchant, bookkeeper, bank president, railroad president, and five-term Republican congressman from Iowa's 2nd congressional district and as commissioner of Indian Affairs.

== Life and career ==
Born in Washington County, Pennsylvania, Price attended common schools as a child and engaged in agricultural pursuits on his father's farm for several years. He worked as a bookkeeper for a large commission house near Pittsburgh, Pennsylvania and equipped himself for mercantile life. He moved to Davenport, Iowa in 1844 where he engaged in the mercantile business, served as collector, treasurer, and recorder of Scott County, Iowa and was president of the State Bank of Iowa from 1859 to 1866. He was one of fifteen men to sign the Articles of Incorporation for the Oakdale Cemetery Company on May 14, 1856.

At the outbreak of the Civil War, Governor Samuel J. Kirkwood appointed Price paymaster general of Iowa troops to whom he advanced large sums of money.

In 1862, he was elected as a Republican to represent Iowa's 2nd congressional district in the United States House of Representatives. He served three consecutive terms, from 1863 to 1869. During that period, he served as chairman of the Committee on Revolutionary Claims from 1863 to 1865 and of the Committee on Pacific Railroads from 1865 to 1869.

After Price declined renomination in 1868, returned to Iowa, where he served as president of the First National Bank of Davenport in 1873 and president of the Davenport and St. Paul Railroad. He was also a trustee of the Iowa Soldiers' Orphans' Home, being instrumental in gaining the donation of Camp Kinsman in Davenport for the Home.

In 1876, voters in the Second District returned Price to the House of Representatives, where he served two additional terms (from 1877 to 1881). He declined renomination in 1880. He was appointed chief clerk of the Bureau of Indian Affairs in 1881 and later the same year was appointed commissioner of Indian Affairs by President James A. Garfield, serving from 1881 to 1885.

Price lived in Washington, D.C. until his death there on May 30, 1901. He was interred in Oakdale Cemetery in Davenport, Iowa.

U.S. House of Representatives
Preceded by William Vandever	Member of the U.S. House of Representatives from Iowa's 2nd congressional district March 4, 1863 – March 3, 1869	Succeeded by William Smyth
Preceded by John Q. Tufts	Member of the U.S. House of Representatives from Iowa's 2nd congressional district March 4, 1877 – March 3, 1881	Succeeded by Sewall S. Farwell
