= Martin J. Wade =

American judge

Martin Joseph Wade
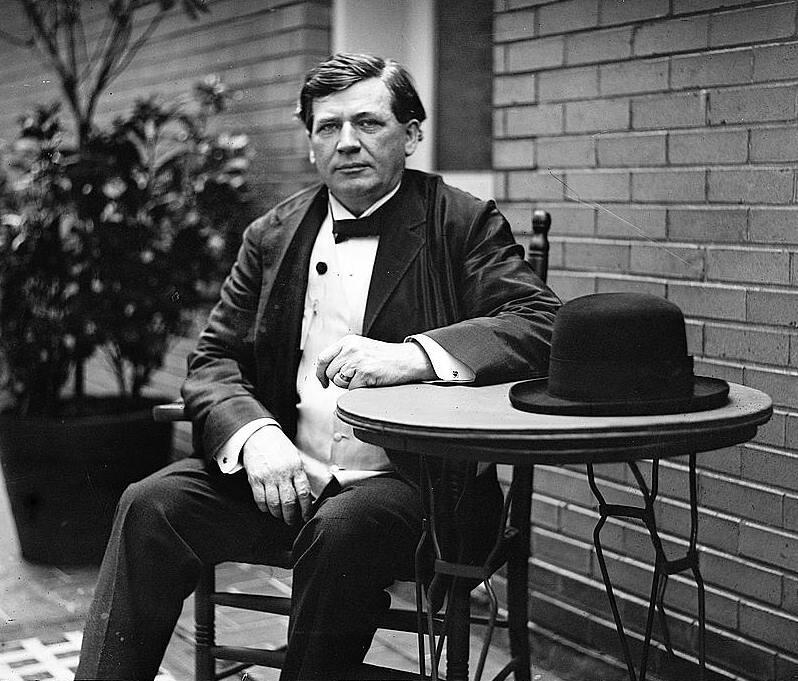
- Martin Wade, Bain News Service, undated

Judge of the United States District Court for the Southern District of Iowa
- In office March 3, 1915 – April 16, 1931
- Appointed by: Woodrow Wilson
- Preceded by: Smith McPherson
- Succeeded by: Seat abolished

Member of the U.S. House of Representatives from Iowa's 2nd district
- In office March 4, 1903 – March 3, 1905
- Preceded by: John N. W. Rumple
- Succeeded by: Albert F. Dawson

Personal details
- Born: Martin Joseph Wade; October 20, 1861 Burlington, Vermont, U.S.
- Died: April 16, 1931 (aged 69) Los Angeles, California, U.S.
- Resting place: St. Joseph's Cemetery; Iowa City, Iowa
- Party: Democratic
- Relatives: Hugh Wade (nephew)

Martin Joseph Wade (October 20, 1861 – April 16, 1931) was a United States representative from Iowa and a United States district judge of the United States District Court for the Southern District of Iowa.

== Education and career ==
Born on October 20, 1861, in Burlington, Chittenden County, Vermont, Wade moved to Iowa with his parents at an early age, eventually settling on a farm in Butler County, "which was then largely a broad, unbroken prairie, and the usual hardships of pioneer life were experienced". He attended the common schools and St. Joseph's College (later Columbia University) in Dubuque, Iowa. He received a Bachelor of Laws in 1886 from the University of Iowa College of Law. He was admitted to the bar and entered private practice in Iowa City, Iowa from 1886 to 1893. He was a faculty member at the University of Iowa from 1890 to 1903, as a lecturer in law from 1890 to 1894 and as a Professor of Medical Jurisprudence from 1894 to 1903. He was a Judge of the Iowa District Court for the Eighth Judicial District from 1893 to 1902. He was President of the Iowa State Bar Association in 1897 and 1898.

== Congressional service ==
Wade was elected as a Democrat from Iowa's 2nd congressional district to the United States House of Representatives of the 58th United States Congress, serving from March 4, 1903 to March 3, 1905. The incumbent congressman, John N. W. Rumple, did not seek re-election for health reasons, and Wade defeated Republican attorney W. H. Hoffman. As Wade would write in autobiographical information submitted to Congress following his election, he had refused to make any campaign speeches during the race because he considered it an improper thing for a judge to do. He was an unsuccessful candidate for reelection in 1904 to the 59th United States Congress. He was swept out of office as part of a Republican landslide, losing to Republican Albert F. Dawson in the general election. Wade returned to private practice in Iowa City from 1905 to 1915. He was a delegate to the Democratic National Conventions in 1904 and 1912. Wade's congressional staffer, Irvin S. Pepper, was elected to Wade's former seat in 1910, following Dawson's retirement.

== Federal judicial service ==
Wade was nominated by President Woodrow Wilson on February 26, 1915, to a seat on the United States District Court for the Southern District of Iowa vacated by Judge Smith McPherson. He was confirmed by the United States Senate on March 3, 1915, and received his commission the same day. His service terminated on April 16, 1931, due to his death in Los Angeles, California, while on a visit in that state. He was interred in St. Joseph's Cemetery in Iowa City.

=== Notable case ===
Wade presided over the trial of Kate Richards O'Hare in 1917 and sentenced her to 5 years in prison. Her sentence was commuted in 1920 after a national campaign, and she later received a full pardon by Calvin Coolidge. Wade presided over the Davenport sedition trials in 1917 and 1918, and sentenced Daniel Wallace to 20 years in prison for making a speech opposing the draft and critical of the United States' allies.

== Sources ==
- "Martin J. Wade". Biographical Directory of the United States Congress.

U.S. House of Representatives
Preceded by John N. W. Rumple	Member of the U.S. House of Representatives from Iowa's 2nd congressional district 1903–1905	Succeeded by Albert F. Dawson
Legal offices
Preceded by Smith McPherson	Judge of the United States District Court for the Southern District of Iowa; 1915–1931	Succeeded by Seat abolished
