= Jeremiah H. Murphy =

American politician (1835–1893)

Jeremiah Henry Murphy
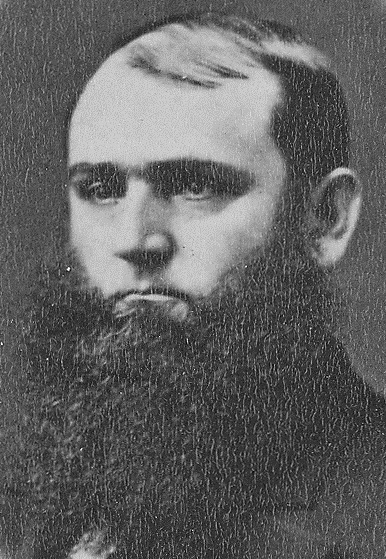
- Iowa Legislature illustration, circa 1876.

Member of the U.S. House of Representatives from Iowa's 2nd district
- In office March 4, 1883 – March 3, 1887
- Preceded by: Sewall S. Farwell
- Succeeded by: Walter I. Hayes

Member of the Iowa Senate
- In office 1890-1891

Personal details
- Born: February 19, 1835 Lowell, Massachusetts, U.S.
- Died: December 11, 1893 (aged 58) Washington, D.C., U.S.
- Resting place: Mount Calvary Cemetery
- Party: Democratic
- Education: University of Iowa

Jeremiah Henry Murphy (February 19, 1835 – December 11, 1893) was a two-term Democratic U.S. Representative from Iowa's 2nd congressional district.

Born in Lowell, Massachusetts, Murphy moved with his parents to Fond du Lac County, Wisconsin, in 1849, and to Iowa County, Iowa, in 1852. He attended the Boston public schools and Appleton (Wisconsin) University. He graduated from the University of Iowa at Iowa City in 1857. After studying law, he was admitted to the bar in 1858 and commenced practice in Marengo, Iowa.

Murphy was elected alderman in 1860. He served as delegate to the Democratic National Convention in 1864 and 1868. In 1867, he moved to Davenport, Iowa and continued the practice of law.

Murphy was elected mayor of Davenport in 1873 and again in 1878. He served one term as a member of the Iowa Senate from 1874 to 1878. He was an unsuccessful candidate for election in 1876 to represent Iowa's 2nd congressional district in the Forty-fifth Congress.

In 1882, Murphy again ran for Congress, challenging a freshman incumbent Republican, Sewall S. Farwell. After Murphy won the general election, he took his seat in the 48th United States Congress.

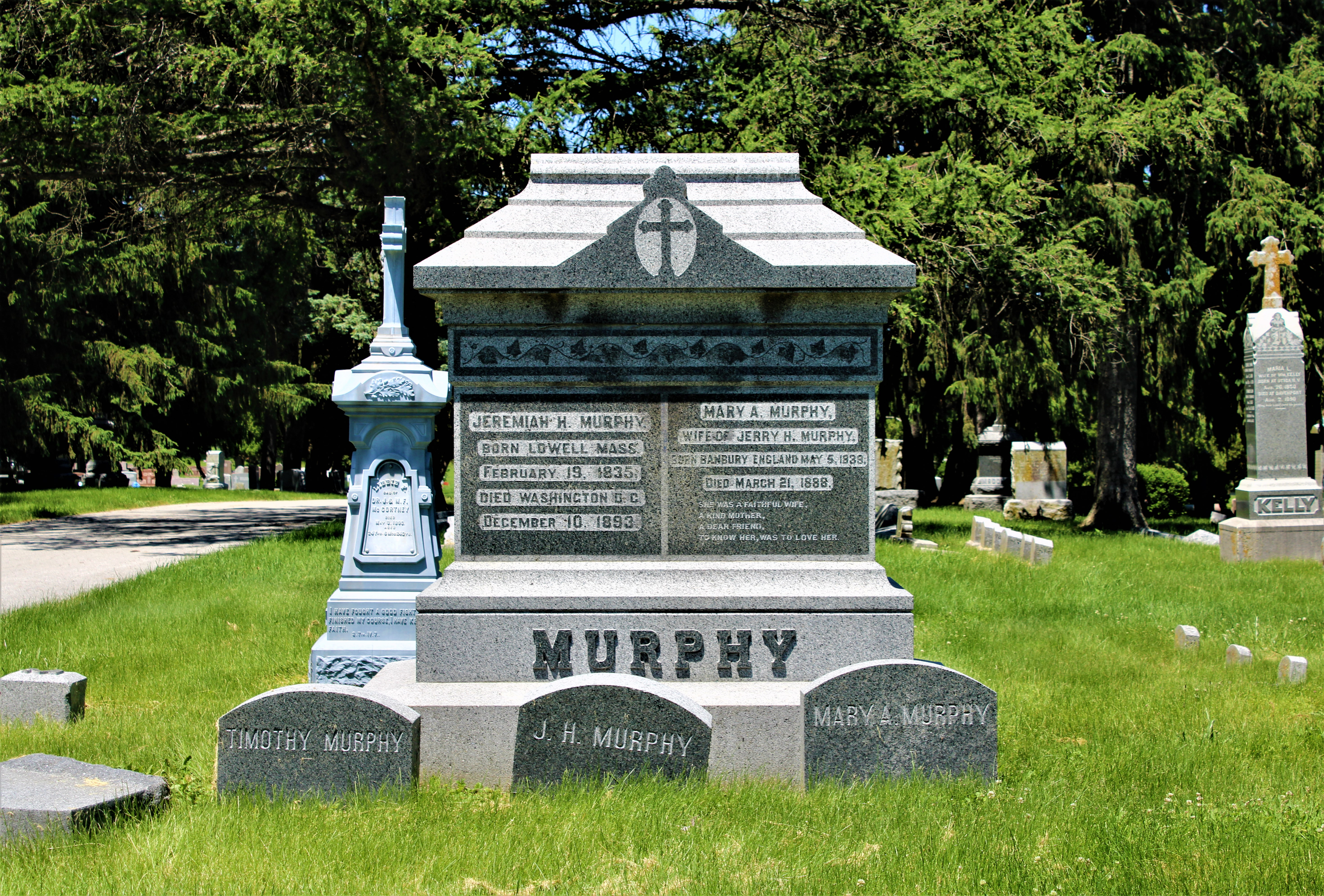
Grave in Mount Calvary Cemetery

Then, after winning re-election two years later (in 1884), he served in the 49th United States Congress. However, when seeking a third term in 1886, Murphy was defeated in the Democratic district convention, by Walter I. Hayes. In all, Murphy served in Congress from March 4, 1883 to March 3, 1887. Between the Civil War and the Great Depression, Murphy and Hayes were the only two Democratic congressmen from Iowa to serve two or more full terms.

He lived in retirement in Washington, D.C., until his death in that city on December 11, 1893. He was interred in St. Marguerite's Cemetery (now Mount Calvary Cemetery) in Davenport.

U.S. House of Representatives
Preceded by Sewall S. Farwell	Member of the U.S. House of Representatives from Iowa's 2nd congressional district March 4, 1883 – March 3, 1887	Succeeded by Walter I. Hayes
