= Walter I. Hayes =

American politician

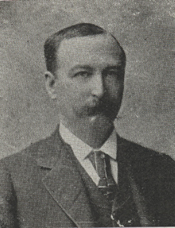

Member of the U.S. House of Representatives from Iowa's 2nd district
- In office March 4, 1887 – March 3, 1895
- Preceded by: Jeremiah H. Murphy
- Succeeded by: George M. Curtis

Personal details
- Born: December 9, 1841 Marshall, Michigan, U.S.
- Died: March 14, 1901 (aged 59) Marshall, Michigan, U.S.
- Party: Democratic
- Education: University of Michigan

Walter Ingalls Hayes (December 9, 1841 – March 14, 1901) was a four-term Democratic U.S. Representative from Iowa's 2nd congressional district during the Gilded Age.

Hayes was born in Marshall, Michigan. He attended the common schools and graduated from the University of Michigan Law School in Ann Arbor in 1863, and was admitted to the bar the same year. Hayes commenced practice in Marshall and in 1864 and 1865 held the positions of Marshall city attorney and United States commissioner for the eastern district of Michigan.

Hayes relocating to Iowa as the Civil War came to an end. He served as United States commissioner for Iowa from 1865 to 1875 and was city solicitor of Clinton, Iowa, in 1870. Hayes was the district judge of the seventh judicial district of Iowa from 1875 to 1887. In that capacity, in 1882 he presided over one of the most important cases in the state of that era, in which liquor merchants challenged the enforceability of the 1882 amendment to the Iowa Constitution requiring prohibition. Hayes declared the amendment unconstitutional on procedural grounds, based on the failure of the law to pass both houses of the Iowa General Assembly in identical form. The Iowa Supreme Court affirmed Hayes' ruling, but in the next session the Iowa General Assembly adopted prohibition, by statute, in a constitutional fashion. Though the bill had been re-submitted, passed and Hayes' ruling had been approved by the Iowa Supreme Court, Hayes was impeached for malfeasance and misdemeanors and removed from office.

Hayes then served as delegate to the 1884 Democratic National Convention.

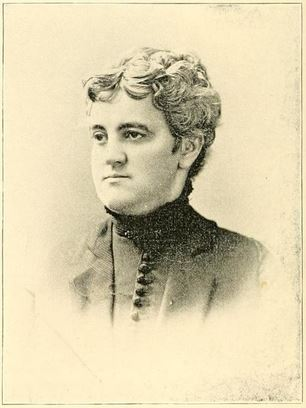
Frances Coan

He married Frances Coan, a native of New York. She was the eldest of a family of five children. Her father, who was an energetic businessman, moved with his family to Clinton, Iowa, where he established the First National Lank. Coan first met Hayes when she was visiting friends in Michigan, and they were married in less than a year. Several of Coan's relatives are missionaries, and she was a member of the Presbyterian Church.

In 1886, Hayes wrested the Democratic nomination for the 2nd district away from incumbent Jeremiah Henry Murphy. To enhance the chances for Iowa Republicans to hold all other Congressional seats in Iowa, the state's General Assembly had included many of the most Democratic-leaning areas of eastern Iowa in a single district (the second). Hayes won the general election that year and represented the 2nd district in the 50th United States Congress. He was also elected to the three succeeding Congresses. However, in 1894, when seeking a fifth term, Hayes was defeated in the general election by Republican George M. Curtis. Between the Civil War and the Great Depression, Hayes was the only Democratic congressman from Iowa to serve more than two terms, and (along with Murphy) was one of only two who served two full terms.

While in Congress, Hayes served as chairman of the Committee on Education in the Fifty-second Congress. In all, he served in Congress from March 4, 1887, to March 3, 1895.

After leaving Congress, Hayes resumed the practice of law in Clinton. He served as a member of the Iowa House of Representatives in 1897 and 1898, replacing Nathaniel Anson Merrell of District 45, who had died in office.

He died in Marshall, Michigan, on March 14, 1901. He was interred in Springdale Cemetery in Clinton.

U.S. House of Representatives
Preceded by Jeremiah H. Murphy	Member of the U.S. House of Representatives from Iowa's 2nd congressional district March 4, 1887 – March 3, 1895	Succeeded by George M. Curtis
