= List of United States senators in the 63rd Congress =

This is a complete list of United States senators during the 63rd United States Congress listed by seniority from March 4, 1913, to March 3, 1915.

Order of service is based on the commencement of the senator's first term. Behind this is former service as a senator (only giving the senator seniority within their new incoming class), service as vice president, a House member, a cabinet secretary, or a governor of a state. The final factor is the population of the senator's state.

Senators who were sworn in during the middle of the Congress (up until the last senator who was not sworn in early after winning the November 1914 election) are listed at the end of the list with no number.

== Terms of service ==
Class	Terms of service of senators that expired in years
Class 3	Terms of service of senators that expired in 1915 (AL, AR, AZ, CA, CO, CT, FL, GA, ID, IL, IN, IA, KS, KY, LA, MD, MO, NC, ND, NH, NV, NY, OH, OK, OR, PA, SC, SD, UT, VT, WA, and WI.)
Class 1	Terms of service of senators that expired in 1917 (AZ, CA, CT, DE, FL, IN, MA, MD, ME, MI, MN, MO, MS, MT, ND, NE, NJ, NM, NV, NY, OH, PA, RI, TN, TX, UT, VA, VT, WA, WI, WV, and WY.)
Class 2	Terms of service of senators that expired in 1919 (AL, AR, CO, DE, GA, IA, ID, IL, KS, KY, LA, MA, ME, MI, MN, MS, MT, NC, NE, NH, NJ, NM, OK, OR, RI, SC, SD, TN, TX, VA, WV, and WY.)

== U.S. Senate seniority list ==
U.S. Senate seniority
Rank	Senator (party-state)	Seniority date	Other factors
1	Jacob H. Gallinger (R-NH)	March 4, 1891	
2	Henry Cabot Lodge (R-MA)	March 4, 1893	
3	George C. Perkins (R-CA)	July 26, 1893	
4	Clarence D. Clark (R-WY)	January 24, 1895	
5	Francis E. Warren (R-WY)	March 4, 1895	Previously a senator
6	Knute Nelson (R-MN)	March 4, 1895	Former governor, Minnesota 20th in population (1890)
7	Benjamin Tillman (D-SC)	March 4, 1895	Former governor, South Carolina 23rd in population (1890)
8	Augustus O. Bacon (D-GA)	March 4, 1895	Georgia 12th in population (1890)
9	Thomas S. Martin (D-VA)	March 4, 1895	Virginia 15th in population (1890)
10	Boies Penrose (R-PA)	March 4, 1897	
11	Charles A. Culberson (D-TX)	March 4, 1899	Former governor
12	Porter McCumber (R-ND)	March 4, 1899	
13	William P. Dillingham (R-VT)	October 18, 1900	
14	Moses Clapp (R-MN)	January 23, 1901	
15	Furnifold M. Simmons (D-NC)	March 4, 1901	
16	Francis Newlands (D-NV)	March 4, 1903	Former representative
17	William J. Stone (D-MO)	March 4, 1903	Former governor, Missouri 5th in population (1900)
18	James P. Clarke (D-AR)	March 4, 1903	Former governor, Arkansas 25th in population (1900)
19	Lee S. Overman (D-NC)	March 4, 1903	North Carolina 15th in population (1900)
20	Reed Smoot (R-UT)	March 4, 1903	Utah 41st in population (1900)
21	George Sutherland (R-UT)	March 4, 1905	
22	Frank B. Brandegee (R-CT)	May 10, 1905	
23	Robert M. La Follette, Sr. (R-WI)	January 4, 1906	
24	Henry du Pont (R-DE)	June 13, 1906	
25	William A. Smith (R-MI)	February 9, 1907	
26	William Borah (R-ID)	March 4, 1907	
27	Isaac Stephenson (R-WI)	May 17, 1907	
28	John H. Bankhead (D-AL)	June 18, 1907	
29	Joseph F. Johnston (D-AL)	August 6, 1907	
30	Thomas Gore (D-OK)	December 11, 1907	"G" 7th in alphabet
31	Robert Owen (D-OK)	December 11, 1907	"O" 15th in alphabet
32	John Walter Smith (D-MD)	March 25, 1908	
33	Carroll S. Page (R-VT)	October 21, 1908	
34	Albert B. Cummins (R-IA)	November 24, 1908	
35	Theodore E. Burton (R-OH)	March 4, 1909	Former representative (16 years)
36	Wesley Jones (R-WA)	March 4, 1909	Former representative (10 years)
37	Benjamin Shively (D-IN)	March 4, 1909	Former representative (7 years)
38	Elihu Root (R-NY)	March 4, 1909	Former cabinet member
39	William O. Bradley (R-KY)	March 4, 1909	Former governor, Kentucky 12th in population (1900)
40	Coe Crawford (R-SD)	March 4, 1909	Former governor, South Dakota 38th in population (1900)
41	Joseph Bristow (R-KS)	March 4, 1909	Kansas 22nd in population (1900)
42	Ellison D. Smith (D-SC)	March 4, 1909	South Carolina 24th in population (1900)
43	Duncan U. Fletcher (D-FL)	March 4, 1909	Florida 33rd in population (1900)
44	George Chamberlain (D-OR)	March 4, 1909	Oregon 36th in population (1900)
45	George T. Oliver (R-PA)	March 17, 1909	
46	Claude A. Swanson (D-VA)	August 1, 1910	
47	John Thornton (D-LA)	December 7, 1910	
48	Asle Gronna (R-ND)	February 2, 1911	
49	John S. Williams (D-MS)	March 4, 1911	Former representative (16 years)
50	Charles Townsend (R-MI)	March 4, 1911	Former representative (8 years)
51	Gilbert Hitchcock (D-NE)	March 4, 1911	Former representative (6 years)
52	Miles Poindexter (R-WA)	March 4, 1911	Former representative (2 years)
53	George P. McLean (R-CT)	March 4, 1911	Former governor
54	Atlee Pomerene (D-OH)	March 4, 1911	Ohio 4th in population (1910)
55	James A. Reed (D-MO)	March 4, 1911	Missouri 7th in population (1910)
56	John W. Kern (D-IN)	March 4, 1911	Indiana 9th in population (1910)
57	James E. Martine (D-NJ)	March 4, 1911	New Jersey 11th in population (1910)
58	John D. Works (R-CA)	March 4, 1911	California 12th in population (1910)
59	Luke Lea (D-TN)	March 4, 1911	Tennessee 17th in population (1910)
60	William E. Chilton (D-WV)	March 4, 1911	West Virginia 28th in population (1910)
61	Nathan Bryan (D-FL)	March 4, 1911	Florida 33rd in population (1910)
62	Charles F. Johnson (D-ME)	March 4, 1911	Maine 34th in population (1910)
63	Henry F. Lippitt (R-RI)	March 4, 1911	Rhode Island 38th in population (1910)
64	Henry L. Myers (D-MT)	March 4, 1911	Montana 40th in population (1910)
65	James O'Gorman (D-NY)	April 4, 1911	
66	William S. Kenyon (R-IA)	April 12, 1911	
67	Hoke Smith (D-GA)	November 16, 1911	
68	Thomas B. Catron (R-NM)	March 27, 1912	Former delegate, New Mexico 43rd in population (1910)
69	Marcus A. Smith (D-AZ)	March 27, 1912	Former delegate, Arizona 45th in population (1910)
70	Albert B. Fall (R-NM)	March 27, 1912	New Mexico 43rd in population (1910)
71	Henry F. Ashurst (D-AZ)	March 27, 1912	Arizona 45th in population (1910)
72	William P. Jackson (R-MD)	November 29, 1912	
73	Charles Thomas (D-CO)	January 15, 1913	
74	James Brady (R-ID)	January 24, 1913	
75	Key Pittman (D-NV)	January 29, 1913	
76	Morris Sheppard (D-TX)	February 3, 1913	
77	Edwin Burleigh (R-ME)	March 4, 1913	Former representative (14 years), former governor
78	Joseph E. Ransdell (D-LA)	March 4, 1913	Former representative (14 years)
79	Joseph Robinson (R-AR)	March 4, 1913	Former representative (10 years), former governor
80	Ollie James (R-KY)	March 4, 1913	Former representative (10 years), Kentucky 14th in population (1910)
81	George W. Norris (R-NE)	March 4, 1913	Former representative (10 years), Nebraska 29th in population (1910)
82	John F. Shafroth (D-CO)	March 4, 1913	Former representative (9 years), former governor
83	William Hughes (D-NJ)	March 4, 1913	Former representative (9 years)
84	John W. Weeks (R-MA)	March 4, 1913	Former representative (8 years)
85	Nathan Goff, Jr. (R-WV)	March 4, 1913	Former representative (6 years), former cabinet member
86	James K. Vardaman (D-MS)	March 4, 1913	Former governor
87	John Shields (D-TN)	March 4, 1913	Tennessee 17th in population (1910)
88	William H. Thompson (D-KS)	March 4, 1913	Kansas 22nd in population (1910)
89	Harry Lane (D-OR)	March 4, 1913	Oregon 35th in population (1910)
90	Thomas Sterling (R-SD)	March 4, 1913	South Dakota 36th in population (1910)
91	LeBaron Colt (R-RI)	March 4, 1913	Rhode Island 38th in population (1910)
92	Thomas J. Walsh (D-MT)	March 4, 1913	Montana 40th in population (1910)
93	Willard Saulsbury, Jr. (D-DE)	March 4, 1913	Delaware 46th in population (1910)
94	Henry F. Hollis (D-NH)	March 13, 1913	
95	J. Hamilton Lewis (D-IL)	March 26, 1913	
96	Lawrence Sherman (R-IL)	March 26, 1913	
	Blair Lee (D-MD)	January 29, 1914	
	William West (D-GA)	March 2, 1914	
	Francis White (D-AL)	May 11, 1914	
	Johnson N. Camden Jr. (D-KY)	June 16, 1914	
	Thomas W. Hardwick (D-GA)	November 4, 1914	

== See also ==
- 63rd United States Congress
- List of United States representatives in the 63rd Congress
