= William Smyth (American politician) =

American politician, lawyer and judge (1824–1870)

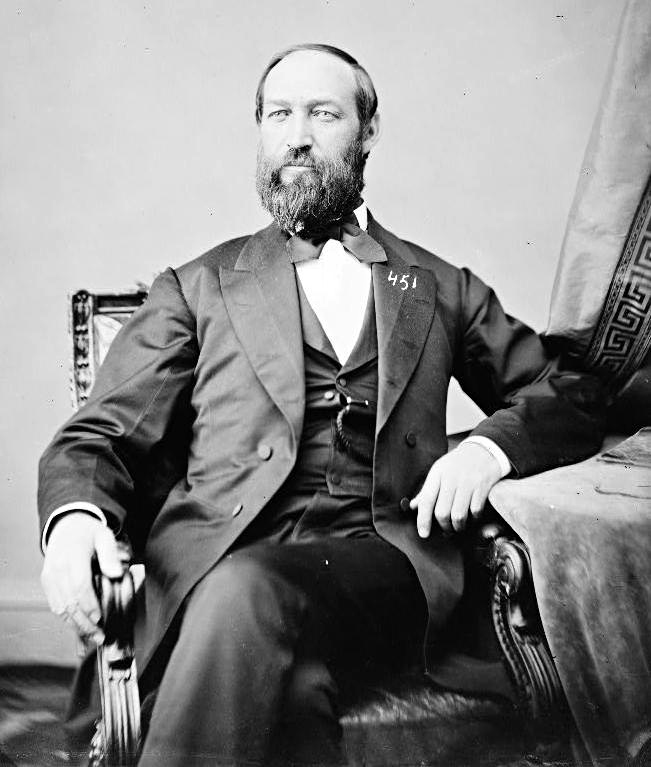

Member of the U.S. House of Representatives from Iowa's 2nd district
- In office March 4, 1869 – September 30, 1870
- Preceded by: Hiram Price
- Succeeded by: William P. Wolf

Personal details
- Born: January 3, 1824 Eden, Ireland
- Died: September 30, 1870 (aged 46) Marion, Iowa, US
- Party: Republican
- Spouse: Mary Brier Smyth
- Profession: Politician, Lawyer, Judge

William Smyth (January 3, 1824 – September 30, 1870) was a native of County Tyrone in Northern Ireland who became a politician, lawyer and judge in the United States during the nineteenth century.

== Formative years ==
Born in Eden, County Tyrone, Ireland on January 3, 1824, Smyth attended rural schools as a child, completed preparatory studies and immigrated to the United States with his parents in 1838. After initially settling with his family in Pennsylvania, he moved to Iowa in 1844. While there, he attended the University of Iowa, where he studied law, and was subsequently admitted to the bar in 1847.

== Career ==
Following the completion of his law studies, Smyth opened a legal practice in Marion, Iowa. Smyth then served as prosecuting attorney for Linn County, Iowa from 1848 to 1853 and was appointed judge of the district court for the fourth judicial district of Iowa in 1853, a post he held until 1857.

He then resumed his private law practice. In 1858, he was appointed as chair of the commission to codify and revise the Iowa State laws.

During the Civil War, he served for two years as colonel of the 31st Iowa Volunteer Infantry Regiment.

In 1868, Smyth was elected as a Republican to represent Iowa's 2nd congressional district in the United States House of Representatives, serving from March 1869 until his death in 1870.

== Death and interment ==
Smyth died in Marion, Iowa on September 30, 1870, while running for reelection. He was interred in the Oak Shade Cemetery in Marion.

== See also ==
- List of members of the United States Congress who died in office (1790–1899)

U.S. House of Representatives
Preceded by Hiram Price	Member of the U.S. House of Representatives from Iowa's 2nd congressional district March 4, 1869 – September 30, 1870	Succeeded by William P. Wolf
