= Aylett R. Cotton =

American politician (1826–1912)

Aylett Rains Cotton
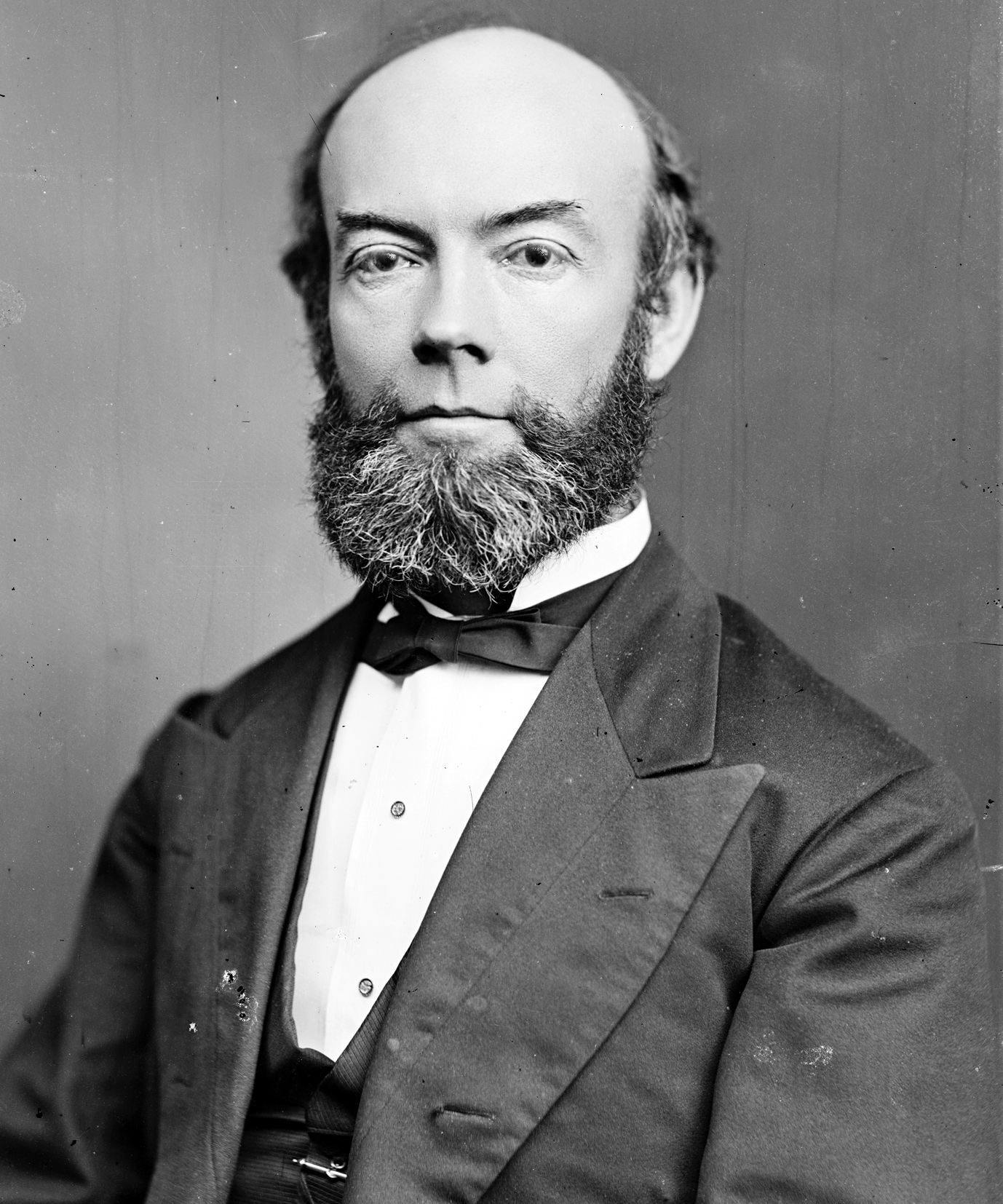

Member of the U.S. House of Representatives from Iowa's 2nd district
- In office March 4, 1871 – March 3, 1875
- Preceded by: William P. Wolf
- Succeeded by: John Q. Tufts

Member of the Iowa House of Representatives
- In office January 13, 1868 – March 3, 1871
- Constituency: District 33 (1868–1870); District 31 (1870–1871)

Personal details
- Born: November 29, 1826 Austintown, Ohio, U.S.
- Died: October 30, 1912 (aged 85) San Francisco, California, U.S.
- Party: Republican
- Spouse: Hattie Elizabeth Walker Cotton
- Relatives: Wickliffe Cotton (brother)

Aylett Rains Cotton (November 29, 1826 – October 30, 1912) was an American politician, lawyer, judge, educator and miner active in Iowa and Northern California.

== Early life and education ==
Born in Austintown, Ohio, Cotton attended local public schools as a child and later Cottage Hill Academy in Ellsworth, Ohio, in 1842 and 1843. He taught school and moved to DeWitt, Iowa, with his father in 1844. He attended Allegheny College in Meadville, Pennsylvania, in 1845 and taught school at Union Academy in Fayette County, Tennessee, from 1845 to 1847.

== Career ==
He returned to Iowa in 1847, where he studied law and was admitted to the bar in 1848. He then began practicing law in Iowa.

Cotton moved to California in 1849 and engaged in mining on the Feather River in the Sacramento Valley. He moved to Lyons, Iowa, in 1851 and became county judge of Clinton County, Iowa, the same year, serving until 1853. He was prosecuting attorney of Clinton County in 1854, mayor of Lyons from 1855 to 1857 and was a member of the Iowa constitutional convention in 1857.

Cotton was a member of the Iowa House of Representatives from 1868 to 1871, serving as Speaker of the House in his final term.

In 1870 he was elected a Republican to represent Iowa's 2nd congressional district in the United States House of Representatives. While serving in the Forty-second Congress, he narrowly defeated Democrat William E. Leffingwell to win a second term, becoming a member of the Forty-third Congress. Although his official Congressional biography states that he declined to run for a third term in 1874, newspaper reports indicate that he was an active but unsuccessful candidate for renomination at the Republican district convention in DeWitt, Iowa, on September 1, 1874, losing to John Q. Tufts on the 30th ballot. In all, he served from March 4, 1871, to March 3, 1875. He returned to California in 1883 and commenced practicing law in San Francisco, California, until his death.

== Personal life ==
Cotton's younger brother Wickliffe also served in the Iowa General Assembly. Aylett Cotton married Hattie Walker. Cotton died on October 30, 1912. He was interred in Woodlawn Memorial Park Cemetery in Colma, California.

U.S. House of Representatives
Preceded by William P. Wolf	Member of the U.S. House of Representatives from Iowa's 2nd congressional district March 4, 1871 – March 3, 1875	Succeeded by John Q. Tufts
