= Joseph R. Lane =

American politician

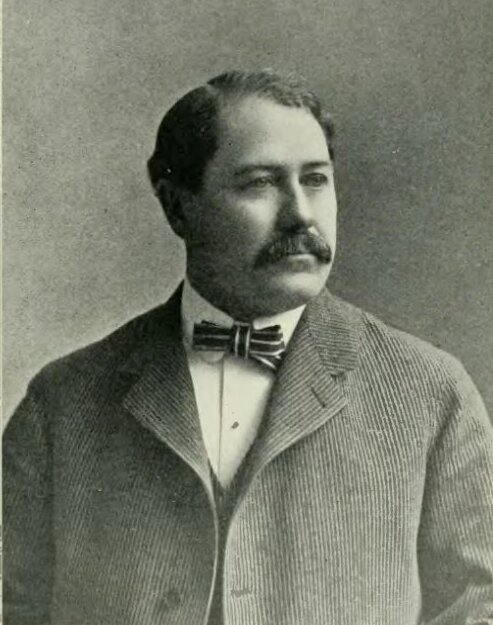

Member of the U.S. House of Representatives from Iowa's 2nd district
- In office March 4, 1899 – March 3, 1901
- Preceded by: George M. Curtis
- Succeeded by: John N. W. Rumple

Personal details
- Born: May 6, 1858 Davenport, Iowa, USA
- Died: May 1, 1931 (aged 72) Davenport, Iowa
- Party: Republican
- Profession: Attorney

Joseph Reed Lane (May 6, 1858 – May 1, 1931) was an attorney and a one-term Republican U.S. Representative from Iowa's 2nd congressional district at the close of the 19th century.

Lane was born in Davenport, Iowa, as the son of local attorney James T. Lane and his wife Annie. He attended the public schools in Davenport. He was graduated from Knox College, Galesburg, Illinois, in 1878 and from the University of Iowa College of Law at Iowa City, Iowa in 1880. He was admitted to the bar in the latter year and commenced practice in Davenport with his father's law firm, the predecessor to the Lane & Waterman firm. He served as a regent of the University of Iowa, and was a member of the Davenport City Council from 1884 to 1889.

In 1898, incumbent Republican Congressman George M. Curtis refused to run for a third term as representative of Iowa's 2nd congressional district, and no clear replacement as Republican nominee emerged prior to the party's district nominating convention. At that convention, Lane became a candidate and was chosen by acclamation. After defeating John J. Ney in the general election, Lane served in the Fifty-sixth Congress (March 4, 1899 – March 3, 1901).

In July 1900 he made the surprising announcement that would not seek re-election, citing personal and private business reasons. He resumed the practice of law in Davenport. He served as delegate to the Republican National Convention in 1908.

Lane died in Davenport on May 1, 1931. He was interred in Oakdale Cemetery.

U.S. House of Representatives
Preceded by George M. Curtis	Member of the U.S. House of Representatives from Iowa's 2nd congressional district March 4, 1899 – March 3, 1901	Succeeded by John N. W. Rumple
