= 31st Iowa Infantry Regiment =

- Iowa state flag
- Active: October 13, 1862, to June 27, 1865
- Country: United States
- Allegiance: Union
- Branch: Infantry
- Engagements: Siege of Vicksburg; Battle of Lookout Mountain; Battle of Missionary Ridge; Battle of Resaca; Battle of Kennesaw Mountain; Battle of Atlanta; Battle of Jonesboro; March to the Sea; Battle of Bentonville

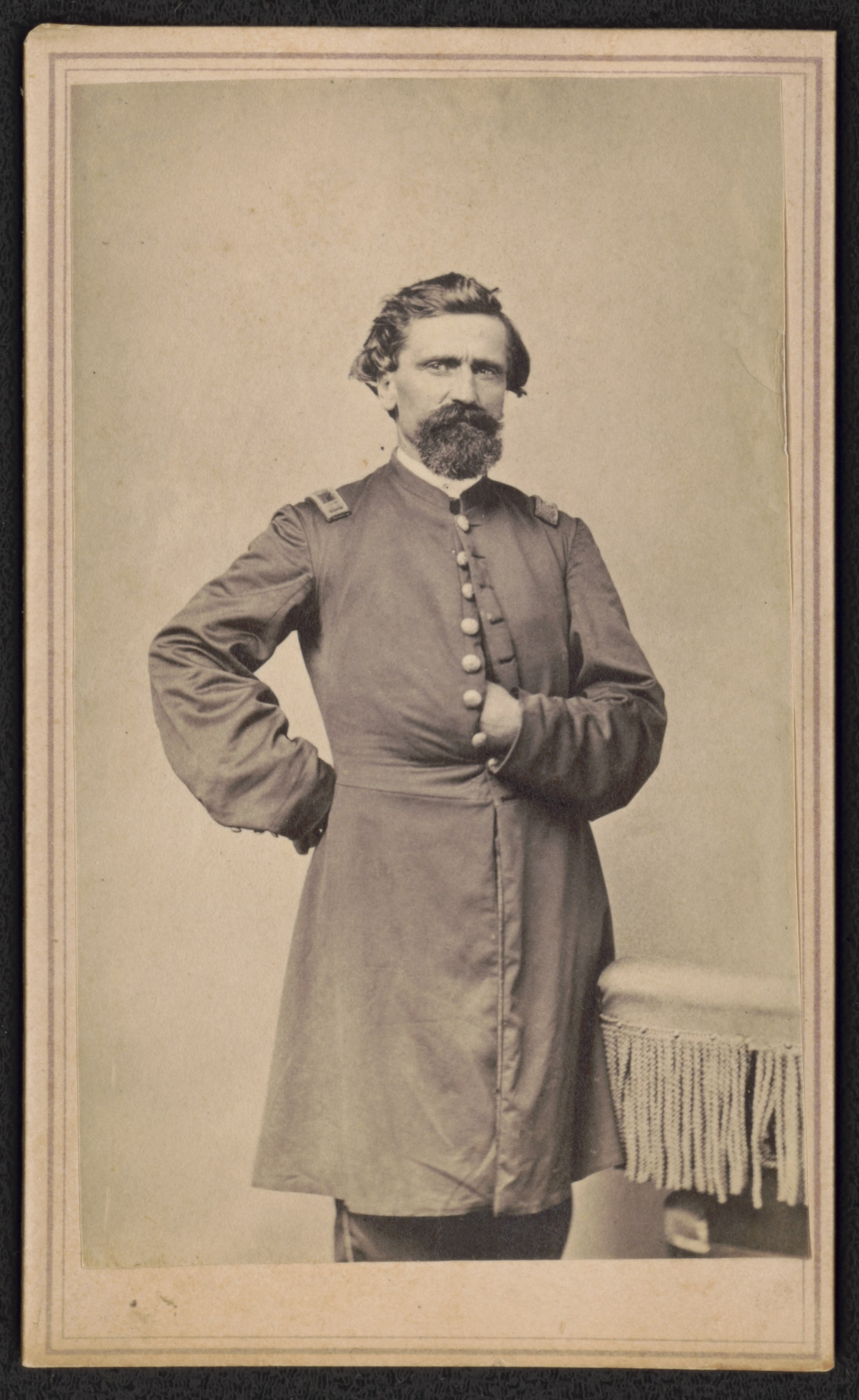
Captain Joseph H. Evans of Co. G, 31st Iowa Infantry Regiment. From the Liljenquist Family Collection of Civil War Photographs, Prints and Photographs Division, Library of Congress

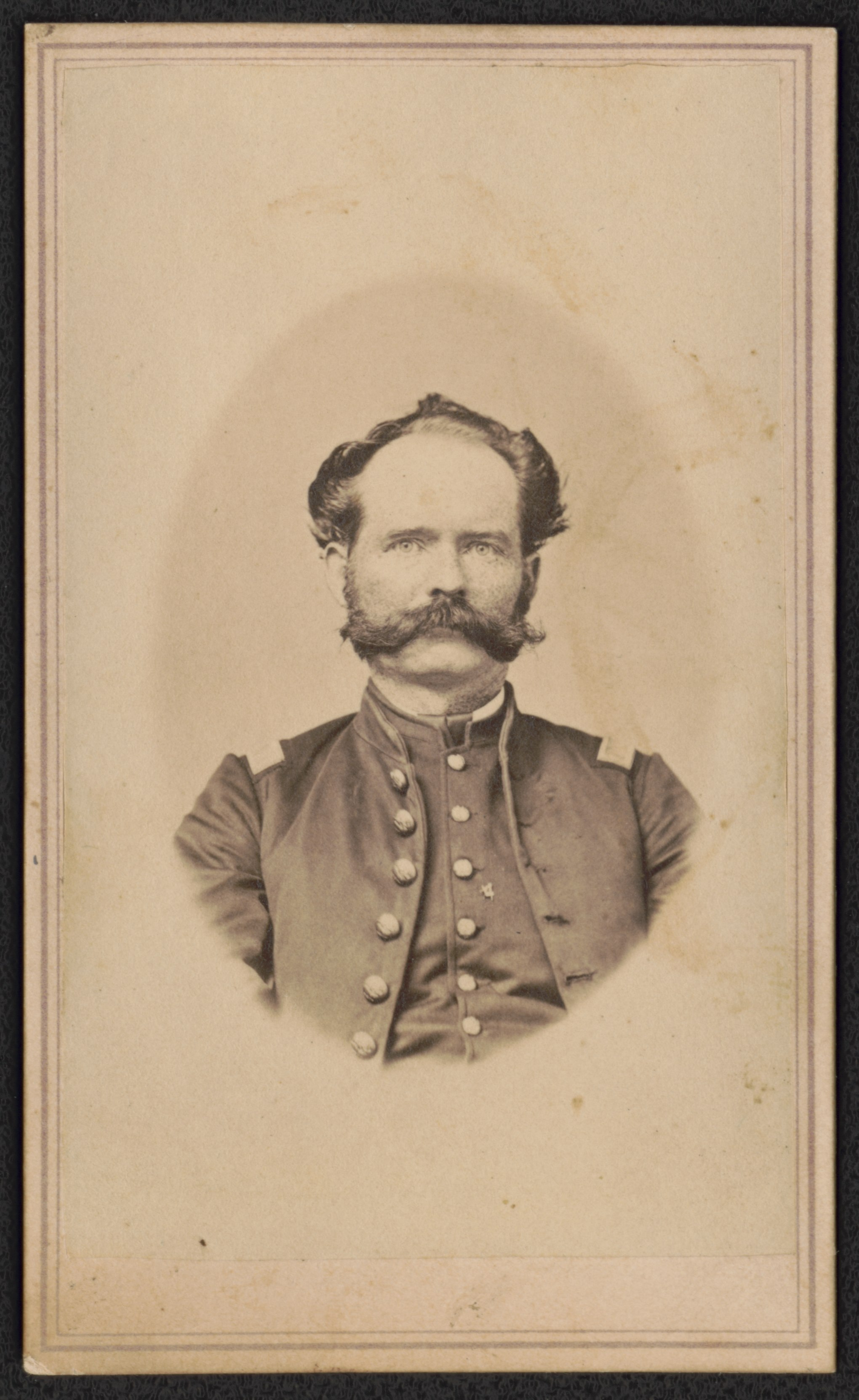
Lieutenant Thomas C. Bird of Co. C, 31st Iowa Infantry Regiment

The 31st Iowa Infantry Regiment was an infantry regiment that served in the Union Army during the American Civil War.

== Service ==
The 31st Iowa Infantry was organized at Davenport, Iowa and mustered in for three years of Federal service on October 13, 1862.

The regiment was mustered out on June 27, 1865.

== Total strength and casualties ==
A total of 1177 men served in the 31st Iowa at one time or another during its existence. It suffered 1 officer and 27 enlisted men who were killed in action or who died of their wounds and 3 officers and 272 enlisted men who died of disease, for a total of 303 fatalities.

== Commanders ==
- Colonel William Smyth
- Lieutenant Colonel Jeremiah W. Jenkins

== See also ==
- List of Iowa Civil War Units
- Iowa in the American Civil War
