= Irvin S. Pepper =

American politician from Iowa

Irvin St. Clair Pepper
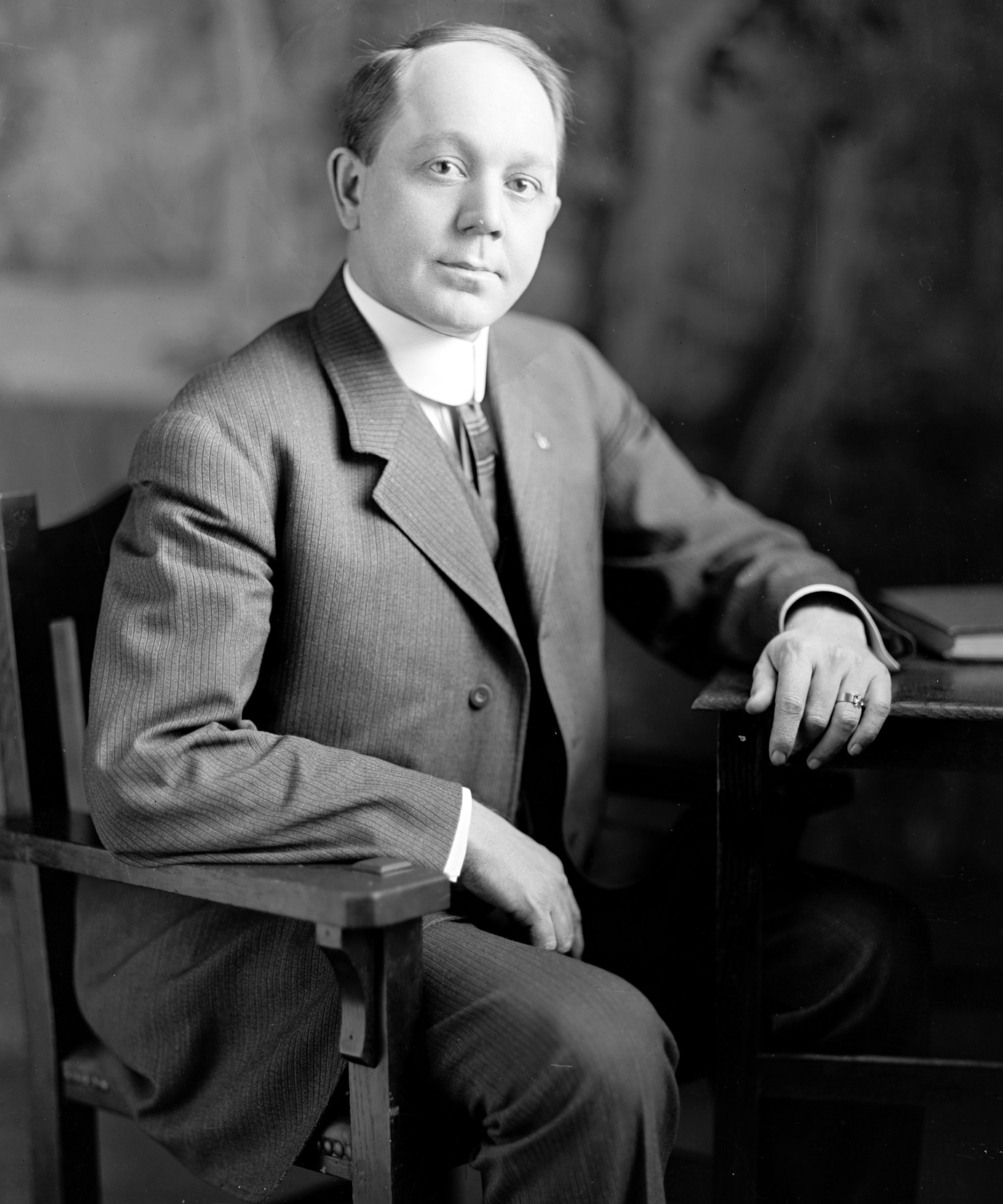

Member of the U.S. House of Representatives from Iowa's 2nd district
- In office March 4, 1911 – December 22, 1913
- Preceded by: Albert F. Dawson
- Succeeded by: Henry Vollmer

Personal details
- Born: June 10, 1876 Davis County, Iowa, U.S.
- Died: December 22, 1913 (aged 37) Clinton County, Iowa, U.S.
- Resting place: Shaul Cemetery, Ottumwa, Iowa, U.S.
- Party: Democratic

Irvin St. Clair Pepper (June 10, 1876 – December 22, 1913) was a Democratic U.S. representative from Iowa's 2nd congressional district.

Pepper was born on a farm in Davis County, Iowa. He attended public schools and graduated from Southern Iowa Normal School at Bloomfield in 1897. He later served as principal of the Atalissa, Iowa High School and of the Washington School at Muscatine, Iowa.

He relocated to Washington, D.C. to serve as secretary for Democratic Congressman Martin J. Wade of Iowa's 2nd congressional district from 1903 to 1905. In 1905, he graduated from the George Washington University Law School, in Washington. He was admitted to the bar the same year and returned to Muscatine to commence practice. He served as prosecuting attorney of Muscatine County from 1906 to 1910.

In 1910, Pepper ran as a Democrat for an open seat in the U.S. House to represent Iowa's 2nd congressional district. He won the Democratic nomination, then defeated Republican Charles Grilk in the general election. He was then re-elected two years later with "little opposition."

On December 22, 1913, part way through his second term, Pepper died following an operation for infection of the gall bladder. He was recovering in Clinton County, Iowa, from typhoid fever, which had left him in a weakened state.

In the Sixty-third Congresses, he served as chairman of the Committee on Expenditures in the Post Office Department. He also served as a member of the House Committee on Military Affairs. At the time of his death, he served as secretary of the Democratic National Congressional Committee. In all, he served from March 4, 1911 until his death.

Pepper had planned to enter the contest in Iowa for the U.S. Senate seat held by Albert B. Cummins, in what would be Iowa's first direct election of a U.S. Senator.

He was interred in Shaul Cemetery, near Ottumwa, Iowa.

== See also ==
- List of members of the United States Congress who died in office (1900–1949)

U.S. House of Representatives
Preceded by Albert F. Dawson	Member of the U.S. House of Representatives from Iowa's 2nd congressional district March 4, 1911 - December 22, 1913	Succeeded by Henry Vollmer
