= Keene, Ohio =

Unincorporated community in Ohio, U.S.

Coordinates: 40°20′42″N 81°52′05″W

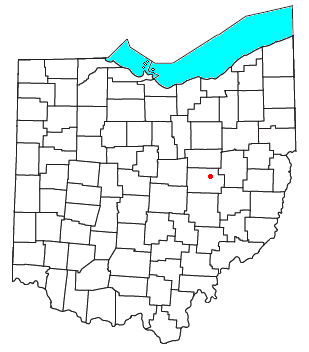
Location of Keene, Ohio

Keene is an unincorporated community in central Keene Township, Coshocton County, Ohio, United States. It has a post office with the ZIP code 43828.

== History ==
Keene was laid out in 1820. A large share of the early settlers being natives of Keene, New Hampshire, caused the name to be selected. A post office called Keene has been in operation since 1825.
