= Wickliffe Cotton =

American politician (1843–1912)

Member of the Iowa Senate from the 22nd district
- In office January 9, 1882 – January 10, 1886
- Preceded by: Nathaniel Anson Merrell
- Succeeded by: Patrick Bernard Wolfe

Personal details
- Born: February 2, 1843 Austintown, Ohio, U.S.
- Died: March 19, 1912 (aged 69) DeWitt, Iowa, U.S.
- Party: Republican
- Spouse: Mary Wallace (m. 1870; died 1910)
- Relations: Aylett R. Cotton (brother)

Wickliffe Albert Cotton (February 2, 1843 – March 19, 1912) was an American politician.

Wickliffe Cotton was born in Austintown, Ohio, on February 2, 1843. The Cotton family, including Wickliffe's older brother Aylett, moved to Clinton County, Iowa, the following year.

Wickliffe Cotton became a lawyer in Clinton County. Cotton was elected to a single four-year term on the Iowa Senate in 1881, representing District 22 as a Republican.

Cotton was married to Mary Wallace from September 21, 1870, to her death in 1910. He died in DeWitt on March 19, 1912.
