= John N. W. Rumple =

American politician (1841–1903)

John Nicholas William Rumple
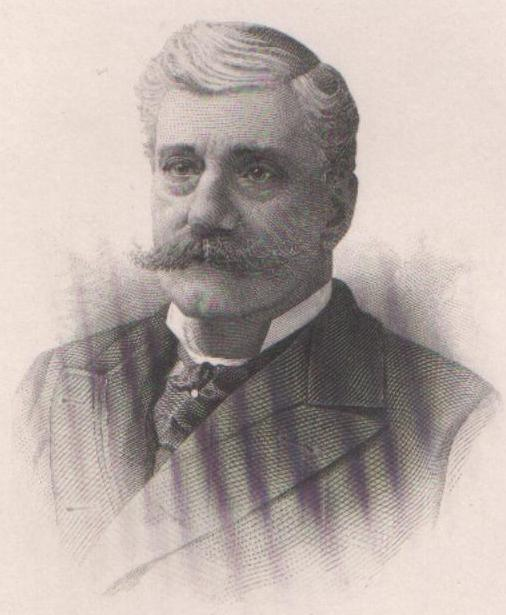
- Frontispiece of 1903's Memorial Addresses on the Life and Character of John N. W. Rumple.

Member of the U.S. House of Representatives from Iowa's 2nd district
- In office March 4, 1901 – January 31, 1903
- Preceded by: Joseph R. Lane
- Succeeded by: Martin J. Wade

Personal details
- Born: March 4, 1841 Near Fostoria, Ohio, U.S.
- Died: January 31, 1903 (aged 61) Chicago, Illinois, U.S.
- Resting place: Odd Fellows Cemetery, Marengo, Iowa, U.S.
- Party: Republican

John Nicholas William Rumple (March 4, 1841 – January 31, 1903) was a one-term Republican U.S. representative from Iowa's 2nd congressional district.

Born near Fostoria, Ohio, Rumple attended the public schools of Fostoria, Western College in Shueyville, Iowa, and the normal (teaching) department of the University of Iowa. In August 1861, following the outbreak of the American Civil War, he enlisted in Company H of the 2nd Regiment Iowa Volunteer Cavalry. He remained in the Army until October 1865, when mustered out as captain.

After studying law, he was admitted to the bar in 1867 and commenced practice in Marengo in Iowa County. In 1866 he married Addie M. Whiteling, who died in 1870. His second wife was Mary H. Shepard.

In 1873 he was elected to the Iowa Senate, where he served until 1878. He served as member of the Board of Regents of the University of Iowa from 1880 to 1886, and as curator of the State Historical Society of Iowa from 1881 to 1885. In Marengo, he served as a city council member, as mayor (from 1885 to 1886), and as city attorney (from 1896 to 1900). He also served as member of the local school board.

In 1900, Rumple was elected as a Republican to the U.S. House seat for Iowa's 2nd congressional district. He served in the Fifty-seventh Congress, but became seriously ill before the completion of his term. His illness prevented him from seeking re-election in 1902. Suffering from a cancerous tumor in his neck, he died on January 31, 1903, while hospitalized in Chicago, Illinois. He was interred in the Odd Fellows Cemetery in Marengo.

== See also ==
- List of members of the United States Congress who died in office (1900–1949)

== Sources ==
- United States Congress. "John N. W. Rumple (id: R000504)". Biographical Directory of the United States Congress.
- US House of Representatives (1903). Memorial Addresses on the Life and Character of John N. W. Rumple, Late a Representative from Iowa. 57th Cong., 2d sess. HouseDoc. No. 464. Washington, DC: US Government Printing Office.

U.S. House of Representatives
Preceded by Joseph R. Lane	Member of the U.S. House of Representatives from Iowa's 2nd congressional district March 4, 1901 – January 31, 1903	Succeeded by Martin J. Wade
