= Henry Vollmer =

American politician

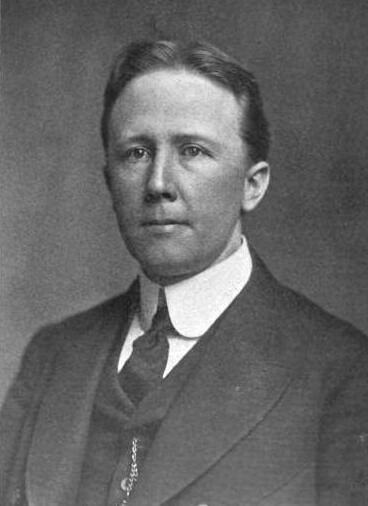

Member of the U.S. House of Representatives from Iowa's 2nd district
- In office February 10, 1914 – March 3, 1915
- Preceded by: Irvin S. Pepper
- Succeeded by: Harry E. Hull

Personal details
- Born: July 28, 1867 Davenport, Iowa, US
- Died: August 25, 1930 (aged 63)
- Resting place: Chapel of the Chimes, in Oakland, California
- Occupation: attorney

Henry Vollmer (July 28, 1867 – August 25, 1930) was an attorney and politician who served as the mayor of Davenport, Iowa, and as a Democratic U.S. Representative from Iowa's 2nd congressional district. Winning a special election in 1914, he served just over one year in Congress.

== Biography ==
Born in Davenport, Vollmer attended the public schools of Davenport. Following graduation from high school, he travelled to Washington, D.C. to work as a distributing clerk of the Fiftieth Congress in 1887 and 1888.

He studied law at the University of Iowa at Iowa City, Iowa, and Georgetown University in Washington, D.C.

=== Early career ===
He was admitted to the bar in 1889 and commenced practice in Davenport.

He served as member of the board of aldermen of Davenport in 1889, as mayor of Davenport from 1893 to 1897, and as a member of the board of education in Davenport from 1898 to 1901. He later became corporation counsel for Davenport in 1913 and 1914.

=== Congress ===
From 1911 to 1913, Iowa's 2nd congressional district was represented by Democrat Irvin S. Pepper. Pepper died on December 22, 1913, midway through his second term. In a special election held in February 1914, Vollmer defeated Republican Harry E. Hull, succeeding Pepper in the Sixty-third Congress. As a Congressman, Vollmer defended the Underwood Tariff, and opposed Prohibition.

Less than two months after winning the special election, Vollmer announced that he would not seek re-election in the regular election in November 1914. Vollmer attributed his decision to family considerations, but Republicans attributed it to the unpopularity in his district of the Underwood tariff. Hull would win the general election and succeed him. In all, Vollmer served from February 10, 1914, to March 3, 1915.

=== Later career ===
Vollmer resumed the practice of law, while remaining active in local and state democratic politics. He defended his brother, former county attorney Fred Vollmer, who had been indicted for allegedly assisting and abetting a conspiracy to violate the Espionage Act of 1917 by bringing a controversial League of Humanity speaker to Davenport soon after the United States entered World War I. The 1917 jury trial resulted in a hung jury, and on the retrial, Fred Vollmer pleaded guilty, paid a fine, and moved to the Los Angeles area.

Henry Vollmer's fiery speeches continued to attract criticism from his opponents and kudos from his supporters.

=== Death ===
He died in Piedmont, California, on August 25, 1930 at the age of 63. His remains were cremated and the ashes placed in a crypt in the California Crematorium, now the Chapel of the Chimes, in Oakland, California.

U.S. House of Representatives
Preceded by Irvin S. Pepper	Member of the U.S. House of Representatives from Iowa's 2nd congressional district February 10, 1914 - March 3, 1915	Succeeded by Harry E. Hull
