= George M. Curtis (Iowa politician) =

American politician (1844–1921)

George Curtis
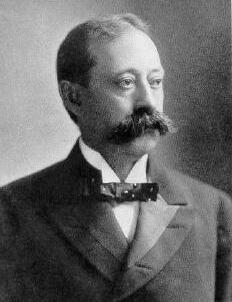

Member of the U.S. House of Representatives from Iowa's 2nd district
- In office March 4, 1895 – March 3, 1899
- Preceded by: Walter I. Hayes
- Succeeded by: Joseph R. Lane

Personal details
- Born: April 1, 1844 Oxford, New York, U.S.
- Died: February 9, 1921 (aged 76) Clinton, Iowa, U.S
- Party: Republican

George Martin Curtis (April 1, 1844 – February 9, 1921) was a two-term Republican U.S. Representative from Iowa's 2nd congressional district.

== Biography ==
Born near Oxford, New York, to John S. and Elizabeth (Carpenter) Curtis, Curtis moved to Ogle County, Illinois, in 1856 with his parents, who settled on a farm near Rochelle, Illinois. He attended the common schools and Rock River Seminary, in Mount Morris, Illinois. Curtis was a clerk in Rochelle from 1863 to 1865, and subsequently for two years in Cortland, Illinois. He moved to Clinton, Iowa, in 1867 and engaged in the manufacture of lumber, founding the Curtis Companies, a conglomerate of associated sash, door, and millwork companies that eventually consolidated into a single corporation based in Clinton, Iowa. He was also one of the incorporators of the City National Bank of Clinton in 1880. After initially serving as one of its directors, Curtis was elected vice president of the bank in 1890 and served in that capacity until his death. He also served as director in a number of lumber companies.

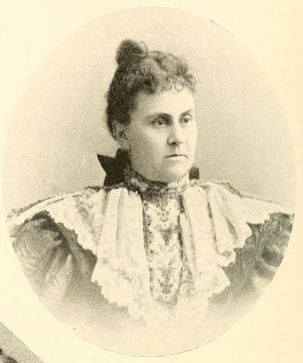
Etta Lewis

Hie wife was a native of the State of New York. She was the only child of William Lewis. Both parents died in her early childhood. An aunt adopted the orphan girl and took her to Michigan, where she was educated. When she was nineteen years of age, the family moved to Clinton, Iowa. Here she met George M. Curtis, an energetic young business man, afterward prominent in the political affairs of his state, and they were married. They had three sons and one daughter; the daughter and second son died when quite young. Lewis was a member of the Presbyterian church and deeply interested in church and benevolent work. As President of the Associated Benevolent Society of Clinton for five years, she was instrumental in doing much to alleviate the sufferings of the poor of that city.

In 1887, he was elected to the Iowa House of Representatives, serving in 1888 and 1889. He served as delegate to the 1892 Republican National Convention.

In 1894, Curtis was nominated to run as a Republican against incumbent Democratic Congressman Walter I. Hayes in Iowa's 2nd congressional district. After defeating Hayes, he served in the 54th United States Congress, then was re-elected two years later and served in the 55th United States Congress. He refused requests to be a candidate for renomination in 1898. In all, he served in Congress from March 4, 1895, to March 3, 1899.

He resumed his former business activities in Clinton, and died there on February 9, 1921. He was interred in Springdale Cemetery. His house in Clinton has been listed on the National Register of Historic Places.

U.S. House of Representatives
Preceded by Walter I. Hayes	Member of the U.S. House of Representatives from Iowa's 2nd congressional district March 4, 1895 – March 3, 1899	Succeeded by Joseph R. Lane
