= Iowa's 2nd congressional district =

U.S. House district for Iowa

Coordinates: 41°12′31″N 92°08′57″W

- Interactive map of district boundaries since January 3, 2023
- Representative: Ashley Hinson; R–Marion
- Distribution: 66.06% urban; 33.94% rural
- Population (2025): 797,024
- Median household income: $75,535
- Ethnicity: 85.9% White; 4.6% Black; 3.8% Hispanic; 3.3% Two or more races; 1.5% Asian; 0.8% other
- Cook PVI: R+4

Iowa's 2nd congressional district is a congressional district in the U.S. state of Iowa that covers most of its northeastern part. It includes Cedar Rapids, Dubuque, Mason City, Waverly, Waterloo, and Grinnell.

The district is represented by Republican Ashley Hinson, who is retiring from the House as of the end of her term to run for the U.S. Senate. Hinson lost the 2026 Senate election. Democrat Lindsay James won the open seat in the 2026 midterms and will replace Hinson on January 3, 2027.

== Recent election results from statewide races ==
Year	Office	Results
2008	President	Obama 58–40%
2012	President	Obama 56–44%
2016	President	Trump 49–44%
2016	Senate	Grassley 59–37%
2018	Governor	Hubbell 48.8–48.6%
2018	Secretary of State	Pate 52–46%
2018	Auditor	Sand 54–43%
2018	Treasurer	Fitzgerald 57–40%
2020	President	Trump 51–47%
2020	Senate	Ernst 50–47%
2022	Senate	Grassley 55–45%
2022	Governor	Reynolds 57–41%
2022	Secretary of State	Pate 59–41%
2022	Auditor	Sand 53–47%
2022	Treasurer	Smith 49.99–49.97%
2022	Attorney General	Miller 51–49%
2024	President	Trump 54–44%
2026	Senate	Turek 51–46%
2026	Governor	Sand 57–43%

== Composition ==
The 2nd district includes all of the following counties:

County	Seat	Population
Allamakee	Waukon	14,238
Benton	Vinton	26,004
Black Hawk	Waterloo	131,532
Bremer	Waverly	25,296
Buchanan	Independence	20,883
Butler	Allison	14,049
Cerro Gordo	Mason City	42,372
Chickasaw	New Hampton	11,663
Clayton	Elkader	16,845
Delaware	Manchester	17,674
Dubuque	Dubuque	99,381
Fayette	West Union	19,047
Floyd	Charles City	14,901
Grundy	Grundy Center	12,361
Hardin	Eldora	16,455
Howard	Cresco	9,415
Linn	Cedar Rapids	232,028
Mitchell	Osage	10,650
Poweshiek	Montezuma	18,368
Tama	Toledo	16,796
Winneshiek	Decorah	19,733
Worth	Northwood	7,338

== List of members representing the district ==
Member	Party	Term	Cong ress	Electoral history	Location
District created March 4, 1847
Shepherd Leffler (Burlington)	Democratic	March 4, 1847 – March 3, 1851	30th 31st	Redistricted from the at-large district and re-elected in 1846. Re-elected in 1848. Retired.	1847–1849 [data missing]
Shepherd Leffler (Burlington)	Democratic	March 4, 1847 – March 3, 1851	30th 31st	Redistricted from the at-large district and re-elected in 1846. Re-elected in 1848. Retired.	1849–1859 [data missing]
Lincoln Clark (Dubuque)	Democratic	March 4, 1851 – March 3, 1853	32nd	Elected in 1850. Lost re-election.	1849–1859 [data missing]
John P. Cook (Davenport)	Whig	March 4, 1853 – March 3, 1855	33rd	Elected in 1852. Retired.	1849–1859 [data missing]
James Thorington (Davenport)	Whig	March 4, 1855 – March 3, 1857	34th	Elected in 1854. Lost renomination.	1849–1859 [data missing]
Timothy Davis (Dubuque)	Republican	March 4, 1857 – March 3, 1859	35th	Elected in 1856. Retired.	1849–1859 [data missing]
William Vandever (Dubuque)	Republican	March 4, 1859 – March 3, 1863	36th 37th	Elected in 1858. Re-elected in 1860. Retired. (Note: Service effectively ended in 1861 when promoted to Major General, but did not officially resign.)	1859–1863 [data missing]
Hiram Price (Davenport)	Republican	March 4, 1863 – March 3, 1869	38th 39th 40th	Elected in 1862. Re-elected in 1864. Re-elected in 1866. Retired.	1863–1873 [data missing]
William Smyth (Marion)	Republican	March 4, 1869 – September 30, 1870	41st	Elected in 1868. Died.	1863–1873 [data missing]
Vacant		September 30, 1870 – December 6, 1870	41st		1863–1873 [data missing]
William P. Wolf (Tipton)	Republican	December 6, 1870 – March 3, 1871	41st	Elected to finish Smyth's term. Retired.	1863–1873 [data missing]
Aylett R. Cotton (Lyons)	Republican	March 4, 1871 – March 3, 1875	42nd 43rd	Elected in 1870. Re-elected in 1872. Lost renomination. (Note: Although his official congressional biography states he declined to run for a third term, newspaper reports indicate that he was an active but unsuccessful candidate for renomination.)	1863–1873 [data missing]
Aylett R. Cotton (Lyons)	Republican	March 4, 1871 – March 3, 1875	42nd 43rd	Elected in 1870. Re-elected in 1872. Lost renomination.	1873–1887; Cedar, Clinton, Jackson, Jones, Muscatine, and Scott counties
John Q. Tufts (Wilton Junction)	Republican	March 4, 1875 – March 3, 1877	44th	Elected in 1874. Retired.	1873–1887; Cedar, Clinton, Jackson, Jones, Muscatine, and Scott counties
Hiram Price (Davenport)	Republican	March 4, 1877 – March 3, 1881	45th 46th	Elected in 1876. Re-elected in 1878. Retired.	1873–1887; Cedar, Clinton, Jackson, Jones, Muscatine, and Scott counties
Sewall S. Farwell (Monticello)	Republican	March 4, 1881 – March 3, 1883	47th	Elected in 1880. Lost re-election.	1873–1887; Cedar, Clinton, Jackson, Jones, Muscatine, and Scott counties
Jeremiah H. Murphy (Davenport)	Democratic	March 4, 1883 – March 3, 1887	48th 49th	Elected in 1882. Re-elected in 1884. Lost renomination.	1873–1887; Cedar, Clinton, Jackson, Jones, Muscatine, and Scott counties
Walter I. Hayes (Clinton)	Democratic	March 4, 1887 – March 3, 1895	50th 51st 52nd 53rd	Elected in 1886. Re-elected in 1888. Re-elected in 1890. Re-elected in 1892. Lost re-election.	1887–1933; Clinton, Iowa, Jackson, Johnson, Muscatine, and Scott counties
George M. Curtis (Clinton)	Republican	March 4, 1895 – March 3, 1899	54th 55th	Elected in 1894. Re-elected in 1896. Retired.	1887–1933; Clinton, Iowa, Jackson, Johnson, Muscatine, and Scott counties
Joseph R. Lane (Davenport)	Republican	March 4, 1899 – March 3, 1901	56th	Elected in 1898. Retired.	1887–1933; Clinton, Iowa, Jackson, Johnson, Muscatine, and Scott counties
John N. W. Rumple (Marengo)	Republican	March 4, 1901 – January 31, 1903	57th	Elected in 1900. Retired and died before next term.	1887–1933; Clinton, Iowa, Jackson, Johnson, Muscatine, and Scott counties
Vacant		January 31, 1903 – March 3, 1903	57th		1887–1933; Clinton, Iowa, Jackson, Johnson, Muscatine, and Scott counties
Martin J. Wade (Iowa City)	Democratic	March 4, 1903 – March 3, 1905	58th	Elected in 1902. Lost re-election.	1887–1933; Clinton, Iowa, Jackson, Johnson, Muscatine, and Scott counties
Albert F. Dawson (Preston)	Republican	March 4, 1905 – March 3, 1911	59th 60th 61st	Elected in 1904. Re-elected in 1906. Re-elected in 1908. Retired.	1887–1933; Clinton, Iowa, Jackson, Johnson, Muscatine, and Scott counties
Irvin S. Pepper (Muscatine)	Democratic	March 4, 1911 – December 22, 1913	62nd 63rd	Elected in 1910. Re-elected in 1912. Died.	1887–1933; Clinton, Iowa, Jackson, Johnson, Muscatine, and Scott counties
Vacant		December 22, 1913 – February 10, 1914	63rd		1887–1933; Clinton, Iowa, Jackson, Johnson, Muscatine, and Scott counties
Henry Vollmer (Davenport)	Democratic	February 10, 1914 – March 3, 1915	63rd	Elected to finish Pepper's term. Retired.	1887–1933; Clinton, Iowa, Jackson, Johnson, Muscatine, and Scott counties
Harry E. Hull (Williamsburg)	Republican	March 4, 1915 – March 3, 1925	64th 65th 66th 67th 68th	Elected in 1914. Re-elected in 1916. Re-elected in 1918. Re-elected in 1920. Re-elected in 1922. Lost renomination.	1887–1933; Clinton, Iowa, Jackson, Johnson, Muscatine, and Scott counties
F. Dickinson Letts (Davenport)	Republican	March 4, 1925 – March 3, 1931	69th 70th 71st	Elected in 1924. Re-elected in 1926. Re-elected in 1928. Lost re-election.	1887–1933; Clinton, Iowa, Jackson, Johnson, Muscatine, and Scott counties
Bernhard M. Jacobsen (Clinton)	Democratic	March 4, 1931 – June 30, 1936	72nd 73rd 74th	Elected in 1930. Re-elected in 1932. Re-elected in 1934. Died.	1887–1933; Clinton, Iowa, Jackson, Johnson, Muscatine, and Scott counties
Bernhard M. Jacobsen (Clinton)	Democratic	March 4, 1931 – June 30, 1936	72nd 73rd 74th	Elected in 1930. Re-elected in 1932. Re-elected in 1934. Died.	1933–1943 [data missing]
Vacant		June 30, 1936 – January 3, 1937	74th		1933–1943 [data missing]
William S. Jacobsen (Clinton)	Democratic	January 3, 1937 – January 3, 1943	75th 76th 77th	Elected in 1936. Re-elected in 1938. Re-elected in 1940. Lost re-election.	1933–1943 [data missing]
Henry O. Talle (Decorah)	Republican	January 3, 1943 – January 3, 1959	78th 79th 80th 81st 82nd 83rd 84th 85th	Redistricted from the 4th district and re-elected in 1942. Re-elected in 1944. Re-elected in 1946. Re-elected in 1948. Re-elected in 1950. Re-elected in 1952. Re-elected in 1954. Re-elected in 1956. Lost re-election.	1943–1963 [data missing]
Leonard G. Wolf (Elkader)	Democratic	January 3, 1959 – January 3, 1961	86th	Elected in 1958. Lost re-election.	1943–1963 [data missing]
James E. Bromwell (Cedar Rapids)	Republican	January 3, 1961 – January 3, 1965	87th 88th	Elected in 1960. Re-elected in 1962. Lost re-election.	1943–1963 [data missing]
James E. Bromwell (Cedar Rapids)	Republican	January 3, 1961 – January 3, 1965	87th 88th	Elected in 1960. Re-elected in 1962. Lost re-election.	1963–1973 [data missing]
John Culver (Cedar Rapids)	Democratic	January 3, 1965 – January 3, 1975	89th 90th 91st 92nd 93rd	Elected in 1964. Re-elected in 1966. Re-elected in 1968. Re-elected in 1970. Re-elected in 1972. Retired to run for U.S. senator.	1963–1973 [data missing]
John Culver (Cedar Rapids)	Democratic	January 3, 1965 – January 3, 1975	89th 90th 91st 92nd 93rd	Elected in 1964. Re-elected in 1966. Re-elected in 1968. Re-elected in 1970. Re-elected in 1972. Retired to run for U.S. senator.	1973–1983 [data missing]
Mike Blouin (Dubuque)	Democratic	January 3, 1975 – January 3, 1979	94th 95th	Elected in 1974. Re-elected in 1976. Lost re-election.	1973–1983 [data missing]
Tom Tauke (Dubuque)	Republican	January 3, 1979 – January 3, 1991	96th 97th 98th 99th 100th 101st	Elected in 1978. Re-elected in 1980. Re-elected in 1982. Re-elected in 1984. Re-elected in 1986. Re-elected in 1988. Retired to run for U.S. senator.	1973–1983 [data missing]
Tom Tauke (Dubuque)	Republican	January 3, 1979 – January 3, 1991	96th 97th 98th 99th 100th 101st	Elected in 1978. Re-elected in 1980. Re-elected in 1982. Re-elected in 1984. Re-elected in 1986. Re-elected in 1988. Retired to run for U.S. senator.	1983–1993 [data missing]
Jim Nussle (Manchester)	Republican	January 3, 1991 – January 3, 2003	102nd 103rd 104th 105th 106th 107th	Elected in 1990. Re-elected in 1992. Re-elected in 1994. Re-elected in 1996. Re-elected in 1998. Re-elected in 2000. Redistricted to the 1st district.	1983–1993 [data missing]
Jim Nussle (Manchester)	Republican	January 3, 1991 – January 3, 2003	102nd 103rd 104th 105th 106th 107th	Elected in 1990. Re-elected in 1992. Re-elected in 1994. Re-elected in 1996. Re-elected in 1998. Re-elected in 2000. Redistricted to the 1st district.	1993–2003 [data missing]
Jim Leach (Davenport)	Republican	January 3, 2003 – January 3, 2007	108th 109th	Redistricted from the 1st district and re-elected in 2002. Re-elected in 2004. Lost re-election.	2003–2013
Dave Loebsack (Iowa City)	Democratic	January 3, 2007 – January 3, 2021	110th 111th 112th 113th 114th 115th 116th	Elected in 2006. Re-elected in 2008. Re-elected in 2010. Re-elected in 2012. Re-elected in 2014. Re-elected in 2016. Re-elected in 2018. Retired.	2003–2013
Dave Loebsack (Iowa City)	Democratic	January 3, 2007 – January 3, 2021	110th 111th 112th 113th 114th 115th 116th	Elected in 2006. Re-elected in 2008. Re-elected in 2010. Re-elected in 2012. Re-elected in 2014. Re-elected in 2016. Re-elected in 2018. Retired.	2013–2023
Mariannette Miller-Meeks (Ottumwa)	Republican	January 3, 2021 – January 3, 2023	117th	Elected in 2020. Redistricted to the 1st district.	2013–2023
Ashley Hinson (Marion)	Republican	January 3, 2023 – present	118th 119th	Redistricted from the 1st district and re-elected in 2022. Re-elected in 2024. Retired to run for U.S. Senate.	2023–present: northeast quadrant of the state
Lindsay James (Dubuque)	Democratic	Assuming office on January 3, 2027		Elected in 2026.	2023–present: northeast quadrant of the state

== Recent election results ==
=== 2020 ===
Iowa's 2nd congressional district election, 2020
Party	Candidate	Votes	%
Republican	Mariannette Miller-Meeks	196,964	49.912
Democratic	Rita Hart	196,958	49.910
Write-in		703	0.178
Total votes		394,625	100.0
Republican gain from Democratic			

=== 2022 ===
Iowa's 2nd congressional district election, 2022
Party	Candidate	Votes	%
Republican	Ashley Hinson (incumbent)	172,181	54.1
Democratic	Liz Mathis	145,940	45.8
Write-in		278	0.1
Total votes		318,399	100.0
Republican hold			

=== 2024 ===
2024 Iowa's 2nd congressional district election
Party	Candidate	Votes	%
Republican	Ashley Hinson (incumbent)	233,340	57.1
Democratic	Sarah Corkery	169,740	41.5
Independent	Jody Puffett	5,381	1.3
Write-in		341	0.1
Total votes		408,802	100.0
Republican hold			

=== 2026 ===
2026 Iowa's 2nd congressional district election
Party	Candidate	Votes	%
Democratic	Lindsay James	171,577	49.5
Republican	Joe Mitchell	157,775	45.5
Libertarian	Rick Stewart	9,505	2.7
Independent	Dave Bushaw	7,477	2.2
Write-in		226	0.1
Total votes		346,560	100.0
Democratic gain from Republican			

== Historical district boundaries ==
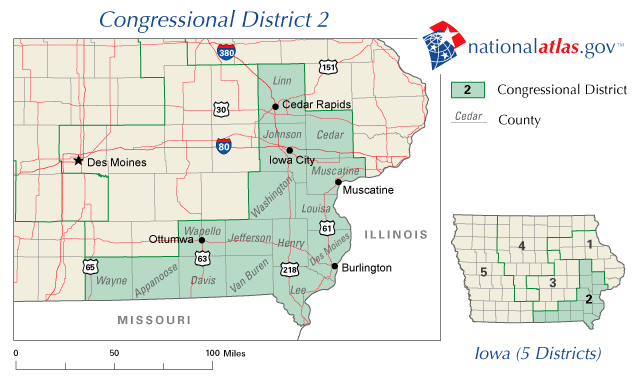
Iowa's 2nd congressional district boundaries from 2003 to 2013

== See also ==
- Iowa's congressional districts
- List of United States congressional districts
