= Granger (surname) =

Family name

Granger is a surname of English and French origin. It is an occupational name for a farm bailiff. The farm bailiff oversaw the collection of rent and taxes from the barns and storehouses of the lord of the manor. This officer's Anglo-Norman title was grainger, and Old French grangier, both from (Old) French grange with the suffix -er (Anglo-Norman, [Old] French) / -ier ([Old] French), grange "barn" is from unattested Vulgar Latin (Gaul Latin) *grānica, meaning "granary".

== People ==
- A. O. Granger (1846–1914), American industrialist and soldier
- Amos P. Granger (1789–1866), U.S. Representative from New York
- Ann Granger (1939–2025), British author
- Betty Granger, Canadian education figure
- Bill Granger (1969–2023), Australian chef
- Bradley F. Granger (1825–1882), U.S. Representative from Michigan
- Charles Granger (politician) (1912–1995), Canadian politician
- Charles Henry Granger (1812–1893), American artist
- Charles T. Granger (1835–1915), judge of the Iowa Supreme Court
- Clive Granger (1934–2009), British economist
- Daniel L. D. Granger (1852–1909), U.S. Representative from Rhode Island
- Danny Granger (born 1983), American basketball player
- David A. Granger (born 1945), Guyanese soldier
- David M. Granger, editor-in-chief of Esquire Magazine
- David Granger (bobsleigh) (1903–2002), American Olympic bobsledder
- David Granger (footballer) (born 1955), Australian rules footballer
- Dorothy Granger (1911–1995), American actress
- Édouard Rosset-Granger (1853-1934), French painter
- Ernest Granger (1844-1914), French politician
- Farley Granger (1925–2011), American actor
- Flavel K. Granger (1832–1905), American politician and farmer
- Francis Granger (1792–1868), U.S. Representative from New York
- Geddes Granger (1935–2016), Trinidad and Tobago politician
- Gideon Granger (1767–1822), American politician and lawyer
- Gilles-Gaston Granger (1920–2016), French philosopher
- Gordon Granger (1821–1876), U.S. soldier during the Civil War
- Hoyle Granger (born 1944), American football player
- James Granger (1723–1776), English author and clergyman
- Jean-Pierre Granger (1779–1840), French painter
- Jedediah W. Granger (1818–1902), American politician in Wisconsin
- Jeff Granger (born 1971), American baseball player
- Joaquim Granger (1928–2026), Portuguese gymnast
- John Granger, American author
- Kate Granger (1981–2016), English doctor who started the #hellomynameis campaign
- Kay Granger (1943–2026), U.S. Representative from Texas
- Keith Granger (born 1968), English footballer
- Kenneth Granger (born 1951), New Zealand rugby player
- Lester Granger (1896–1976), American civic leader
- Michael Granger (1923–1981), American actor
- Michael Granger (politician), American politician
- Michel Granger (born 1946), French painter
- Mick Granger (1931–2016), English footballer
- Mike Granger (born 1991), American sprinter
- Miles T. Granger (1817–1895), U.S. Representative from Connecticut
- Oliver Granger (1794–1841), U.S. Latter Day Saint figure
- Robert S. Granger (1816–1894), U.S. Army officer
- Scotty Granger (born 1987), American singer, songwriter, music producer
- Stewart Granger (1913–1993), English actor
- Stewart Granger (basketball) (born 1961), Canadian professional basketball player
- Tasmeen Granger (born 1994) Zimbabwean cricketer
- Thomas Granger (1625–1642), first person hanged in the Massachusetts Bay Colony
- Thomas Colpitts Granger (1802–1852), British Radical politician and barrister
- Ursula Granger (1738–1800), enslaved cook of Thomas Jefferson
- W. R. Granger (1873–1925), American-born Canadian sports administrator
- Walter K. Granger (1888–1978), U.S. politician
- Walter W. Granger (1872–1941), American vertebrate paleontologist
- Wayne Granger (born 1944), American professional baseball player

== Fictional characters ==
- Becky Granger, on the ITV1 soap opera Coronation Street
- Colby Granger, in the television show Numb3rs
- Dawn Granger, one of the characters who were Dove, a DC Comics superhero
- Emmet Granger, in Red Dead Redemption 2
- Granger, Montag's guide outside the city in Fahrenheit 451
- Geraldine Granger, in the British sitcom The Vicar of Dibley
- Hermione Granger, in J. K. Rowling's Harry Potter series
- Hiro Granger, in the anime and manga series of Beyblade
- Jack Granger, in the video game Command & Conquer 3: Tiberium Wars
- Lorelei Granger, in the book Frindle
- Terry Granger, in the 2014 film No Good Deed
- Tex Granger, in the 1948 Tex Granger movie serial
- Tyson Granger, in the anime and manga series of Beyblade

== See also ==
- Justice Granger (disambiguation)
- Senator Granger (disambiguation)
- Grainger (name)
