= Grainger (surname) =

Grainger is a surname of English origin. It is a variant of the surname Granger, which is an occupational name for a farm bailiff. The farm bailiff oversaw the collection of rent and taxes from the barns and storehouses of the lord of the manor. This officer's Anglo-Norman title was grainger, and Old French grangier, which are both derived from the Late Latin granicarius (a derivative of granica, meaning "granary").

== People ==
- Henry Allerdale Grainger (1848–1923), newspaper editor and politician in South Australia
- Brian Grainger (born 1983), American musician
- Charles F. Grainger American mayor
- Colin Grainger (1933–2022), English footballer
- Daniel Grainger (born 1986), English footballer
- David Liddell-Grainger (1930–2007), Scottish politician
- Esther Grainger (1912–1990), Welsh artist
- Gail Grainger (born 1954), English actress
- Gawn Grainger (1937–2025), Scottish actor, playwright and screenwriter
- George Grainger (cricketer) (1887–1977), English cricketer
- George Grainger (footballer) (1921–1998), Australian rules footballer
- George G. Grainger (1876–1944), American football player and coach
- Holliday Grainger (born 1988), English actress
- Jack Grainger (footballer, born 1912) (1912–1976), English professional (soccer) footballer
- Jack Grainger (footballer, born 1924) (1924–1983), English professional (soccer) footballer
- James Grainger (c. 1721–1766) Scottish poet and physician
- John Grainger (antiquarian) (1830–1891), Irish cleric and antiquarian
- John Grainger (politician) (c. 1803–1872), land owner and member of the South Australian Legislative Council
- John Harry Grainger (1854–1917), Australian architect and civil engineer
- Katherine Grainger (born 1975), Scottish Olympic rower
- Martin Allerdale Grainger (1874–1941), English born Canadian journalist, author, forester
- Martin Grainger (born 1972), English (soccer) football player
- Natalie Grainger (born 1977), English professional squash player
- Nicholas Grainger (born 1994), English swimmer
- Percy Grainger (1882–1961), Australian-born American composer and pianist
- Peter Grainger, pen name of Robert Partridge, English novelist
- Porter Grainger (1891–c.1955), African-American pianist, songwriter, playwright, and music publisher
- Richard Grainger, (1797–1861), British builder
- Roy Gordon Grainger (born 1962), New Zealand born, physicist
- Sally Grainger (fl. 2025), English food historian
- Sam Grainger, (1924–1986), American comic book artist
- Thomas Grainger, (1794–1852), English civil engineer
- W. W. Grainger (19??–19??), American founder of W.W. Grainger industrial supply company

== Fictional characters ==
- Chlo Grainger, on the television series Waterloo Road
- Mr. Ernest Grainger, on the television series Are You Being Served?
- Mika Grainger, on the television series Waterloo Road
- Scott Grainger, Sr., on the American soap opera The Young and the Restless

== See also ==
- Ian Liddell-Grainger, British, politician
