= Greiner =

Greiner may refer to:

- Greiner (surname), a surname
- USS Greiner (DE-37), an Evarts-class destroyer escort

== See also ==
- Grainer
- Greener (disambiguation)
- Greiner-Petter-Memm
