= William G. Donnan =

American politician

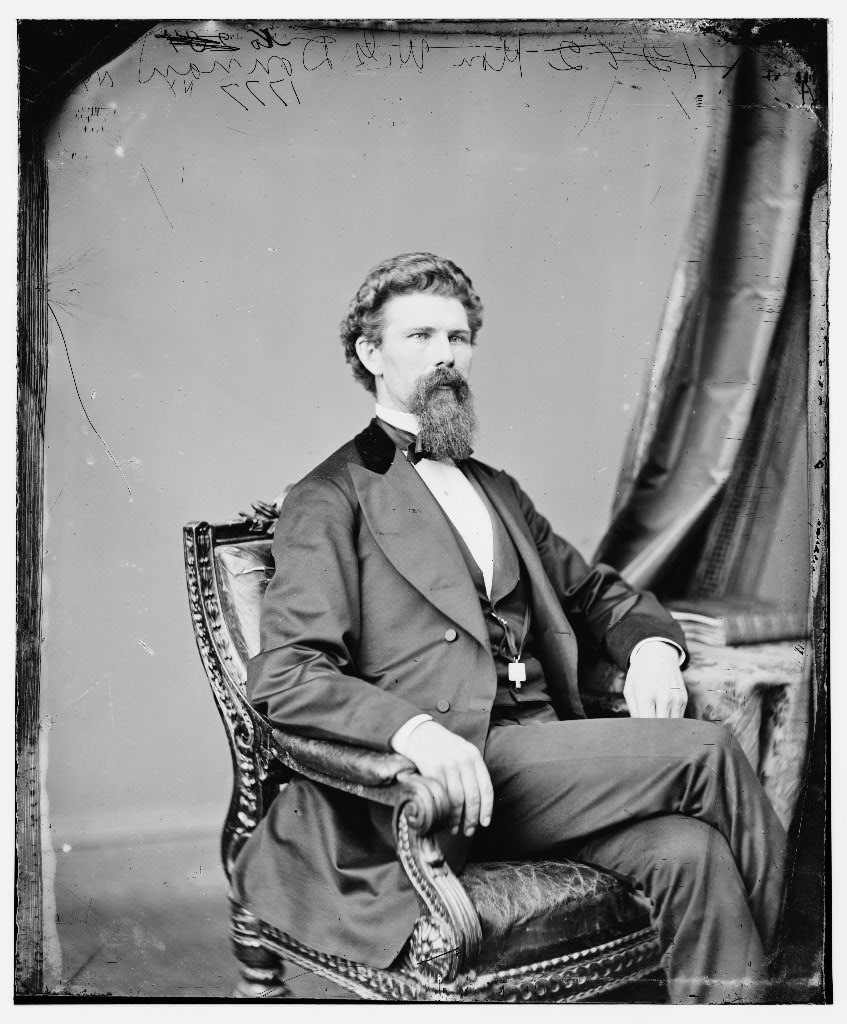

Member of the Iowa Senate
- In office 1868–1870
- In office 1884–1886

Member of the U.S. House of Representatives from Iowa's 3rd district
- In office March 4, 1871 – March 3, 1875
- Preceded by: William B. Allison
- Succeeded by: Lucien Lester Ainsworth

Personal details
- Born: William G. Donnan; June 30, 1834 Charlton, New York, U.S.
- Died: December 4, 1908 (aged 74) Independence, Iowa, U.S.
- Party: Republican
- Education: Union College
- Profession: Politician, lawyer

Military service
- Allegiance: United States
- Branch/service: United States Army
- Rank: Private
- Battles/wars: American Civil War

William G. Donnan (June 30, 1834 – December 4, 1908) was an American lawyer, Civil War officer, politician who served as a two-term Republican U.S. representative from Iowa's 3rd congressional district.

== Early life and education ==
Born in West Charlton, a hamlet in Saratoga County, New York, Donnan attended the district schools and Cambridge Academy. He graduated from Union College in Schenectady, New York, in 1856.

== Career ==
He moved to Independence, Iowa, in 1856. After studying law, he was admitted to the bar in 1856, and commenced practice at Independence in 1857. From 1857 to 1862, he was the treasurer and recorder of Buchanan County, Iowa.

In 1862, he entered the Union Army as a private in Company H, 27th Iowa Volunteer Infantry Regiment. He was promoted to the grade of first lieutenant and brevetted captain and major. He was adjutant on the staff of Gen. James Isham Gilbert. His hundred twenty-eight letters written to his wife Mary during the War are a valuable historical resource.

Following the war, he was elected to the Iowa Senate, initially serving in 1868 and 1870. He was largely instrumental in securing the establishment of the Mental Health Institute (formerly called the Iowa State Hospital for the Insane) at Independence.

In 1870, incumbent Republican Third District Congressman William B. Allison focused on winning election to the U.S. Senate, and thus declined to seek re-election to his House seat. Donnan was elected as a Republican to succeed him, serving in the 42nd United States Congress. Donnan was re-elected two years later (in 1872), to serve in the Forty-third Congress. He declined to be a candidate for reelection in 1874.

=== Later career ===
After his term ended, he resumed the practice of law at Independence, and remained active in politics. He was again elected to the Iowa Senate, serving from 1884 to 1886. He served as delegate-at-large to the 1884 Republican National Convention, and as chairman of the Republican State Central Committee from 1884 to 1886.

He later became president of the First National Bank of Independence.

== Death ==
He died in Independence, on December 4, 1908. He was interred in Oakwood Cemetery. The now-disincorporated town of Donnan, Iowa, in Fayette County was named for him.

U.S. House of Representatives
Preceded by William B. Allison	Member of the U.S. House of Representatives from Iowa's 3rd congressional district 1871–1875	Succeeded by Lucien L. Ainsworth
