= Charles Grainger =

Charles Grainger may refer to:

- Charles F. Grainger, mayor of Louisville, Kentucky
- Charles E. Grainger, American politician and journalist in Alabama
- Charles Grainger (cricketer), English cricketer and barrister
- Charlie Grainger, English footballer

== See also ==
- Charles Granger (disambiguation)
