= Grainer =

Grainer is a surname. Notable people with the surname include:

- Bill Grainer, American songwriter and producer
- Franz Grainer (1871–1948), German photographer
- Ron Grainer (1922–1981), UK-based Australian composer

== See also ==
- Grainger (surname)
- Rainer (surname)
