= Joseph M. Holbrook =

American politician

Joseph M. Holbrook (died 1884) was a member of the 20th Iowa House of Representatives in 1884. He died 17 days into the start of the session. He also served in the 27th Iowa Infantry Regiment during the American Civil War.
