= George Grainger =

George Grainger may refer to:

- George Grainger (cricketer) (1887–1977), English cricketer
- George Grainger (footballer) (1921–1998), Australian rules footballer
- George G. Grainger (1876–1944), American football player and coach
- Percy Grainger (George Percy Aldridge Grainger, 1882–1961), Australian-born composer, arranger and pianist
