= Charles Granger =

Charles Granger may refer to:

- Charles Henry Granger (1812–1893), American itinerant painter
- Charles T. Granger (1835–1915), American pioneer and judge
- Charles Granger (politician) (1912–1995), Canadian politician
