= Joseph Rea Reed =

American judge and politician (1835–1925)

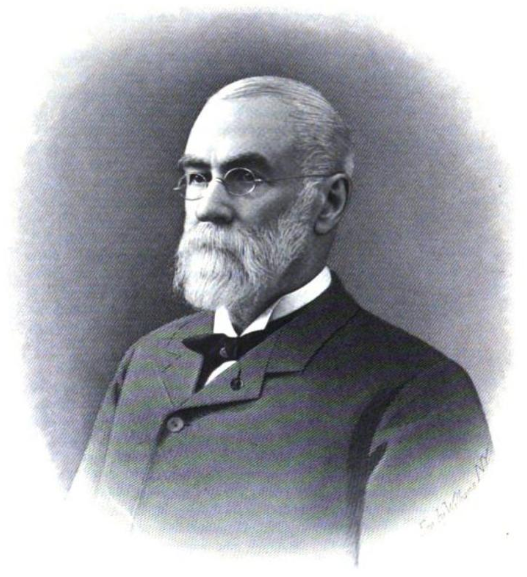

Chief Justice of Court of Private Land Claims
- In office June 1891 – 1894
- Appointed by: Benjamin Harrison

Member of the United States House of Representatives
- In office March 4, 1889 – March 3, 1891
- Preceded by: Joseph Lyman
- Succeeded by: Thomas Bowman
- Constituency: Iowa's 9th district

Chief Justice of the Iowa Supreme Court
- In office January 1, 1889 – February 28, 1889
- Preceded by: William H. Seevers
- Succeeded by: James H. Rothrock

Justice of the Iowa Supreme Court
- In office January 1, 1884 – February 28, 1889

Judge of Iowa's 13th Judicial District
- In office 1872 – January 1, 1884
- Appointed by: Cyrus C. Carpenter

Member of the Iowa Senate for the 21st District
- In office 1866–1870

Personal details
- Born: March 12, 1835 Ashland County, Ohio
- Died: April 2, 1925 (aged 90) Council Bluffs, Iowa
- Resting place: Walnut Hill Cemetery
- Party: Republican
- Occupation: Jurist, politician

Military service
- Branch/service: Union Army
- Years of service: July 1861–June 10, 1865
- Rank: Captain
- Unit: 2nd Iowa Independent Battery Light Artillery
- Battles/wars: Civil War

Joseph Rea Reed (March 12, 1835 – April 2, 1925) was an Iowa Supreme Court justice (also Chief Justice for 2 months), one-term Republican U.S. representative from Iowa's 9th congressional district in southwestern Iowa, and chief justice of a specialized federal court.

== Early life ==
Born in Ashland County, Ohio, Reed attended the common schools and Vermillion Institution in Hayesville, Ohio, from 1854 to 1857. He moved to Adel, Iowa, in 1857. After studying law, he was admitted to the bar in 1859 and engaged in the practice of law at Adel until 1861.

In July 1861, upon the outbreak of the American Civil War, Reed enlisted as first lieutenant in the 2nd Iowa Independent Battery Light Artillery. He was promoted to Captain in October 1864, and served until June 10, 1865. Following the war, he resumed the practice of law in Adel. He served as member of the Iowa Senate from 1866 to 1870, moving to Council Bluffs, Iowa, in 1869.

== Judicial career ==
In 1872, he was appointed by Governor Cyrus C. Carpenter as judge of the 13th district court from 1872 to 1884. He was then elevated to the Iowa Supreme Court, where he served from January 1, 1884, until he resigned on February 28, 1889, having been the chief justice from January 1, 1889 until his resignation.

== Congressional career ==
In 1888, Reed received the Republican nomination for election as the 9th congressional district's representative in the U.S. House, after incumbent Republican Joseph Lyman declined to seek a third term. After winning the general election, Reed served in the Fifty-first Congress. However, Reed was not re-elected, but was defeated in 1890 by Democrat Thomas Bowman as part of the Democrats' landslide victory.

== Post-Congressional career ==
In June 1891, he was named by President Benjamin Harrison as the chief justice of the new United States Court of Private Land Claims, a court created to decide land claims guaranteed by the Treaty of Guadalupe Hidalgo, in the territories of New Mexico, Arizona, and Utah, and in the states of Nevada, Colorado, and Wyoming. He served on that court from 1891 to 1904.

He then resumed the practice of law in Council Bluffs, where he died on April 2, 1925. He was interred in Walnut Hill Cemetery.

U.S. House of Representatives
Preceded by Joseph Lyman	Member of the U.S. House of Representatives from Iowa's 9th congressional district 1889–1891	Succeeded by Thomas Bowman
