= Justice Granger =

Justice Granger may refer to:

- Charles T. Granger (1835–1915), associate justice of the Iowa Supreme Court
- Miles T. Granger (1817–1895), judge of the Supreme Court of Errors (now the Supreme Court of Connecticut)
