= Emlin McClain =

Iowa Supreme Court justice (1851-1915)

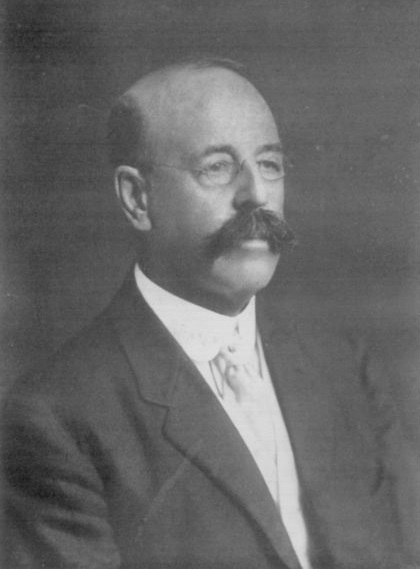

Justice of the Iowa Supreme Court
- In office January 1, 1901 – December 31, 1912

Personal details
- Born: November 26, 1851
- Died: May 25, 1915 (aged 63)

Emlin McClain (November 26, 1851 – May 25, 1915) was a justice of the Iowa Supreme Court from January 1, 1901, to December 31, 1912, appointed from Johnson County, Iowa.

Political offices
Preceded by Charles T. Granger	Justice of the Iowa Supreme Court; 1901–1912	Succeeded by
