= Theodore Weld Burdick =

American politician

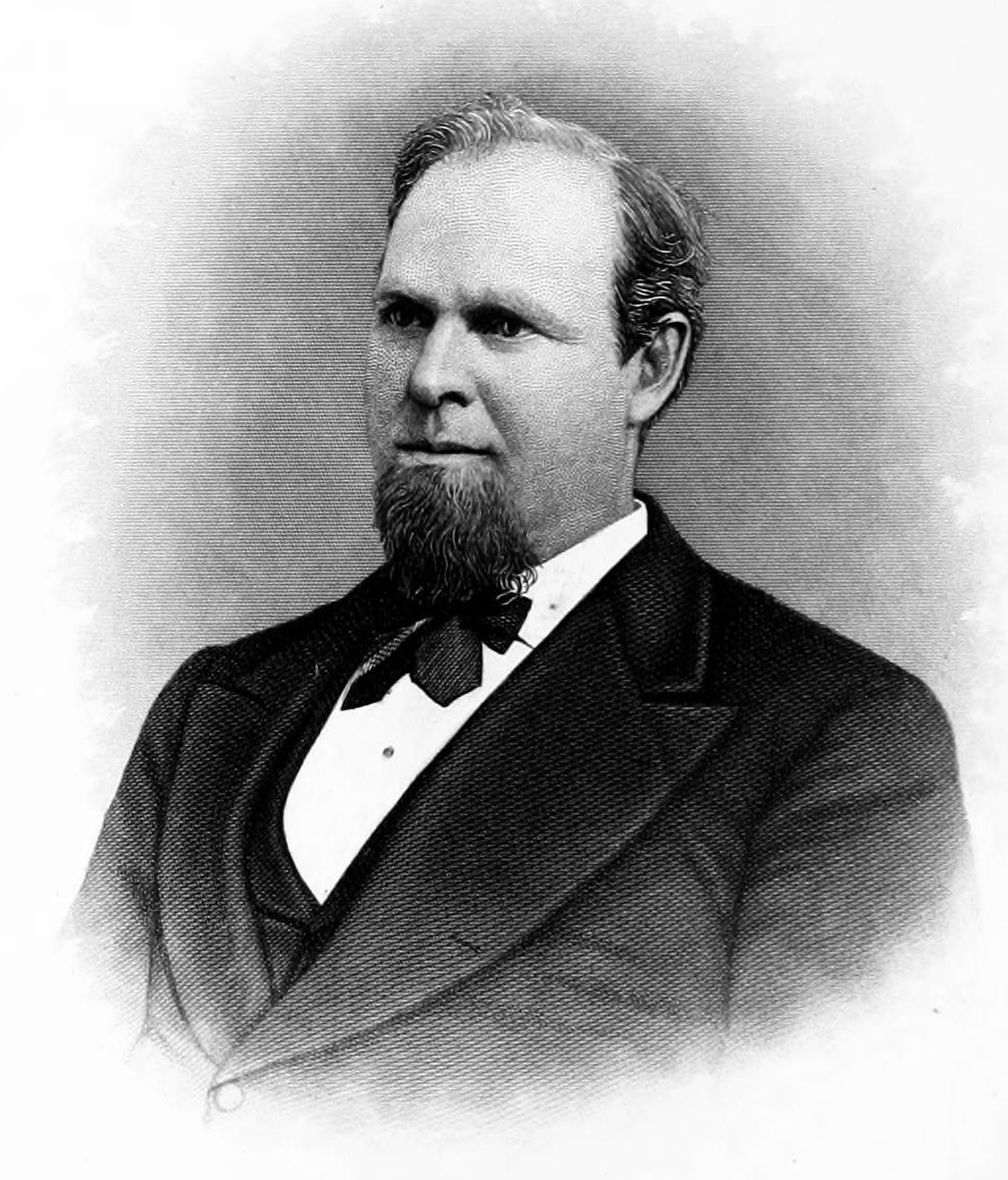

Member of the U.S. House of Representatives from Iowa's 3rd district
- In office March 4, 1877 – March 3, 1879
- Preceded by: Lucien L. Ainsworth
- Succeeded by: Thomas Updegraff

Member of the Iowa Senate
- In office 1886–1887

Personal details
- Born: October 7, 1836 Evansburg, Pennsylvania, U.S.
- Died: July 16, 1898 (aged 61) Decorah, Iowa, U.S.
- Resting place: Phelps Cemetery
- Party: Republican

Military service
- Branch/service: Union Army
- Rank: Captain
- Unit: Company D,6th Iowa Cavalry Regiment
- Battles/wars: Civil War

Theodore Weld Burdick (October 7, 1836 – July 16, 1898) was an American banker, Civil War veteran and politician who one term served as a Republican U.S. Representative from Iowa's 3rd congressional district, serving from 1877 to 1879.

== Biography ==
Born in Evansburg, Pennsylvania, Burdick attended the common schools. He moved with his parents to Decorah, Iowa, in 1853 and at age seventeen became the community's first schoolteacher.

He was a deputy treasurer and recorder of Winneshiek County from 1854 to 1857, and the treasurer and recorder from 1858 to 1862, when he resigned to recruit a company for the Union Army in the Civil War.

=== Civil War ===
He was commissioned as captain and assigned to Company D the 6th Regiment Iowa Volunteer Cavalry. He served for three years in the Department of the Northwest, in response to uprisings in southern Minnesota and Dakota Territory by Native Americans against settlers. After the regiment was mustered out in 1865 he returned to Decorah and became cashier of the First National Bank.

=== Congress ===
In 1876, Burdick was elected as a Republican to the Forty-fifth Congress, where he served from March 4, 1877 to March 3, 1879. He served on the House Committee on Expenditures. In 1878, he declined to be a candidate for renomination.

=== Later career ===
He resumed banking at Decorah, and Sault Ste. Marie, Michigan. He served as member of the Iowa Senate in 1886 and 1887.

=== Death and burial ===
He died in Decorah from July 16, 1898. He was interred in Phelps Cemetery.

U.S. House of Representatives
| Preceded by Lucien L. Ainsworth | Member of the U.S. House of Representatives from Iowa's 3rd congressional district 1877–1879 | Succeeded by Thomas Updegraff |
