= Chester C. Cole =

American judge (1824–1913)

Hon. Chester C. Cole
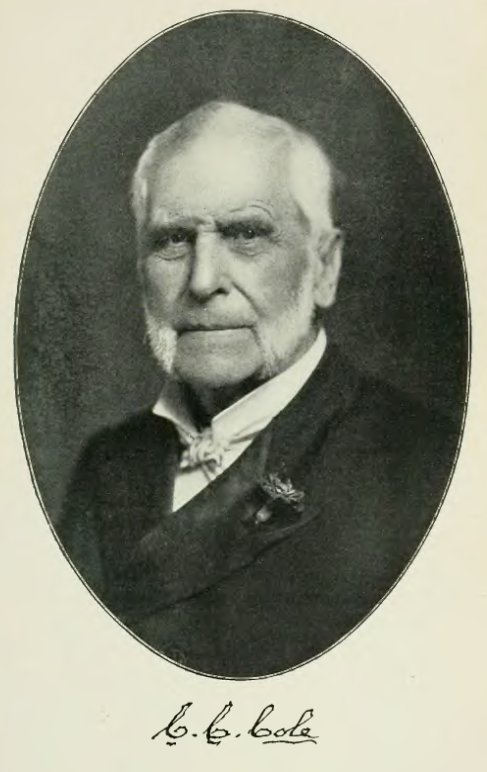
- Justice Chester C. Cole

11th Chief Justice of the Iowa Supreme Court
- In office January 1870 – January 1871
- Preceded by: John Forrest Dillon
- Succeeded by: William H. Seevers

Associate Justice of the Iowa Supreme Court
- In office March 1, 1864 – January 13, 1876
- Appointed by: Governor William M. Stone

Personal details
- Born: June 4, 1824 Oxford, New York, U.S.
- Died: October 4, 1913 (aged 89)
- Party: Republican
- Education: Harvard Law School
- Occupation: Law school dean, Iowa Supreme Court justice
- Profession: Lawyer, professor, college dean, judge
- Known for: Founder of law schools, civil rights cases

Chester Cicero Cole (4 June 1824 – 4 October 1913) was a justice of the Iowa Supreme Court from March 1, 1864 to January 19, 1876 appointed from Polk County, Iowa. He became chief justice in 1869. Cole was a founder of both Iowa law schools.

== Early life and family ==
He was born in Oxford, New York to Samuel Cole and his wife, Alice, (born Pullman). Cole graduated from Harvard Law School.

He married Miss Amanda M. Bennett on June 25, 1848, a daughter of Egbert and Gertrude Richtmyer Bennett The couple had seven children:

- Calvin S. — died young
- William Watson — married Frances Josephine Chapin, with whom he had three children. In 1888, he removed to Portland Ore where he was a lawyer and engaged in the lumber business; dying there November 17, 1894.
- Gertrude Alice — married railroad superintendent A. C. Atherton of Lewistown, Illinois, by whom she had three children
- Mary E. — married Des Moines lawyer D. C. McMartin, by whom she had four children; he died August 10, 1895
- Chester C. — died in infancy
- Frank B. — married Ella Jenkins, with whom he had two children; the couple resided in Havana, Illinois where Frank worked for the railroad
- Third daughter Carrie Stone married druggist J. R. Hurlbut of Hurlbut & McArthur, by whom she had one child

== Career ==
Following graduation, Cole practiced law in Marion, Kentucky, before moving to Iowa in 1857.

Cole's tenure on the Iowa Supreme Court began on March 1, 1864 and lasted until he resigned, effective Jan. 19, 1876. During this time, the court issued several important rulings supporting civil rights, including

- Clark v. Board of School Directors, finding school segregation unconstitutional and making Iowa the first court in the nation to issue such a ruling, predating, by 86 years, the landmark Supreme Court of the United States case Brown v. Board of Education.
- Smith v. The Directors of Ind. Sch. Dist. of Keokuk, 40 Iowa 518 (1875), where the court unanimously reaffirmed the Clark precedent and extended its scope to cover covert discrimination.
- The case of Arabella Mansfield, which made Iowa the first state to admit women to the practice of law.

With Justice George Grover Wright, Cole co-founded Iowa Law School in 1865, in Des Moines, which, in 1868, relocated to Iowa City, becoming the law department of the University of Iowa, later the University of Iowa College of Law.

In 1875, Cole left the University of Iowa and founded Iowa College of Law in Des Moines, which joined Drake University, upon its founding in 1881, later becoming Drake University Law School.

He is buried in Des Moines' Woodland Cemetery.

== See also ==
- Clark v. Board of School Directors

Political offices
| Preceded by | Justice of the Iowa Supreme Court; 1864–1876 | Succeeded by William H. Seevers |
