= Clark v. Board of School Directors =

Clark v. Board of Directors
- Court: Iowa Supreme Court
- Decided: June 1868
- Citation: 24 Iowa 266; 1868 Iowa Sup. LEXIS 17

Case history
- Appealed from: Muscatine District Court

Case opinions
- Segregation of schools on the basis of race violates the Iowa Constitution.
- Decision by: Chester C. Cole

Clark v. Board of School Directors, 24 Iowa 266 (1868), was an Iowa Supreme Court case in which the Court held that school districts may not segregate students on the basis of race. In 1867, Susan Clark, a 13-year-old African American, sued the local school board of Muscatine, Iowa, because she was refused admittance into Grammar School No. 2 under the notion that it was a white school only. Clark, the daughter of local businessman Alexander Clark, said in her lawsuit that the segregation was a violation of Iowa law and the Iowa State Constitution. Iowa trial court and state district court sided with Clark. On appeal, the Iowa Supreme Court upheld the district court's decision.

== History ==
The nation was still recovering from the Civil War when Clark v. Board of School Directors was argued in 1868, and the issue of "Negro suffrage" divided Iowans on party lines. Segregation was the norm and continued for decades after, but the decision of this case integrated Iowa schools almost a century before the landmark Brown v. Board of Education Supreme Court case in 1954.

In this case, it was decided twice that each school district in Iowa needed to provide education to all children in the district, and that they could discriminate based on location, but not on race. This started a long string of cases that found loopholes to get around laws against racial segregation in states where it was prohibited. Iowa’s Constitution stated that, in the words of Judge Chester C. Cole, “Provisions shall be made “for the education of all the youths of the State through a system of common schools,” which constitution declaration has been effectuated by enactments providing for the “instruction of youth between the ages of five and twenty-one years,” without regard to color or nationality, is it not equally clear that all discretion is denied to the board of school directors as to what youths shall be admitted? It seems to us that the proposition is too clear to admit of question."

Susan’s brother, Alexander Clark, Jr., went on to be the first black graduate of the College of Law at the University of Iowa; her father, Alexander Clark Sr., was the second.

== Facts ==
This case was about Susan Clark, a 13-year-old African-American girl from Muscatine, Iowa, who was told that she was not allowed to attend the local school in her neighborhood because it was for white children only. Clark sued the school board claiming that the school was violating Iowa's law and the state constitution by the way that they were segregating the school. The district court agreed with Clark that the school district was violating the state constitution, but the school board decided to appeal the decision to the state Supreme Court. The Supreme Court sustained the lower court ruling, striking down school segregation. Judge Chester C. Cole stayed with his decision that schools that were segregated were inconsistent with the Iowa constitution and that schools were required to educate all children. An important thing to note about this case is that on March 12, 1858, it was provided that the district board of directors "shall provide for the education of the colored youths in separate schools, except in cases where, by the unanimous consent of the persons sending to the school in the sub-district, they may be permitted to attend with the white youths." This act was, however, declared unconstitutional in December, 1858, by the Supreme Court, because the power to provide a system of education was given by the constitution to the board of education, and could not be primarily exercised by the general assembly.

== Ruling ==
The court sustained the ruling of the trial court which permitted Ms. Clark to attend "Grammar school No2". This ruling was substantial because it was the first court to argue that separate was not equal.

== Opinion ==
In the opinion of the court the Judge Chester C. Cole makes the argument that separate was not equal because he concluded that the people of color was just a separation of nationality. He then goes on to argue that if the board is to separate one nationality from the rest that they must then separate all people based on their nationality. As his argument progresses he states that all youths are equal before the law, that while school directors may have the ability to dictate school uniform they do not have the ability to say who can attend their school when the student meets all the necessary requirements.

=== Dissent ===
Judge George G. Wright stated that even though the constitution provided education for all the youths of the state, he believed that the school directors should have the overall say in arranging schools, and that they can direct where the children should attend schools provided that they are kept within their proper districts. He stated how he conceded that the law made no distinction as to the rights of children between the ages of five and twenty-one and how all people have the right to attend common schools. He believed that this right was recognized by the directors in this case and he stated “ I cannot admit that the refusal to admit this scholar into this particular school was so wrongful as that the courts should interfere by mandamus.” He also made it clear that if Susan was allowed to go to a school that was in the proper district, then he didn't know of any principle in which she could complain about. He believed that it was not Susan's or her father’s decision to make, but that it was the school board's decision.

== Commentary ==
The Drake Law Review published articles based on presentations at the “Clark 150” conference held at Drake University in 2018 observing the 150th anniversary of the 1868 landmark ruling by the Iowa Supreme Court.

== School named for Susan Clark ==
In 2019 the Board of Education of the Muscatine Community School District voted unanimously to name its newly combined middle schools for Susan V. Clark. Beginning in the 2020-2021 school year, the former West Middle School building will be the Susan Clark Junior High School.

== See also ==
- Maestas vs. George H. Shone
