= William H. Seevers =

American judge (1820–1895)

William Seevers

Chief Justice of the Iowa Supreme Court
- In office 1876, 1877 – December 31, 1888
- Succeeded by: Joseph R. Reed

Associate Justice of the Iowa Supreme Court
- In office February 17, 1876 – December 31, 1888
- Preceded by: Chester C. Cole
- Succeeded by: Charles T. Granger

Member of the Iowa House of Representatives
- In office January 10, 1876 – February 17, 1876
- In office January 12, 1858 – January 8, 1860

Judge of Iowa's 3rd District Court
- In office 1852–1857

Personal details
- Born: April 8, 1822 Shenandoah County, Virginia, US
- Died: March 25, 1895 (aged 72) Oskaloosa, Iowa, US
- Spouse: Caroline Malinda Lee (m. 1849)
- Children: 7

William Henry Seevers (1820–1895) was an Associate Justice and Chief Justice of the Iowa Supreme Court.

== Early life ==
Seevers was born in 1822 to James and Rebecca (Wilkins) Seevers in Shenandoah County, Virginia. He was one of 10 children. James was a Private in the War of 1812. In Clarke County, Virginia, he began to read law. James moved his family to Mahaska County, Iowa in 1843, and William followed on June 22, 1844.

== Legal career ==
Seevers was admitted to the bar in Mahaska County in 1846. He was one of the first lawyers in Mahaska County.

After being admitted to the bar, Seevers joined the practice of William T. Smith until 1852. He then partnered with his brother, James, under the name of William H. and James A. Seevers. Several years later, M. T. Williams joined their firm. During the American Civil War, his brother joined the military, the firm was renamed "Seevers and Williams". Later, after the dissolution of that firm, he partnered with M. E. Cutts until Seevers joined the State Supreme Court.

From 1848 to 1851, Seevers served as Prosecuting Attorney.

In 1873, Seevers was chosen to be a Code Commissioner to revise the laws of Iowa. This revised edition would be the Code of 1873.

== Judicial career ==
In 1852, Seevers was elected to be a District Court Judge until 1857.

Seevers served as a Justice on the Iowa State Supreme Court from February 17, 1876, to December 31, 1888, being appointed from Mahaska County, Iowa. He was also Chief Justice in 1876, 1882 and 1888.

== Political career ==
Seevers was elected to the Iowa House in the 1856 general election. He represented the district consisting Poweshiek County and Mahaska. He became the Chairman of the House Judiciary Committee.

In 1872, Seevers was a delegate for the Republican National Committee.

In 1875, Seevers was re-elected to the Iowa House, but resigned shortly after to accept appointment to the State Supreme Court.

== Personal life ==
On February 20, 1849, Seevers married Caroline M. Lee in Oskaloosa. They had 7 children.

Seevers died on March 25, 1895, aged 72, from a stroke, at his home in Oskaloosa. He was buried in Forest Cemetery. Caroline died in 1903.

Political offices
Preceded by Chester C. Cole	Justice of the Iowa Supreme Court; 1876–1888	Succeeded by Charles T. Granger
