= Walnut Hill Cemetery (Council Bluffs, Iowa) =

Cemetery in Pottawattamie County, Iowa

Coordinates: 41°16′17″N 95°49′27″W

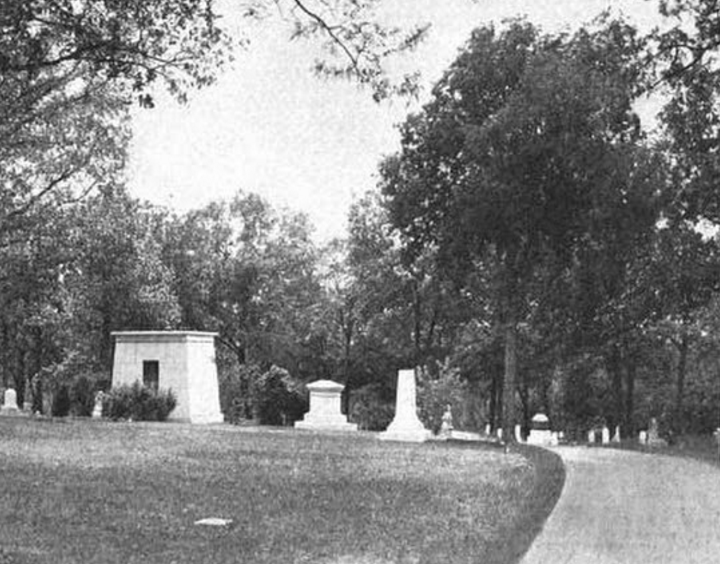
- Image described as a "choice section" of Walnut Hill Cemetery, Council Bluffs, Iowa, 1914.
- Interactive map of Walnut Hill Cemetery

Details
- Established: 1860
- Location: Council Bluffs, Iowa

Walnut Hill Cemetery is a cemetery located in Council Bluffs, Iowa. The land for the cemetery was platted in 1860, with thirty acres being dedicated to that purpose, and a major reorganization was carried out in the early 1910s.

Notable people interred there include Charles Edward Swanson (1879–1970), William Henry Mills Pusey (1826–1900), Joseph Rea Reed (1835–1925), and Grenville Mellen Dodge (1831–1916).
