= Joseph Lyman =

American politician

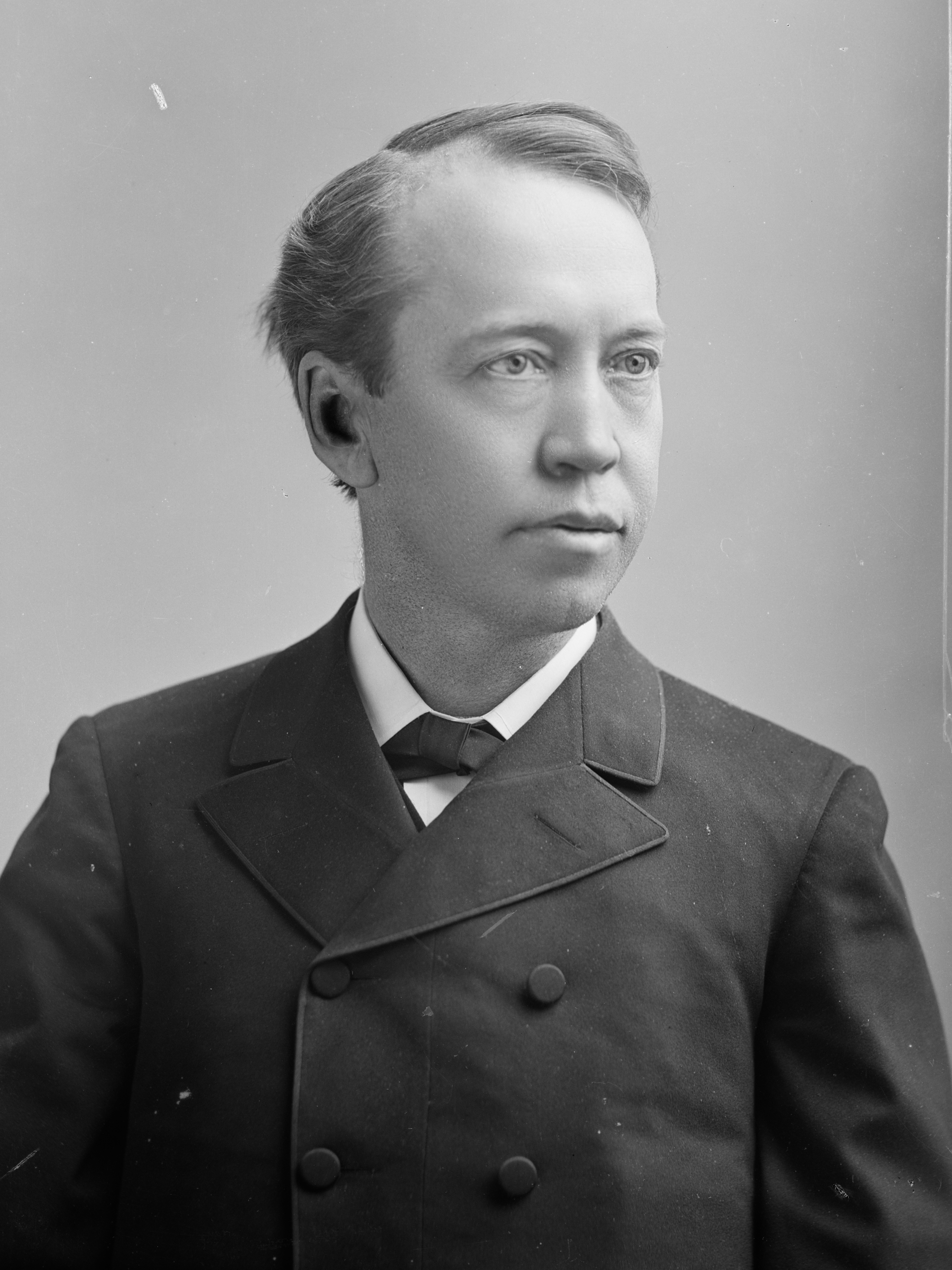

Member of the U.S. House of Representatives from Iowa's 9th district
- In office March 4, 1885 – March 3, 1889
- Preceded by: William H. M. Pusey
- Succeeded by: Joseph R. Reed

Personal details
- Born: September 13, 1840 Lyons, Michigan, U.S.
- Died: July 9, 1890 (aged 49) Council Bluffs, Iowa, U.S
- Party: Republican

Military service
- Branch/service: Union Army
- Years of service: 1861–1865
- Rank: Major
- Unit: Company E, 4th Iowa Cavalry Regiment; 29th Iowa Infantry Regiment
- Battles/wars: Civil War

Joseph Lyman (September 13, 1840 – July 9, 1890) was a Civil War soldier, lawyer, and judge. In the 1880s, he was a two-term Republican U.S. representative from Iowa's 9th congressional district in southwestern Iowa.

== Biography ==
Lyman was born in Lyons, Michigan, in Ionia County. After he attended the common schools in Ohio, he moved to Big Grove (later named Oakland), Iowa, in 1857. He then attended Iowa College (later named Grinnell College), in Grinnell, Iowa.

After the outbreak of the Civil War in 1861, Lyman enlisted in the Union Army. He initially served in Company E of the 4th Regiment Iowa Volunteer Cavalry. He later served as an adjutant of the 29th Iowa Volunteer Infantry Regiment, from October 19, 1862, to February 21, 1865, including service during 1864 as aide de camp and Inspector General on the staff of Brig. Gen. Samuel Allen Rice. He was a major of the same regiment and aide de camp and acting assistant adjutant general on the staff of Maj. Gen. Frederick Steele from February 21, 1865, to August 10, 1865.

After the war, he studied law, was admitted to the bar in 1866, and commenced practice in Council Bluffs, Iowa. He initially served as deputy collector of internal revenue of the fifth district of Iowa, from 1867 to 1870. Later in his legal career, he became a judge of the circuit court in 1884.

In 1884, he was elected as a Republican to the United States House of Representatives from Iowa's 9th congressional district, and served in the Forty-ninth U.S. Congress. Two years later, he was re-elected to a second term (in the Fiftieth U.S. Congress). However, he declined to be a candidate for renomination in 1888. In all, he served in Congress from March 4, 1885 to March 3, 1889.

Lyman resumed the practice of law in Council Bluffs, where he died of paralysis, after a long period of sickness. He was interred in Fairview Cemetery.

U.S. House of Representatives
Preceded by William H. M. Pusey	Member of the U.S. House of Representatives from Iowa's 9th congressional district 1885–1889	Succeeded by Joseph R. Reed
