= Adelaide Bowling Club =

Oldest lawn bowling club in South Australia

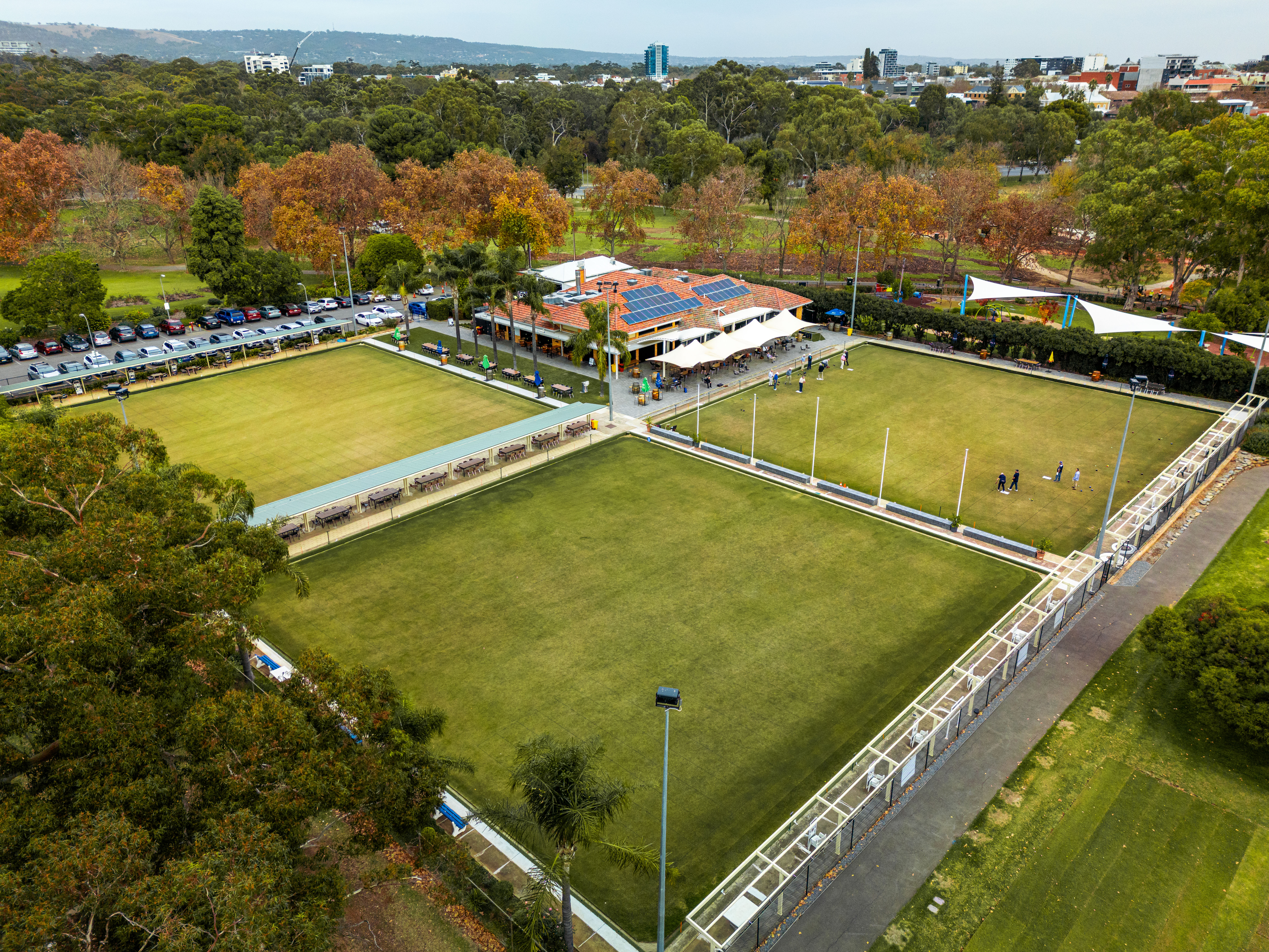
The Adelaide Bowling Club in its present location in the Eastern Parklands.

Adelaide Bowling Club was founded in 1897 and is the oldest bowling club in South Australia. The club remains active in local, regional, and national competitions, and has become a popular venue for functions and social events.

== Formation & History ==
The club was founded as the result of a public meeting called by Henry F. Dench and chaired by J. H. Finlayson. The Governor, Sir T. Fowell Buxton accepted the position of patron. Lavington Bonython, James Marshall, R. Kyffin Thomas, W. H. R. Porter, F. W. Thomas, F. Coombs, B. H. Pascoe, W. Thyer, F. W. Good, W. D. Reed, V. Lawrence, H. A. Grainger, F. A. Crump, J. H. Finlayson, and E. Eglinton were among the charter members. Sir Edwin T. Smith, Robert Barr Smith, William Gilbert, and A. H. Grainger were also among the founding members and supporters.

The first green was established on a plot 300 by 95 yards (274 by 87 m) behind Government House, North Terrace. Its location was later an impediment to a plan by the Adelaide City Council to extend Kintore Avenue through to Victoria Drive, and so provide another exit from the city and so reduce traffic congestion. For this reason, the club was moved to its present location in 1958.

== Present Day ==
The Club now has its premises within Rymill Park in the eastern parklands (with the entrance off Dequetteville Terrace). The ABC continues to compete in the Adelaide Metropolitan Bowls Association Pennant competition, most recently winning the Premier Division flag for season 2025/25, as well as owning the franchise for the Adelaide Pioneers in the national BPL competition.
