= Jedediah W. Granger =

19th century American politician

Member of the Wisconsin State Assembly from the Chippewa–Dunn district
- In office January 3, 1870 – January 2, 1871
- Preceded by: Thaddeus C. Pound
- Succeeded by: James A. Bate

Coroner of Allamakee County, Iowa
- In office January 1859 – January 1861
- Preceded by: F. W. Nottingham
- Succeeded by: John Ryan

Personal details
- Born: October 25, 1818 Sodus, New York, U.S.
- Died: August 17, 1902 (aged 83) Webster, South Dakota, U.S.
- Resting place: Webster Cemetery, Webster, South Dakota
- Spouse: Mary Baker (m. 1840; died 1882)
- Children: Robert E. Granger^{(b. 1843; died 1863)}; Charles Collins Granger^{(b. 1844; died 1881)}; Edmond Granger^{(b. 1846)}; Francis Edward Granger^{(b. 1847; died 1900)}; Eleanor Baker (Sutliff)^{(b. 1849; died 1927)}; Prudence Wilder (Wheeler)^{(b. 1852; died 1890)}; Mary E. Granger^{(b. 1858; died 1861)}
- Relatives: Charles T. Granger (first cousin); Gordon Granger (second cousin)
- Occupation: Farmer

Military service
- Allegiance: United States
- Branch/service: United States Volunteers; Union Army
- Years of service: 1862–1865
- Rank: 1st Lieutenant, USV
- Unit: 27th Reg. Iowa Vol. Infantry
- Battles/wars: American Civil War: Red River campaign; Franklin–Nashville campaign

Jedediah Wilder Granger (October 25, 1818 – August 17, 1902) was an American farmer, Republican politician, and pioneer settler of Iowa and South Dakota. He was a member of the Wisconsin State Assembly, representing Chippewa and Dunn counties in the 1870 session.

== Early life ==
Jedediah Granger was born in Sodus, New York, in October 1818. He was raised and educated in New York. After his marriage, in 1840, he moved west to Mackinac County, Michigan, where he worked in the logging industry as a surveyor and estimator.

In 1855, he moved to Allamakee County, Iowa, where he purchased a farm in Post Township. While living in Allamakee County, he became involved in local politics and was elected county coroner, serving from 1859 through 1861.

== Civil War service ==
In 1862, Granger volunteered for service in the Union Army and was commissioned first lieutenant in Company A, 27th Iowa Infantry Regiment. He was wounded at the Battle of Pleasant Hill in April 1864. Near the end of the war, he was designated for promotion to captain, but he was never mustered at that rank. He mustered out with the regiment in August 1865.

== Postbellum years ==
After returning from the war, Granger moved to Dunn County, Wisconsin. He established a farm in the town of New Haven and was soon elected to the county board of supervisors. In 1869, he was elected to the Wisconsin State Assembly, running on the Republican Party ticket. He represented both Dunn County and neighboring Chippewa County. After his legislative term, he relocated to a farm in the town of Tiffany, Wisconsin. He worked as a census-taker in Dunn County for the 1880 United States census.

After the death of his wife in 1882, Granger sold his property in Wisconsin and moved west to a farm in Webster, Dakota Territory, where he remained for the rest of his life.

He died at his farm in Webster on August 17, 1902.

== Personal life and family ==
Jedediah Wilder Granger was named for his uncle Jedediah Wilder. Iowa Supreme Court justice Charles T. Granger was a first cousin and was also an officer of the 27th Iowa Infantry Regiment during the war. Union Army general Gordon Granger was a second cousin. The Grangers were descendants of Launcelot Granger, who was kidnapped as a child from England and brought to the Massachusetts Bay Colony as an indentured servant in the 1640s.

Jedediah Granger married Mary Baker, of Greene County, New York, on February 2, 1840. He and his wife had ten children, but only one child outlived them.

Their eldest son Robert E. Granger enrolled as a private in the 1st Iowa Cavalry Regiment and was mortally wounded at the Battle of Bayou Meto, in Arkansas; he was 20 years old.

Their second son, Charles, also enrolled with the 1st Iowa Cavalry and survived the entire war, mustering out in 1865.

Wisconsin State Assembly
Preceded by Thaddeus C. Pound	Member of the Wisconsin State Assembly for the Chippewa–Dunn district January 3, 1870 – January 2, 1871	Succeeded by James A. Bate
