= Greiner (surname) =

Greiner is a surname, and may refer to:

== In arts and entertainment ==
- Gotthelf Greiner (1732–1797), German glass-maker, inventor of modern porcelain
- Josef Greiner (c. 1886–1947), Austrian writer
- Lori Greiner (born 1969), American inventor and TV personality
- Matt Greiner (born 1985), American metalcore drummer
- Otto Greiner (1869–1916), German painter
- Stefan-Peter Greiner (born 1966), German violin-maker
- Virginie Greiner (born 1969), French comic book scriptwriter
- William Greiner (born 1957), American photographer and painter

== In government, military, and politics ==
- Heinz Greiner (1895–1977), German Army General
- Hermann Greiner (1920–2014), German Luftwaffe ace
- Jon J. Greiner (21st century), American politician
- Karin Greiner (born 1967), Austrian politician
- Kathryn Greiner (born 1946), Australian politician
- Nick Greiner (born 1947), Australian politician
- Sandy Greiner (born 1945), American politician
- Theodor Ludwig Greiner, German revolutionary
- William P. Greiner, New York state legislator 1914–1916
- Willy Greiner (1919–2000), Norwegian politician

== In science ==
- Helen Greiner (born 1967), American roboticist
- Larry E. Greiner (1933–2013), American economist and academic
- Ludwig Greiner (1796–1882), German-Austrian forester
- Markus Greiner (born 1973), German physicist
- Walter Greiner (1935–2016), German physicist

== In sport ==
- Arthur Greiner (1884–1916), American racecar driver
- Cindy Greiner (born 1957), American heptathlete
- Frank Greiner (born 1966), German football coach
- Grayson Greiner (born 1992), American baseball player
- Harold Greiner (1907-1993), American baseball manager and restaurant entrepreneur
- Holden Greiner (born 1991), American basketball player
- Janine Greiner (born 1981), Swiss curler
- Matthew Greiner (born 2003), American Luge Athlete
- Robin Greiner (1932–2021), American pair skater
- Thomas Greiner (born 1963), German rower

== In other fields ==
- Bill Greiner (1934–2009), American university president
- Harold Greiner (1907–1993), American baseball manager and restaurant entrepreneur
- Justine Greiner (born 1963), American model
- Lori Greiner (born 1969), American inventor and TV personality
- Russell Greiner, Canadian computer science professor
