= Thomas Bowman (Iowa politician) =

American politician (1848–1917)

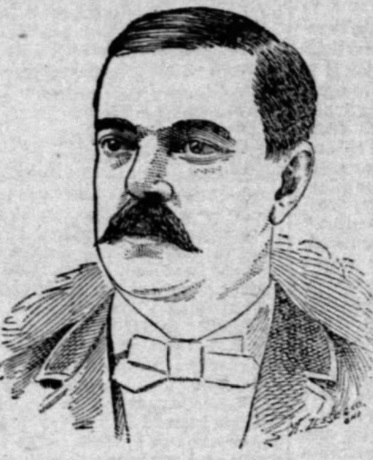

Member of the U.S. House of Representatives from Iowa's 9th district
- In office March 4, 1891 – March 4, 1893
- Preceded by: Charles M. La Follette
- Succeeded by: Winfield K. Denton

Personal details
- Born: May 25, 1848 Wiscasset, Maine, U.S.
- Died: December 1, 1917 (aged 69) Council Bluffs, Iowa, U.S
- Party: Democratic

Thomas Bowman (May 25, 1848 – December 1, 1917) was a local official, newspaper publisher, and one-term Democratic U.S. representative from Iowa's 9th congressional district. Benefiting from an electoral backlash in 1890 against Republicans for their support of the McKinley Tariff, Bowman's election was a rare nineteenth century Democratic win in traditionally Republican southwestern Iowa.

Born in Wiscasset, Maine, Bowman moved to Council Bluffs, Iowa, in 1868. A bachelor, he engaged in mercantile pursuits. In 1875, 1877 and 1879 he was elected treasurer of Pottawattamie County. He served as mayor of Council Bluffs in 1882.

In 1883, he purchased a controlling ownership of the Council Bluffs Globe newspaper. Under his ownership, the Globe identified itself as a Democratic newspaper. While publishing and editing the Globe, he was appointed postmaster of Council Bluffs in 1885, serving until his resignation in 1889.

In 1890 two Democrats other than Bowman ran for their party's nomination for the U.S. House seat then held by Republican Joseph Rea Reed. However, at the 9th district's convention, Bowman was drafted and nominated instead. After defeating Reed in the general election as part the Democratic Party's first nationwide congressional landslide against the Republican Party (and first majority in Iowa's House delegation), Bowman served in the Fifty-second Congress. He was not a candidate for renomination in 1892, explaining that "my private business demands my undivided attention and I can only continue in public office at a great personal sacrifice." In all, he served in Congress from March 4, 1891 to March 3, 1893.

After returning to Council Bluffs and the Globe, he was again the postmaster of Council Bluffs from 1904 to 1908. He also engaged in railroad contracting.

Bowman died in Council Bluffs, on December 1, 1917. He was interred in Pine Grove Cemetery in Dresden Mills, Maine.

== See also ==
- List of mayors of Council Bluffs, Iowa

U.S. House of Representatives
| Preceded by Joseph R. Reed | Member of the U.S. House of Representatives from Iowa's 9th congressional district 1891–1893 | Succeeded by Alva L. Hager |
