= Nathan Pusey (politician) =

American politician (1841–1922)

Nathan Marsh Pusey (21 June 1841 – 9 October 1922) was an American politician.

Pusey was born on 21 June 1841 in Washington County, Pennsylvania. His family moved to Baltimore when he was eight years old, where he attended the Light Street Institute, a private school run by Ashbury Morgan. He read law with Henry Stockbridge Sr., the father of Henry Stockbridge Jr., then, in 1864, received a license to practice law in Maryland. Pusey remained in Baltimore until 1878, when he moved to Council Bluffs, Iowa. Between 1882 and 1892, Pusey worked alongside W. F. Sapp, at the Sapp & Pusey law firm. Pusey, a Republican, served on the Iowa Senate for District 19 from 1896 to 1900.

Nathan Marsh Pusey married Gertrude Morgan in 1865. His older brother William Henry Mills Pusey was an Iowa state senator from 1858 to 1862, and represented Iowa's 9th congressional district in the United States House of Representatives from 1883 to 1885. Nathan Marsh Pusey died in Council Bluffs on 9 October 1922.
