= Woodsmen of the West =

1908 novel by Martin Allerdale Grainger

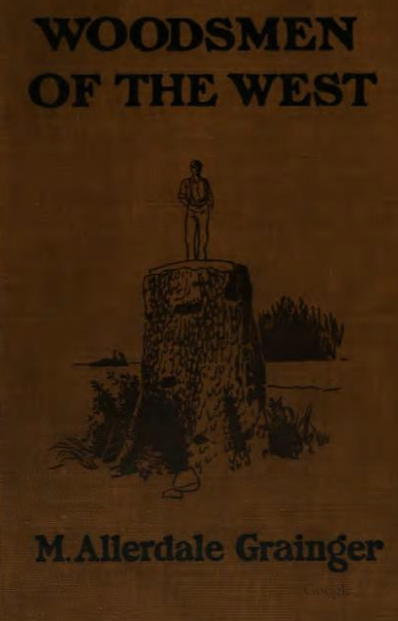
- Author: Martin Allerdale Grainger
- Language: English
- Genre: Novel
- Publisher: Edward Arnold
- Publication date: 1908
- Publication place: Canada
- Media type: Print (hardcover)
- Pages: 224 (New Canadian Library edition)

Woodsmen of the West is a novel by Martin Allerdale Grainger, first published in 1908 by Edward Arnold. In writing the novel, Grainger drew on his experiences as a logger working in the coastal forests of British Columbia, Canada.

Woodsmen of the West is one of the first examples of realism in western Canadian literature. Grainger based his novel on his unsentimental account of life in the logging camps. This way of writing gave the story a rough edge that was unusual fare for Canadian readers. It is a "dramatic and loosely structured tale... at heart a love story." It also paints the picture of a logging operator both obsessed with the lumber trade and with his own power. The accuracy of detail in Grainger's work has led it to be called "one of the finest examples of local realism in Canadian writing."

== A review ==
I have just had the pleasure, through the courtesy of Mr. H. Allerdale Grainger, of reading an entertaining book written by his son, Mr. M. Allerdale Grainger. It is entitled Woodsmen of the West, is dedicated 'to my creditors affectionately,' deals with actual life in the Canadian woods, and describes vividly typical characters among the loggers. One Carter is the principal character — a compound of the heroic and the mean. One or two brief extracts will indicate the hereditary quality of the Grainger pen — shrewd, satiric, pungent, biting, and withal frank and kindly :

Carter's Philosophy : — ' Buy from them as has got to sell and sell to them that's obliged to buy and cinch 'em all good and hard — that's all the secret there is to business.' There was a certain narrow shrewdness, however, in Carter's careless methods. For these methods had the effect of encouraging carelessness in the men he dealt with. Hand-loggers around the inlet. for example, would never know how much Carter was charging them for food and tools nor how much he would, in the end, pay them for their logs.

Carter's egotism and lust of power are admirably depicted — ambition in the rough — tyrants of primitive civilization. But the Canadian woodsmen possess the greatness of the pioneering instincts : —

I know that my judgment of a certain Pharoah was too hasty. The man who wanted bricks made without straw was a great man - a hustler. He was of the kind of Carter. He wanted efficiency. He wanted men not to depend upon others helplessly. He wanted to instil his own great spirit into them, so that they would say of their own accord : ' We possess no means of doing this job; never mind, we can do it all the same.' And he would make money.. . I liked the spirit of the thing; the quiet feeling that things must be done ' right now,' kept on till they are done; that one "has to get a move on," and work quickly. Not if the weather suits or if circumstances are favorable, or if one's calculations are correct, or unless one should be too tired. There was very little "if" or "unless" about Carter or Allen.

Young Mr. Grainger's book is exceedingly interesting to Australians opening up a great country under other physical conditions, but on the same human principles as in the land of the maple and the pine. It is worthy to rank with Steele Rudd's Selection series. It has not Steele Rudd's humor of the guffaw, but it scintillates with wit and exhibits a fine vision of the inner meaning of things. I am not surprised that the English press has spoken highly of the young man's first plunge into literature.
