= Henry Allerdale Grainger =

Australian politician

Henry Allerdale Grainger (7 August 1848 – 17 December 1923), generally known as Allerdale Grainger, nicknamed "Ally", was an Australian investor, accountant, editor and polemicist who briefly held a seat in the South Australian Legislative Council. and represented the South Australian House of Assembly multi-member seat of Wallaroo from 1884 to 1885 and from 1890 to 1901, then served as State Agent in London.

== History ==
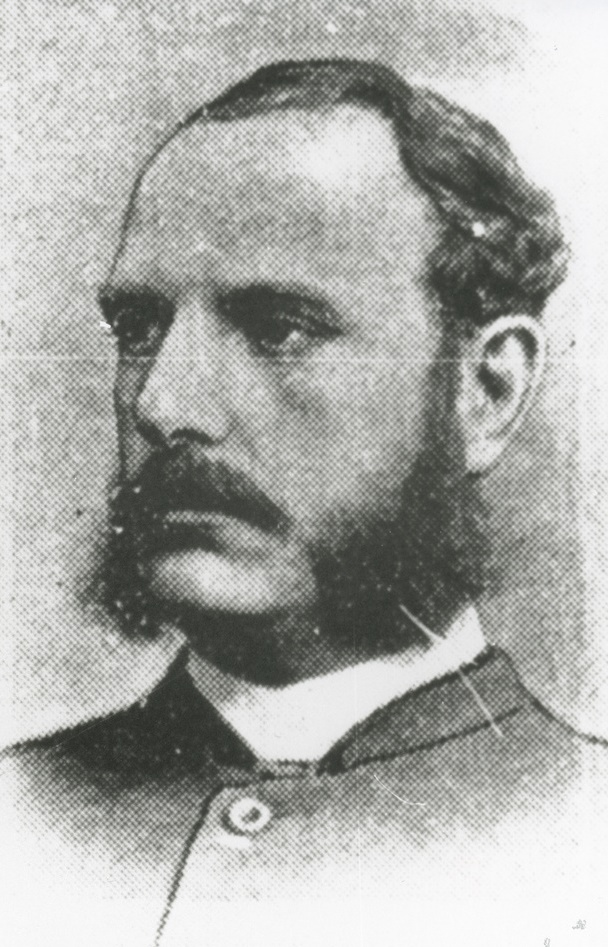
H. Allerdale Grainger (1848–1923)

Allerdale Grainger, whose full name may have been Henry William Allerdale Grainger, was born in England the youngest son of Henry Grainger (1 April 1801 – 20 November 1889) of High Ireby, Cumberland, and nephew of John Grainger (c. 1803–1872). He was educated at Rugby school, and followed his father as a speculator on the Stock Exchange, but with mixed results. He sailed to America, where he had some success as a journalist.

Allerdale sailed to South Australia on the Hesperus, landing at Port Adelaide in September 1876. He soon made himself known through well-written articles in the local newspapers on subjects as diverse as Emigration agents in England and the workers they recruit, Christmas at the North Pole, Artesian wells and Government auctions. He held a public meeting, chaired by W. C. Buik, on the subject of Chinese immigration (he was against it, except to the Northern Territory), at which he signalled his parliamentary ambitions, to a small and rowdy audience who showed the chairman much more respect than the speaker.

The political parties of the day had settled on the free trade model, and there was little to choose between the two newspapers (The Advertiser and The Register). Grainger upset this cozy state of affairs with his outspoken advocacy for protectionism, which he had picked up in America, then in June 1877 founded his own penny weekly newspaper, the Australian Star. The paper was fresh and opinionated, and disrespectful of "establishment" figures and opinions. A regular feature of the paper was an editorial opinion piece "Both Sides of the Wall, by the Man on Top". Australian Star was the first to publish poems by Victor Daley. It was in terms of circulation quite successful, but Grainger was not a man to stick to a task long enough for it to be profitable and some three years later it had new owners and management.

He campaigned strongly for a seat at the April 1881 Legislative Council election, but was unsuccessful. Henry Scott resigned later that year and at the ensuing by-election Grainger stood and was again unsuccessful. The newspapers ascribed his failure o his "rabid protectionism", while Grainger put it down to his youth. Undeterred, Grainger stood for the seat of Wallaroo in the Assembly in 1884, and was elected, with Luke Furner in the other seat. This was not to last however, as he was declared insolvent and on 19 January 1885 resigned. David Bews won the resulting by-election on 16 February. Grainger was not one to retreat into the shadows; he made his views known on every contentious subject confronting the colony. He supported the Jubilee International Exhibition. opposed sacking public servants to balance the Government's budget, He was in May 1886 accused by solicitor Bonnin of being one of those having a large unsecured overdraft with the Commercial Bank of South Australia whose manager Alexander Crooks and accountant Alexander McKenzie Wilson engineered the bank's downfall. Grainger denied he was a creditor, as his overdraft was secured, and was inclined to sued for libel but was dissuaded by his lawyers.

Grainger was in Sydney and Melbourne in 1886, initially in an attempt to gain custody of his son, then remained in Victoria until early 1887, when he once more entered the South Australian political fray. This was a time of economic recession and high unemployment, and Grainger had his own solutions which he was anxious to share. He stood for the seat of West Adelaide in March, but lost to Lawrence Grayson. Undeterred, he continued his campaign of self-advertisement as the worker's friend, and nominated for the seat of Sturt, whose successful candidates were W. F. Stock and J. G. Jenkins.

He suffered a severe illness in 1887 and fears were held for his life, but the "clever erratic" recovered and was soon back in print on topics as diverse as Chinese immigration (again), State finances, the game of Rugby, mining laws, State ownership of land, a State Bank, silting of Torrens Lake, State borrowing,

In the April 1890 elections he stood again for his old electorate, Wallaroo, and was returned along with Bews.

In 1901 Sir John Cockburn's term of office as South Australia's Agent-General in England was about to conclude, and Grainger was appointed as State Agent with much the same role, but with Federation a much reduced diplomatic responsibility. This was sold as a money-saving measure, with a salary of £1,000 rather than £1,500, but was also seen as a convenient way for Richard Butler, the new Treasurer, to be rid of a credible financial critic. In the event, his salary was fixed at £1,200 and the title of the position reverted to "Agent-General" with a fixed term of three years, then extended a further year. While in London Grainger was a member of the Savage Club, to which he introduced his famous (but probably unrelated) namesake Percy Grainger. Allerdale took his sister to official functions where a companion was expected. Grainger returned to Adelaide on the steamer Omrah. His health had suffered during his last year in England, and there was no-one at the wharf to meet him, perhaps as a rebuke for voicing his displeasure at the slow response he received while in London. J. G. Jenkins was his successor as Agent-General.

Grainger lost no time in satisfying his penchant for publication: his thoughts on the State's image overseas, eccentricities and corruption in the British Houses of Parliament A lecture he gave to an appreciative audience which included Thomas Hardy, H. M. Martin and H. Buring on the export of wine could have been made yesterday. He took an illustrated lecture tour on "South Australia before 1850" through major country centres.

In May 1906 Grainger was bruited as a United Labor candidate for the forthcoming Federal elections, then dropped. He stood for the State House of Assembly seat of Alexandra in November that year, but was not one of the four elected.

After returning from London, Grainger lived in North Adelaide. In May 1920 he left Adelaide for England, intending to live in retirement with his son, who retired from his position around the same time, but rather lived with his sister in Leamington Spa. He was in poor health in the last years, and died in December 1923, a few months after his sister.

Grainger was a tall 192 centimetres (6 ft 4 in), strongly built man whose chief weapon was his quick wit, though he was once convicted of hitting a man who struck his dog with a stick.

== Other interests ==
- He was an administrator with the (Australian Rules) Adelaide Football Club.
- He was a founding member of the Adelaide Bowling Club.
- He was on the board of the School of Mines.
- Apart from the short essays mentioned above, Grainger wrote at least one short story, The Montacute Murder, which was serialized in 1887, and identifies him as a writer of no mean ability.

- "The Montacute Murder. Introductory". The Express and Telegraph. Vol. XXIV, no. 7, 034. South Australia. 1 June 1887. p. 6.
- "The Montacute Murder. Chapter I." The Express and Telegraph. Vol. XXIV, no. 7, 035. South Australia. 2 June 1887. p. 4.
- "The Montacute Murder. Chapter I. (cont.)". The Express and Telegraph. Vol. XXIV, no. 7, 036. South Australia. 3 June 1887. p. 4.
- "The Montacute Murder. Chapter II". The Express and Telegraph. Vol. XXIV, no. 7, 037. South Australia. 4 June 1887. p. 4.
- "The Montacute Murder. Chapter III". The Express and Telegraph. Vol. XXIV, no. 7, 038. South Australia. 6 June 1887. p. 4.
- "The Montacute Murder. Chapter IV". The Express and Telegraph. Vol. XXIV, no. 7, 038. South Australia. 6 June 1887. p. 4.

- In 1904 he had his portrait in Agent-General's uniform painted in oils by John Longstaff.
- He was a trustee of the Savings Bank of South Australia from July 1907; on his retirement was succeeded by Thomas Gill.
- He was secretary of the Liquor Trades Defence Union of South Australia, and author of Licensing Act (1908) and Food and Drugs' Act (1908); : An easy reference to. pub. E. A. Leeder, Adelaide (1908)

== Family ==
He married Isabella King ( – ) at Notting Hill, England, on 20 October 1872. They had one son:

- Martin Allerdale Grainger (17 November 1874 — 15 October 1941) received his early education at St Peter's College, Adelaide, followed by Blundell's School in Tiverton and King's College, Cambridge. After serving with the British army, he moved to British Columbia, became a journalist and author of Woodsmen of the West. He later taught mathematics at a girls' school. He married Mabel Florence Halton Higgs on 23 June 1908.

Allerdale and Isabella separated in 1886, and then began a custody battle in which so much mutually contradictory evidence was produced that one person was clearly lying. Martin elected to live with his mother, and they returned to England, living at Bampton Street, Tiverton. The son, who signed his name "M. Allerdale Grainger", appears to have followed his father in his preoccupation with Chinese immigration; the Westminster Gazette published an article on the subject that in tone and content could have been written by his father. He served as a Trooper with Roberts' Horse in South Africa, then as Lieutenant in the Manchester Regiment. He sent letters to his father from South Africa; one was published in the Adelaide papers.

Diplomatic posts
Preceded by John Cockburn	Agent-General for South Australia; 1901–1905	Succeeded by John Jenkins
