= 2nd Iowa Independent Battery Light Artillery =

2nd Iowa Light Artillery Battery
- Active: August 18, 1861 – February 7, 1865
- Disbanded: February 7, 1865
- Country: United States
- Allegiance: Union
- Branch: Artillery
- Size: Battery
- Engagements: American Civil War: Battle of Iuka; Battle of Corinth; Siege of Vicksburg; Battle of Nashville

Commanders
- Captain: Nelson T. Spoor; Joseph R. Reed; John W. Coons
- 1st Lieutenant: John Burk; Daniel P. Walling
- 2nd Lieutenant: C.F. Reed; J.E. Snyder

The 2nd Iowa Light Artillery Battery was a light artillery battery from Iowa that served in the Union Army between August 18, 1861, and February 7, 1865, during the American Civil War.

== Service ==
The 2nd Iowa Light Artillery was mustered into Federal service at Council Bluffs, Iowa for a three-year enlistment on August 18, 1861. The regiment was mustered out of Federal service on August 7, 1865.

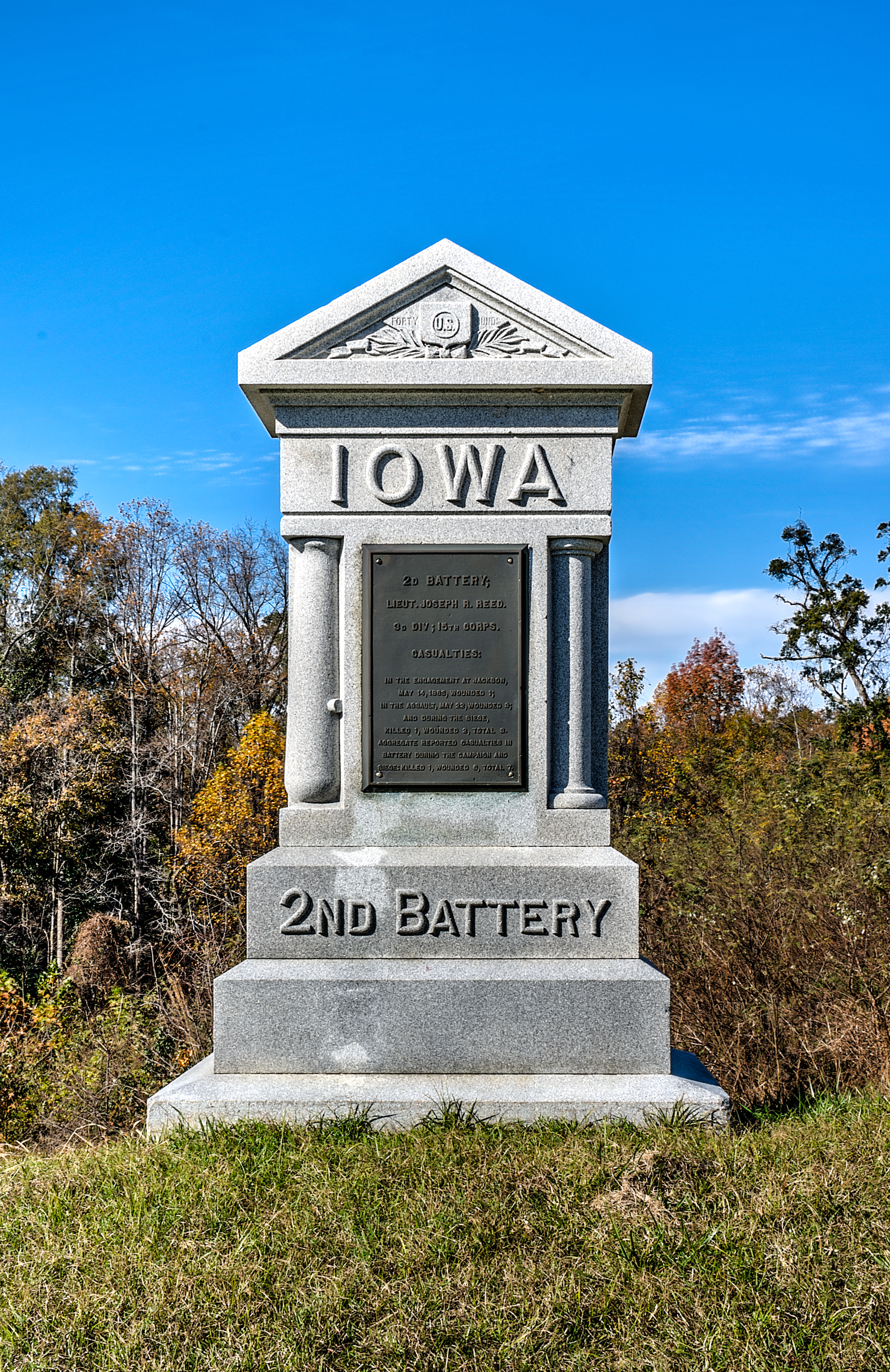
Memorial at Vicksburg National Military Park

== Total strength and casualties ==
A total of 193 men served in the 2nd Iowa Battery at one time or another during its existence. It suffered 3 enlisted men who were killed in action or who died of their wounds and 29 enlisted men who died of disease, for a total of 32 fatalities

== Bibliography ==
- The Civil War Archive
