= Alexander Clark =

African-American businessman and activist

Alexander G. Clark
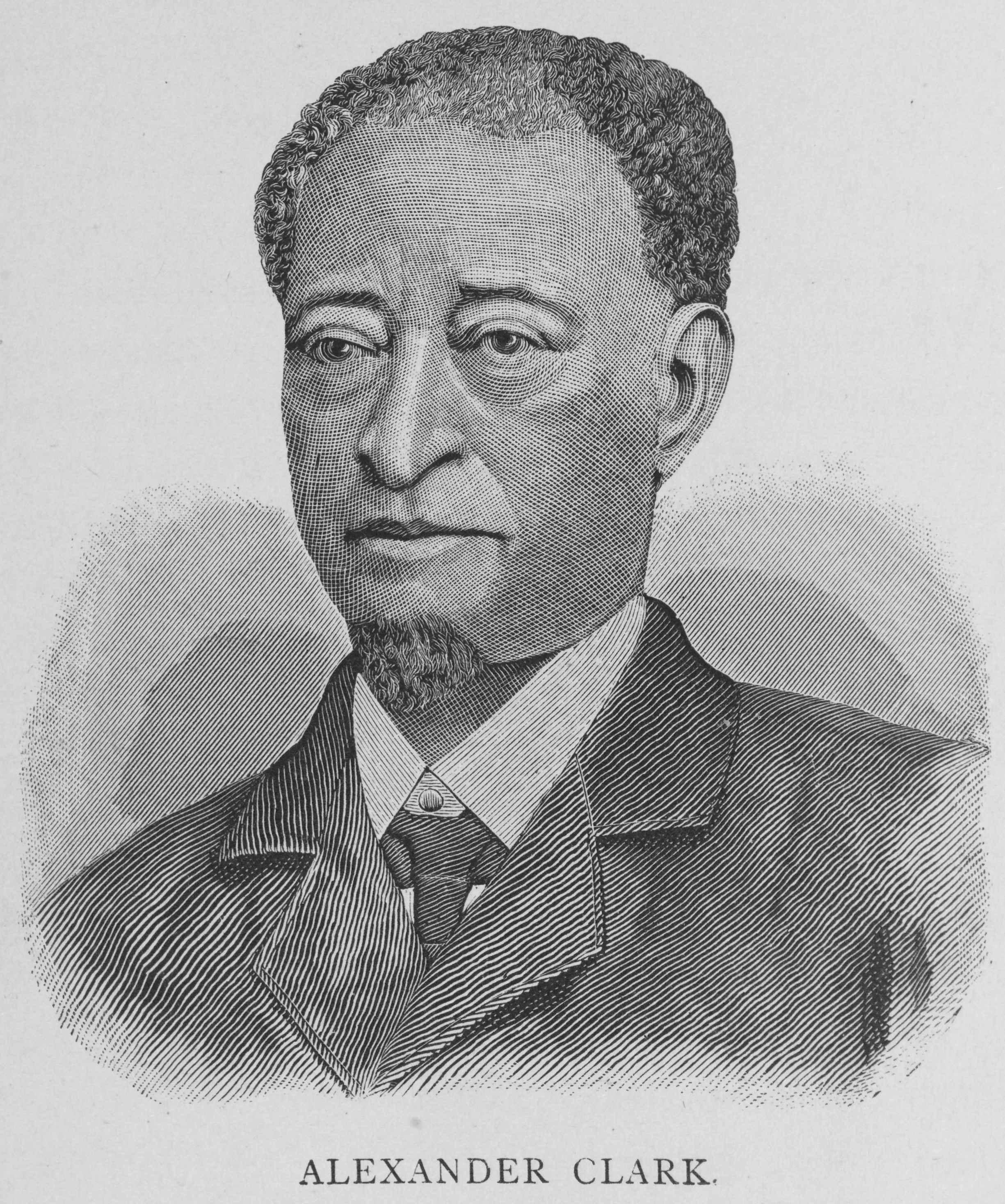
- Born: February 25, 1826; Washington, Pennsylvania, US
- Died: May 31, 1891 (aged 65); Monrovia, Liberia
- Resting place: Muscatine, Iowa
- Occupations: Businessman, activist, orator, diplomat

Alexander G. Clark (February 25, 1826 – May 31, 1891) was an African-American businessman and activist who served as United States Ambassador to Liberia in 1890–1891, where he died in office. In 1867 Clark sued to gain admission for his daughter to attend a local public school in Muscatine, Iowa. The case of Clark v. Board of School Directors achieved a constitutional ruling for integration from the Iowa Supreme Court in 1868, 86 years before the United States Supreme Court decision of Brown v. Board of Education (1954). He was a prominent leader in winning a state constitutional amendment that gained the right for African Americans in Iowa to vote (1868). Active in church, freemasonry, and the Republican Party, he became known for his speaking skills and was nicknamed "the Colored Orator of the West." He earned a law degree and became co-owner and editor of The Conservator in Chicago. His body was returned from Liberia in 1892 and buried in Muscatine, where his house has been preserved.

== Early life and family ==
Alexander G. Clark was born February 25, 1826, in Washington, Pennsylvania to parents who had been freed from slavery. His parents were John Clark and Rebecca (Darnes) Clark. When he was around 13, Clark moved to Cincinnati, Ohio, to live with an uncle and learn the barbering trade. His uncle, William Darnes, also saw to his education in other areas. Two years later the young Clark started working on the river steamboat George Washington.

== Life in Muscatine ==
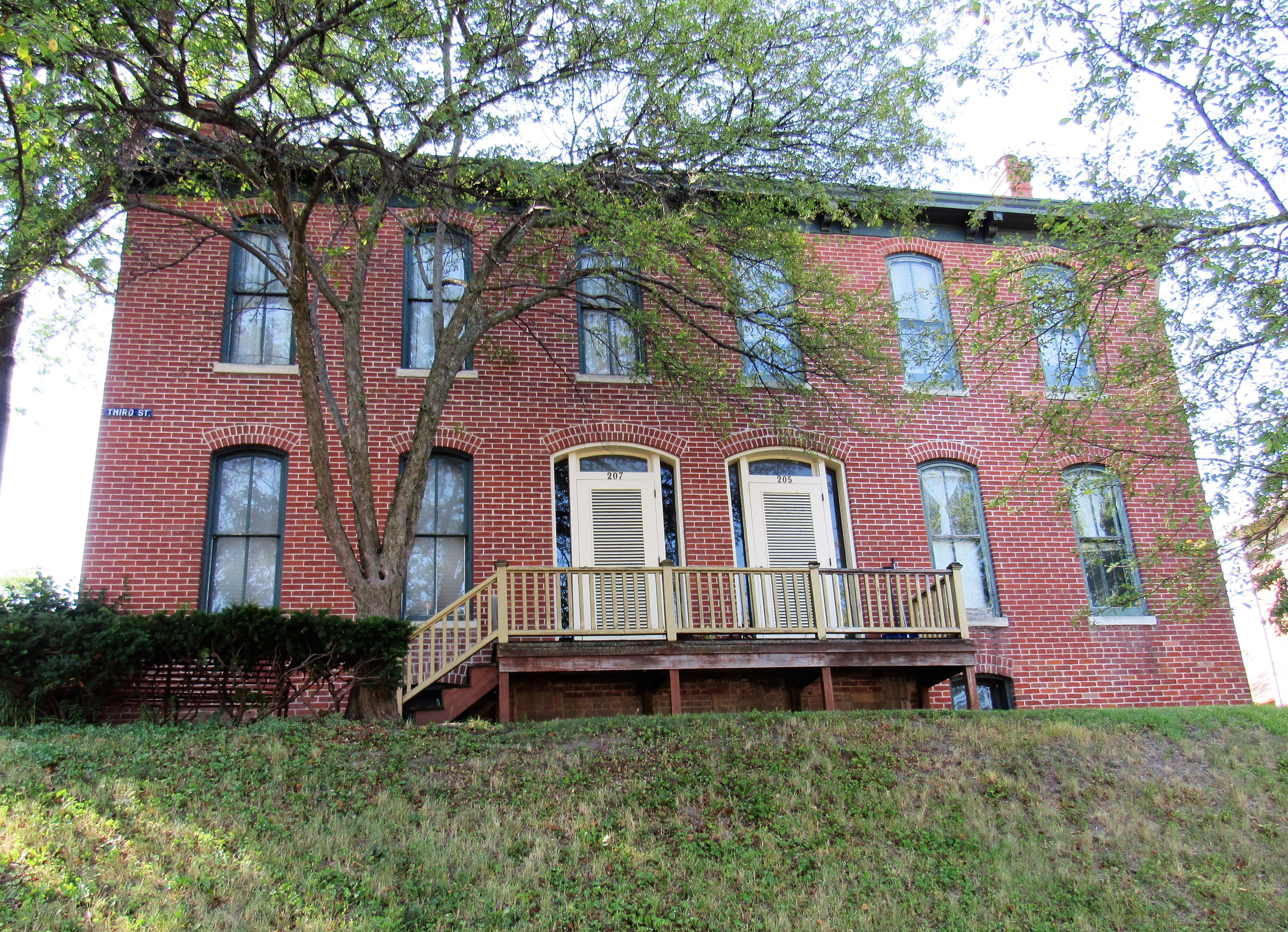
Clark's house in Muscatine

In May 1842 at age 16 Clark settled in Muscatine, Iowa (then known as Bloomington), the Mississippi River town where he made his life. He worked as a barber and became an entrepreneur, acquiring real estate and selling timber as firewood to the steamboats that frequented the Mississippi River. Barbering was a service trade that helped him meet influential whites in town as well as blacks.

During the next two decades, this area along the Mississippi River was a destination for other African Americans. Located 90 miles upriver of the border of the slave state of Missouri, Muscatine attracted the largest black population in the state: 62 in 1850, with hundreds more by 1860. Some blacks settled there after fleeing the South via the river as fugitive slaves; others came from eastern free states. Quakers and other religious groups supported abolitionism.

Having gotten established, Clark married Catherine Griffin of Iowa City on October 9, 1848. She had been freed from slavery in Virginia at age 3. The Clarks had five children, two of whom died in infancy. Their surviving children were Rebecca, Susan, and Alexander G. Clark Jr.

Also in 1848 Clark was among the 34 founding members of the local African Methodist Episcopal Church in Muscatine, helping buy land for their first building, which was completed the next year. The AME church was the first independent black denomination in the United States, founded in Philadelphia, Pennsylvania in the early 19th century.

Clark became acquainted with abolitionist Frederick Douglass and was the Iowa agent for the Douglass newspaper The North Star. He reportedly attended a Douglass-organized convention in Rochester, New York, in 1853. They were still in touch in the late 1880s, and some of their correspondence was published in newspapers.

In 1863, during the American Civil War (1861–1865), Clark helped recruit the "60th Iowa Colored Troops, originally known as the 1st Iowa Infantry, African Descent." Despite being a small minority in the state, by war's end, a total of nearly 1,100 blacks from Iowa and Missouri served in the regiment. Clark enlisted at age 37 and was ranked as sergeant-major, but he could not muster due to a physical defect, perhaps in his left ankle.

Clark pressed for improving civil rights for African Americans in Iowa, as well as related issues on a national level. In 1855 he had signed a petition to the state legislature with more than 30 other African Americans from Muscatine County, seeking a repeal of the law prohibiting the migration of free blacks into the state. The legislature did not change the law, but migration to the area increased after the war and emancipation of slaves. As industry developed in other areas, the center of the black population moved to other cities such as Des Moines. After the Civil War, Clark and African-American veterans pressed the Iowa legislature for the right to vote, gaining that in an 1868 constitutional amendment.

In 1867, Clark sent his daughter, Susan, to a local public school in Muscatine as she wanted to further her education but there was no secondary school for Black children in the town at the time. The school enforced a policy of separate school for Black students, so she was turned away. This happened after he already had tried to send his children to a close by public school after the nearby public school for Black children shut down in 1865, but Susan and her siblings were turned away after two days. He sued the school board in 1868 for the right of his daughter to attend her local school, resulting in the case Clark v. Board of School Directors. The local municipal court ruled in his favor but the school board appealed.

The Iowa State Supreme Court also ruled in the Clarks' favor in March 1868, noting that under the 1857 Iowa Constitution, the board of education is required to "provide for the education of all the youths of the State, through a system of common schools." The court ruled that requiring Black students to attend a separate school and denying them of a quality education violated the law which "expressly gives the same rights to all the youths." Due to Clark's action, Iowa was among the first states to integrate its schools. This case was later cited by the US Supreme Court in its ruling in Brown v. Board of Education (1954). In 2019, the middle school Susan attended was renamed Susan Clark Junior High in recognition of her integrating the school and Iowa public schools as a result.

Clark's son, Alexander G. Clark Jr., was the first African American to earn a law degree from the college in Iowa City, now part of the University of Iowa, graduating in 1879. Clark Sr. also studied there, graduating with a law degree in 1884. They practiced together for a while.

== Politics, publishing, and US ambassador to Liberia ==
After the Civil War, Clark became increasingly politically active in the Republican Party and in Prince Hall Freemasonry, a growing fraternal organization. In 1869, he was a delegate to the Washington, DC Colored National Convention and was among a committee that met with President Ulysses S. Grant. He served as spokesman of the committee. That same year Clark was elected vice-president of the Iowa State Republican convention. In 1872 he was a delegate-at-large to the Republican National Convention which nominated Grant. Because of his abilities as a speaker, Clark became known as the "Colored Orator of the West". In 1873 President Grant offered him an appointment as consul to Aux Cayes, Haiti, but he declined the position as he thought the pay was too low.

Clark moved to Chicago. He had previously invested in The Conservator, a newspaper founded by Ferdinand L. Barnett in Chicago in 1878. In the late 1880s he bought the newspaper, also serving as an editor.

President Benjamin Harrison appointed Clark as U.S. Minister to Liberia on August 16, 1890. This was one of the highest-ranking appointments of an African-American by a U.S. president up to that point. Harrison also appointed Clark's longtime friend Frederick Douglass as U.S. Minister to Haiti. Clark died of fever in office in Monrovia, Liberia on May 31, 1891. His body was returned to Muscatine for burial with honors in Greenwood Cemetery. The grave is marked by a tall memorial tombstone.

== Legacy and honors ==
- The Alexander Clark House in Muscatine has been preserved; it is listed on the National Register of Historic Places. It was purchased and restored as a private residence by D. Kent Sissel, who has worked much of his life to preserve and present Clark's story.
- In 1977 the new high-rise Clark House was dedicated; named in Clark's honor, this was Muscatine's "first high-rise to provide subsidized housing for low-income elderly residents."
- Lost In History: Alexander Clark is a 2012 film documentary about the activist, directed and written by Marc Rosenwasser and produced by Jacob Rosdail; produced and broadcast by Iowa Public Television. It is hosted and narrated by opera star Simon Estes. Available on YouTube.
- The Alexander G. Clark Project operates a website and Facebook page devoted to Clark. It was created by D. Kent Sissel and maintained by Daniel G. Clark (no relation).
- The Alexander G. Clark Foundation seeks to preserve Clark's legacy of pioneering equal-rights causes in Iowa and nationwide. Special attention is devoted to care and future institutionalization of the Alexander Clark House. The foundation created a tax-exempt fund at the Community Foundation of Greater Muscatine.
- In 2018 the City of Muscatine established Alexander Clark Day to be observed "in perpetuity" on Clark's birthday, Feb. 25.
- In 2018 a Muscatine museum presented an exhibit in observance of the 150th anniversary of the 1868 Iowa Supreme Court's decision in favor of Susan Clark.
- In 2019 the Alexander Clark Room was dedicated on the 6th floor of the Merrill Hotel and Conference Center on the Muscatine riverfront. Views from its windows overlook both the Mississippi River and the Clark family's historic downtown neighborhood including their home, the Clark House high-rise, the 1850 building where Susan Clark attended high school, and the 1857 building that was the Congregational Church where Clark friends and supporters were members.

== See also ==
- Alexander Clark House, listed on the National Register of Historic Places.
- Clark v. Board of School Directors
