= William H. M. Pusey =

American politician

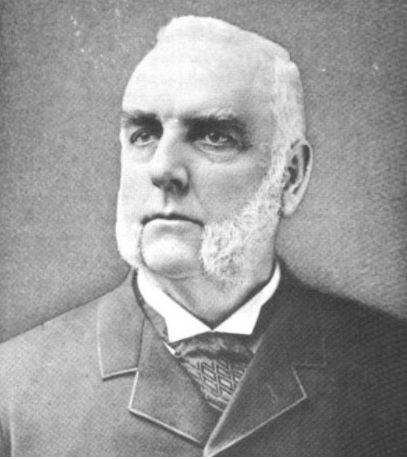

Member of the U.S. House of Representatives from Iowa's 9th district
- In office March 4, 1883 – March 3, 1885
- Preceded by: Cyrus C. Carpenter
- Succeeded by: Joseph Lyman

Personal details
- Born: July 29, 1826 Washington County, Pennsylvania, U.S.
- Died: November 15, 1900 (aged 74) Council Bluffs, Iowa, U.S
- Party: Democratic
- Education: Washington & Jefferson College

William Henry Mills Pusey (July 29, 1826 – November 15, 1900), an American banker, was a one-term Democratic U.S. Representative from Iowa's 9th congressional district in southwestern Iowa from 1883 to 1885.

Born in Washington County, Pennsylvania, Pusey attended the Washington and Jefferson College, Pennsylvania, and was graduated in 1847. He studied law and was admitted to the bar but did not engage in extensive practice. Moving to Iowa, he entered into the banking business in Council Bluffs in 1856. He served as member of the Iowa Senate from 1858 to 1862, representing a 22-county district in sparsely populated western Iowa.

In 1882, Pusey became the first Democrat elected to Congress from southwestern Iowa since the outbreak of the Civil War, defeating Republican nominee (and future Congressman) Albert R. Anderson. While serving in the Forty-eighth Congress, he ran for re-election in 1884. He retained the Democratic nomination but was defeated by Republican Joseph Lyman. In all, he served in Congress from March 4, 1883, to March 3, 1885.

Returning to Iowa, he resumed banking activities. He died in Council Bluffs, Iowa, on November 15, 1900. He was interred in Walnut Hill Cemetery. Pusey's younger brother Nathan Marsh Pusey was an Iowa state senator from 1896 to 1900.

U.S. House of Representatives
Preceded by Cyrus C. Carpenter	Member of the U.S. House of Representatives from Iowa's 9th congressional district 1883–1885	Succeeded by Joseph Lyman
