= Senator Granger =

Senator Granger may refer to:

- Flavel K. Granger (1832–1905), Illinois State Senate
- Gideon Granger (1767–1822), New York State Senate
- Miles T. Granger (1817–1895), Connecticut State Senate
