= Lucien Lester Ainsworth =

American politician (1831–1902)

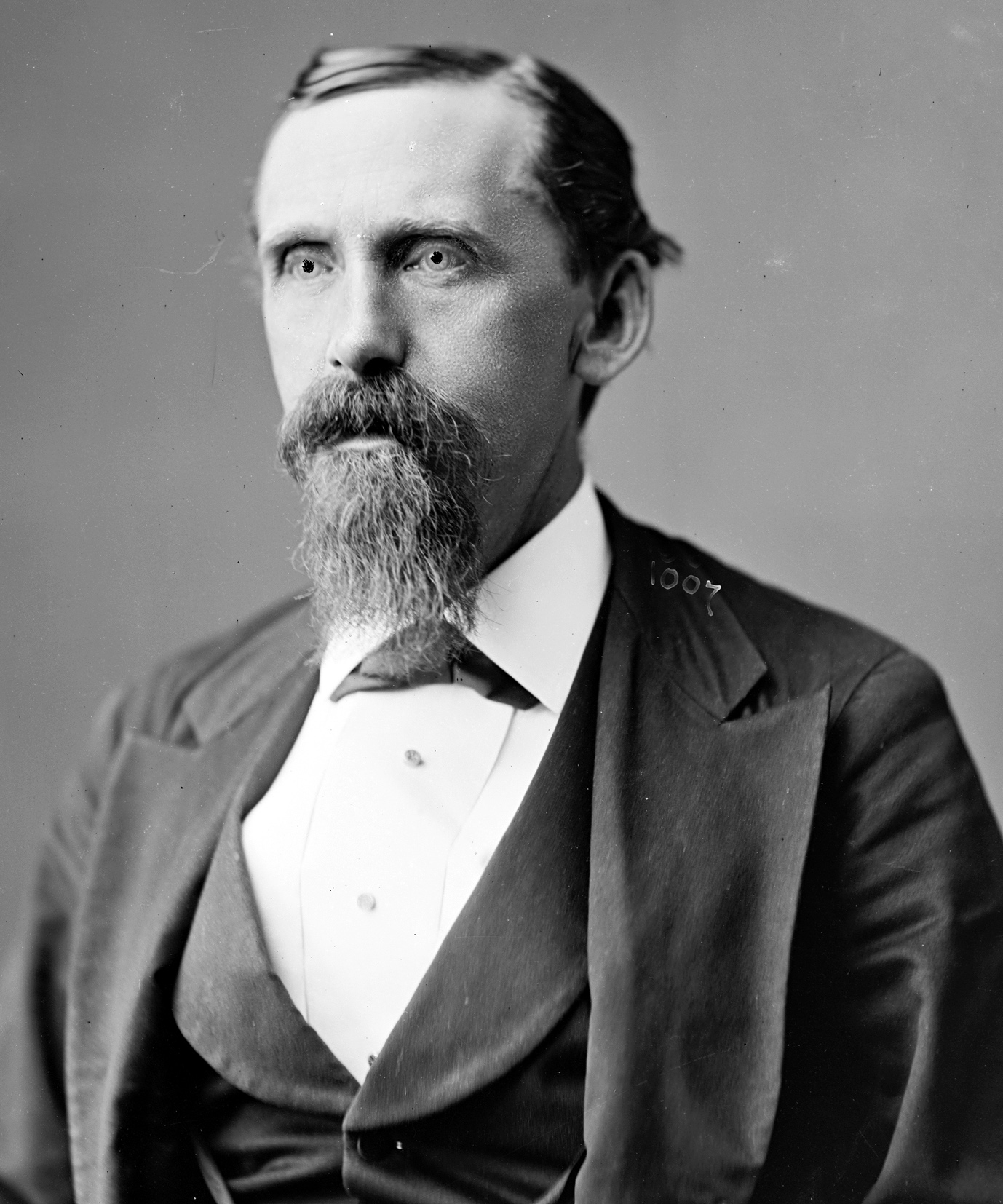

Member of the U.S. House of Representatives from Iowa's 3rd district
- In office March 4, 1875 – March 3, 1877
- Preceded by: William G. Donnan
- Succeeded by: Theodore Weld Burdick

Personal details
- Born: June 21, 1831 New Woodstock, New York, U.S.
- Died: April 19, 1902 (aged 70) West Union, Iowa, U.S.
- Party: Democratic
- Spouse: Margaret Elizabeth McCool

Military service
- Branch/service: Union Army
- Rank: Captain
- Unit: Company C, 6th Iowa Cavalry Regiment
- Battles/wars: American Civil War

Lucien Lester Ainsworth (June 21, 1831 – April 19, 1902) was a one-term Democratic U.S. Representative from Iowa's 3rd congressional district in northeastern Iowa.

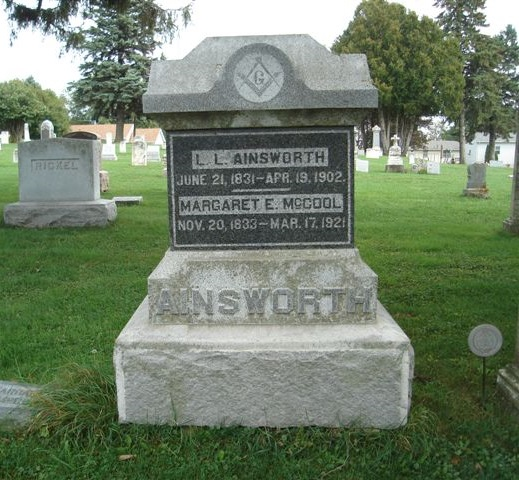
1902 and 1921 - Headstone - L L Ainsworth and Margaret E McCool - West Union Cemetery, West Union, Fayette, Iowa, United States

== Family life ==
Lucien Lester Ainsworth was born on June 21, 1831, in New Woodstock, New York, the eldest child of Parmenas Ainsworth and Keziah Webber. His parents had 3 additional children, Lucretia L (1834), Walter C (1839), and Harriet C (1843). Their mother Keziah died in 1847.

Lucien's father was remarried to Miss Amanda Carpenter on November 2, 1848, in Cazenovia, Madison, New York. Parmenas and Amanda had one child, Ella Kezia Ainsworth born November 15, 1850.

The Ainsworth family ancestors were of English descent. Lucien's Great Grandfather, Nathan Ainsworth (1740–1776) served in the Revolutionary war and "died as a prisoner on an English ship, a martyr to the colonial cause."

On December 8, 1859, Lucien Lester Ainsworth married Margaret Elizabeth McCool (1833–1921), daughter of Joseph McCool and Eleanor Nevius Lucien and Margaret had 5 children, 4 which survived to adulthood.

James Walter (1861)

Lucretia Eleanor "Kittie" (1863)

Charles Gray "Little Charlie" (1866–68)

Porter Lester "Toke" (1868)

Willard Joseph (1870)

Fred Lee (1873)

== Education, military, and employment ==
Young Ainsworth attended the public schools, and the Oneida Conference Seminary, in Cazenovia, New York. "At intervals during his course at the seminary he taught school and was said to be a very popular teacher and educator." In 1854 at age 23, after studying law, he was admitted to the bar in Madison County, New York. That same year he moved to Belvidere, Illinois, and began practicing law.

Just a year later, in 1855, Ainsworth moved to Iowa and continued the practice of law in West Union, where he would remain until his death in 1902.

During the Civil War in 1862, Ainsworth joined the Union Army as captain of Company C, 6th Regiment Iowa Volunteer Cavalry, and served three years in areas of conflict with Native American tribes in the northern Great Plains. He and his company participated in the Battle of Whitestone Hill in Dakota Territory. After leaving the Army, he returned to West Union and resumed the practice of law.

In 1885 Ainsworth continued his law practice. "We find the following local item telegraphed to the Cedar Rapids Republican from Fayette, March 6, 1885. The saloon of Simon Nefzger, at Lima, in this county, was raided night before last and a small quantity of whisky found yesterday morning. Nefzger and his clerk were both arrested for selling and the trial fixed for today. They came by their attorney, L. L. AINSWORTH, of West Union, proposing to quit the business totally and forever and pay all costs and expenses, including attorney for prosecution. Being satisfied that the proposition was made in good faith and would be adhered to, the prosecution did not appear. The costs were promptly paid and there is one less saloon in Iowa. It does prohibit."

In 1890 Ainsworth was mentioned again. "A grave-stone law suit was in progress here last week between J. O. VanSyckel and some parties Strawberry Pointward, which lasted a couple of days. L.L. Ainsworth chopped up law for VanSyckel, and attorney Blair, of Manchester, assisted the defense.

== Political career ==
In the fall of 1856, Ainsworth began his political career by running for the office of Fayette County Attorney as a Democrat. "The county was overwhelmingly Republican, and he was defeated as a matter of course."

LL Ainsworth served as member of the Iowa Senate from 1860 to 1862, representing Bremer and Fayette Counties.

He served as member of the Iowa House of Representatives from 1871 to 1873.

In 1874, Ainsworth ran as a Democrat to represent Iowa's 3rd congressional district in the U.S. House. Becoming the first Iowa Democrat elected to Congress since 1854, he served in the Forty-fourth Congress. He declined to accept a renomination in 1876. He served from March 4, 1875, to March 3, 1877.

== Death ==
He died in West Union, Fayette County, Iowa on April 19, 1902. He is buried in the West Union Cemetery, lot 155 along with his Wife Margaret E. McCool Ainsworth.

U.S. House of Representatives
Preceded by William G. Donnan	Member of the U.S. House of Representatives from Iowa's 3rd congressional district 1875–1877	Succeeded by Theodore W. Burdick
