= Franz Grainer =

Bavarian photographer (1871–1948)

Franz Grainer (born 28 September 1871 in Bad Reichenhall, died 1948 in Munich) was a Bavarian photographer.

== Career ==
Grainer created numerous portraits of the children of the last crown prince of Bavaria, Rupprecht, especially the firstborn Luitpold and the son Albrecht, who was the only one to reach adulthood. In 1919, he was one of the founding members of the Gesellschaft Deutscher Lichtbildner (GDL), the predecessor of the German Academy of Photographs, whose chairmanship he later took over and still held in the power takeover of the National Socialists.

In addition to portrait photographs, more and more nude studies emerged in the 1920s. Works by Grainer are held at the Museum Folkwang in Essen and the Fotomuseum in the Munich Stadtmuseum.

== Works ==
- From the wild. Thierstudien from the high Alps in snapshots by Franz Grainer bayer. Hofphotograph, Berlin 1898
- The modern female portrait, in: Das Deutsche Lichtbild. Year 1927, Berlin 1927

== Portrait gallery ==
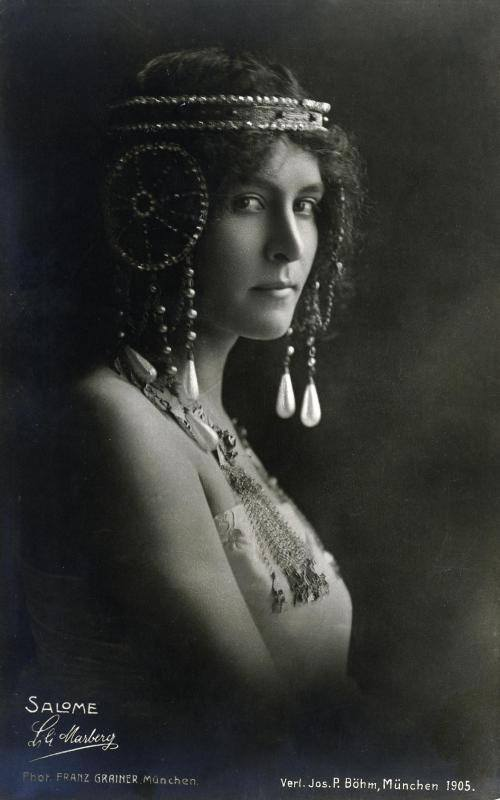
Lili Marberg as Salome, c. 1905

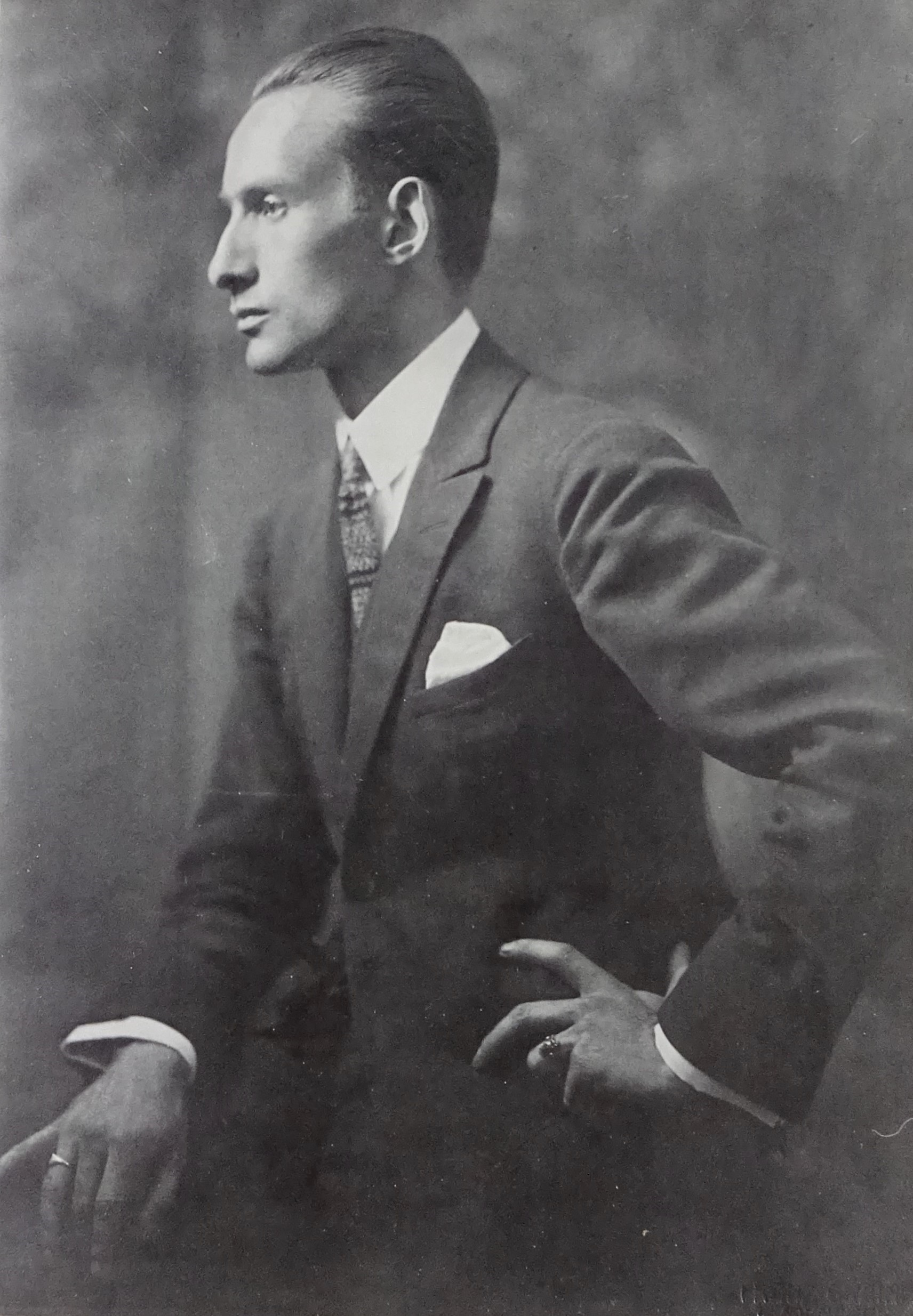
Christian Schad, 1912

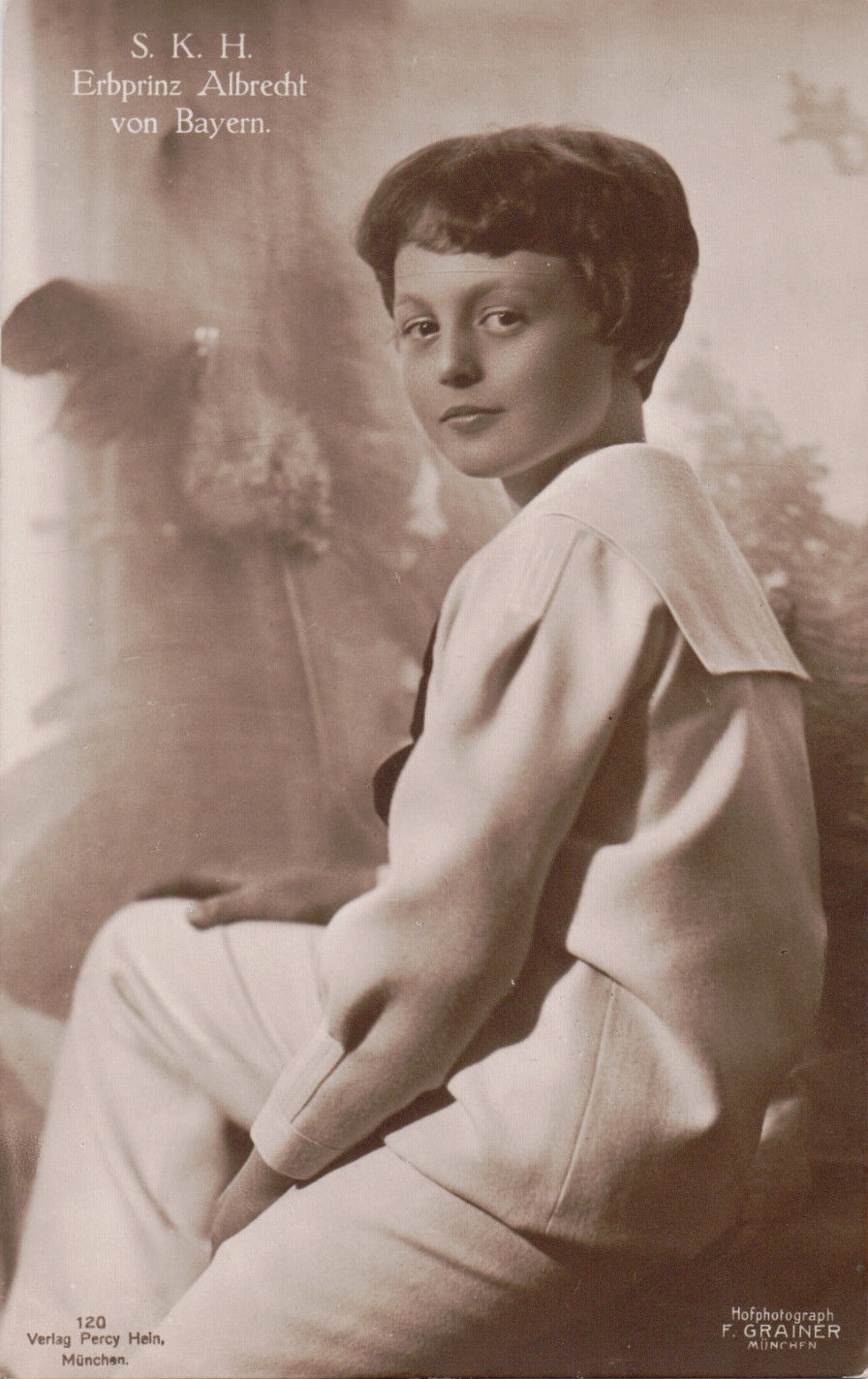
Albrecht, Duke of Bavaria c. 1915

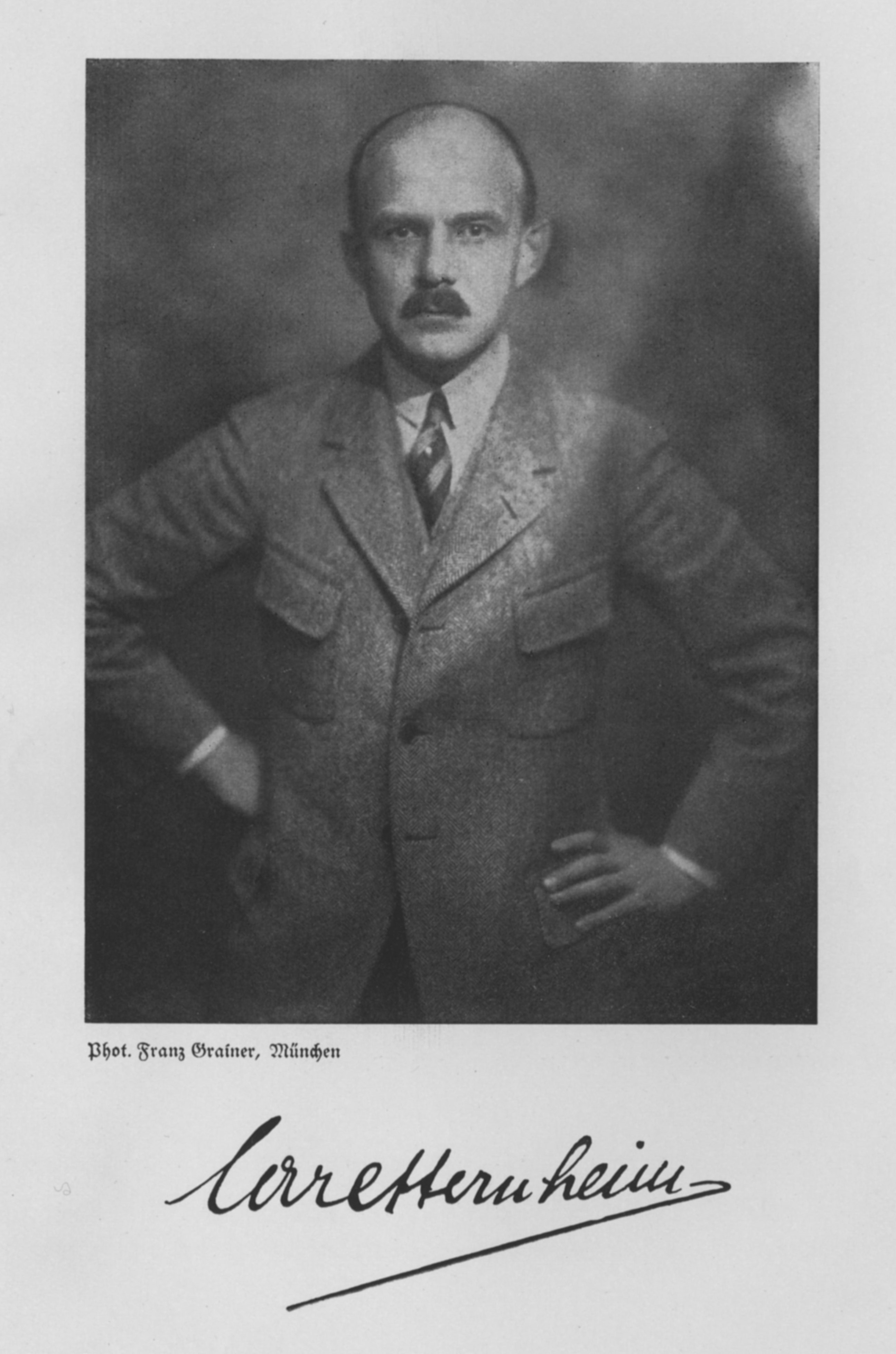
Carl Sternheim, c. 1921

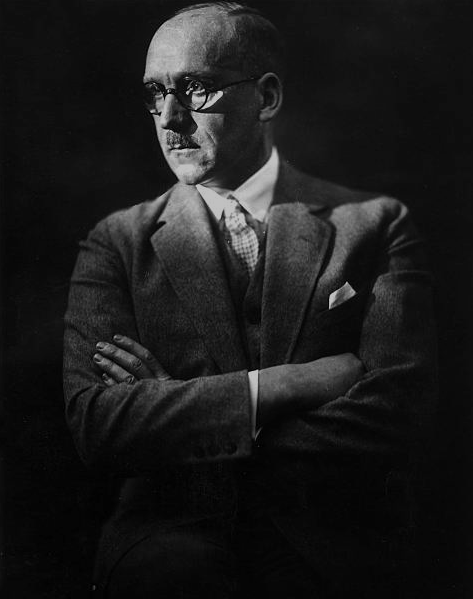
Ferdinand Sauerbruch, 1927
