= James Isham Gilbert =

American general

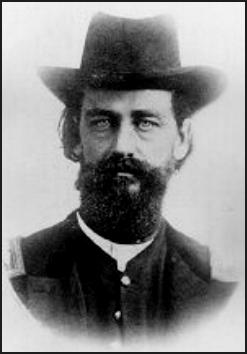
- James I. Gilbert
- Born: July 16, 1823; Louisville, Kentucky, U.S.
- Died: February 9, 1884 (aged 60); Topeka, Kansas, U.S.
- Burial place: Aspen Grove Cemetery; Burlington, Iowa, U.S.
- Military career
- Allegiance: United States; Union
- Branch: United States Army; Union Army
- Service years: 1862–1865
- Rank: Brigadier General; Bvt. Major General
- Commands: 27th Iowa Infantry Regiment; 2nd Bde, 2nd Div, XVI Corps
- Conflicts: American Civil War; Battle of Bayou Fourche; Battle of Meridian; Battle of Fort DeRussy; Battle of Pleasant Hill; Battle of Old River Lake; Battle of Tupelo; Battle of Nashville; Battle of Fort Blakeley
- Other work: lumberman, businessman, miner

James Isham Gilbert (1823–1884) was a Union general during the American Civil War. He served with distinction in the Western theaters of the war as a regimental and brigade commander.

== Biography ==
=== Early life ===
James Gilbert was born in Louisville, Kentucky, on July 16, 1823. He moved to Illinois and then to Wisconsin where he worked as a lumberman, Indian trader and liveryman. He finally settled in Iowa in 1851 where he helped found the town of Lansing.

=== Little Rock & Meridian ===
Gilbert joined the volunteer army later than many of his contemporaries, enlisting in October 1862. Nevertheless, he was appointed colonel of the 27th Iowa Volunteer Infantry Regiment on October 3, 1862. Gilbert's regiment participated in Frederick Steele's Little Rock Expedition but was not involved in any fighting. He was posted to garrison duty in Arkansas and then transferred to Mississippi where his regiment was attached to Andrew J. Smith's division in the XVI Corps during the Meridian expedition.

=== Red River & Tupelo ===
Gilbert and a detachment of the XVI Corps (known as the Right Wing-XVI Corps commanded by Smith) were transferred to the Department of the Gulf under Nathaniel P. Banks for the Red River Campaign. Gilbert won the commendation of his brigade commander, Colonel William T. Shaw, for his performance at the battles of Fort DeRussy and Pleasant Hill. At Pleasant Hill, Gilbert was wounded in the right hand.

In June, 1864 Gilbert assumed command of the 2nd Brigade, 3rd Division, XVI Corps and led it at the battle of Tupelo. He briefly relinquished brigade command in late September but returned to command to take part in A.J. Smith's pursuit of Sterling Price through Missouri.

=== Nashville & Mobile ===
On December 5, 1864, Gilbert was transferred to command of the 2nd Brigade, 2nd Division in Smith's detachment of the Army of the Tennessee (formerly XVI Corps) at the battle of Nashville. There, Gilbert's brigade took part in the Union assault on Shy's Hill the second day of the battle. On February 9, 1865, Gilbert was promoted to brigadier general of U.S. volunteers. Smith's corps was officially re-designated XVI Corps and transferred to Edward Canby's Army of West Mississippi outside Mobile, Alabama. Gilbert continued in command of his brigade and took part in the battle of Fort Blakeley. For his service in the Mobile campaign he was brevetted to Major General of U.S. volunteers backdated to March 26, 1865. Gilbert was mustered out of volunteers on August 24, 1865.

=== Later life ===
After the war Gilbert returned to Iowa and continued his career as a lumberman. For a time he went to Colorado as a miner then moved to Kansas to become president of the Topeka Coal Economizing Company.

General Gilbert died on February 9, 1884, in Topeka, Kansas. He is buried at Aspen Grove Cemetery in Burlington, Iowa.
