= Charles Grainger (cricketer) =

English cricketer and barrister

Personal information
- Full name: Charles Edward Grainger
- Born: 22 November 1858; South Kensington, Middlesex, England
- Died: 19 September 1934 (aged 75); Kensington, London, England
- Batting: Right-handed

Domestic team information
- Years: Team
- 1879: Cambridge University

Career statistics
Competition	First-class
Matches	1
Runs scored	2
Batting average	2.00
100s/50s	–/–
Top score	2*
Catches/stumpings	2/–
- Source: Cricinfo, 26 January 2022

Charles Edward Grainger (22 November 1858 – 19 September 1934) was an English first-class cricketer and barrister.

The son of Charles Thornton Grainger, he was born at South Kensington in November 1858. He was educated at Marlborough College, where he played for the college cricket team in 1876 and 1877. From Marlborough he matriculated to Trinity College, Cambridge. While studying at Cambridge, he made a single appearance in first-class cricket for Cambridge University Cricket Club against Surrey at The Oval in 1879. Batting at number eleven in the Cambridge first innings, he was dismissed without scoring by George Strachan. With Cambridge requiring 3 runs to win the match in their second innings, Grainger was promoted to open the batting alongside Philip Morton, scoring 2 of the 3 runs required for victory.

After graduating from Cambridge, Grainger who was a student of Lincoln's Inn, was called to the bar to practice as a barrister in November 1881. Alongside his legal practice, Grainger was also a wine merchant. He died at Kensington in September 1934.
