= The Telegraph (Adelaide) =

Former newspaper in Adelaide, South Australia

The Telegraph was a newspaper in Adelaide, South Australia, founded in 1862, and merged with The Express to become The Express and Telegraph, published from 1867 to 1922.

== History ==
=== The Adelaide Telegraph ===
The Adelaide Telegraph was founded and edited by Frederick Sinnett (c. 1836 – 23 November 1866) and first published by David Gall on 15 August 1862 as an evening daily, independent of the two morning papers The Advertiser and The Register. The Advertiser, which was first published in 1858, retaliated in 1863 by founding its own afternoon newspaper, The Express, as a competitor to The Telegraph. Ebenezer Ward served as sub-editor 1863 to 1864, when he joined Finniss's Northern Territory expedition as clerk-in-charge, then returned to the Telegraph the following year after being sacked by Finniss for insubordination. Sinnett left for Melbourne in late 1865, and Ward succeeded him as both editor (briefly) and parliamentary shorthand writer until 1868.

=== The Daily Telegraph ===
Around 1864 or 1865 The Adelaide Telegraph was renamed the Daily Telegraph, introduced a morning edition, and founded the short-lived weekend Weekly Mail.

=== The Express and Telegraph ===
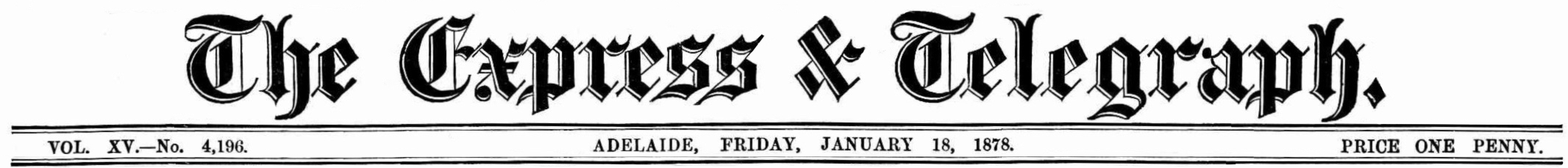

In December 1865 the manager Henry Edlin called in all debts and advertised the business for sale, and was purchased by a consortium led by John Baker. A year later the whole of the "machinery, plant and goodwill" was purchased at auction by the publishers of the Advertiser, Chronicle, and Express. The paper is remembered for publishing some of the earliest writings of "Pasquin" (E. R. Mitford), before he founded his own self-titled weekly in 1867. The Daily Telegraph was then incorporated into The Express as The Express and Telegraph, which title persisted until 1922, when it reverted to simply The Express (1922–1923).
