= Charles T. Granger =

Iowa Supreme Court justice

Justice of the Iowa Supreme Court
- In office January 1, 1889 – December 31, 1900
- Preceded by: William H. Seevers
- Succeeded by: Emlin McClain

Iowa District Court Judge for the 13th district
- In office January 1, 1887 – December 31, 1888 Serving with L. O. Hatch
- Preceded by: Position established
- Succeeded by: L. E. Fellows

Personal details
- Born: October 9, 1835 Monroe County, New York, U.S.
- Died: October 26, 1915 (aged 80) Long Beach, California, U.S.
- Resting place: Oakland Cemetery, Waukon, Iowa
- Party: Republican
- Spouse: Anna Maxwell
- Children: 2: Ula A. Granger; Rollo S. Granger
- Relatives: Jedediah W. Granger (first cousin); Gordon Granger (second cousin)
- Profession: lawyer

Military service
- Allegiance: United States
- Branch/service: United States Volunteers; Union Army
- Years of service: 1862–1865
- Rank: Captain, USV
- Unit: 27th Reg. Iowa Vol. Infantry
- Battles/wars: American Civil War: Red River campaign; Franklin–Nashville campaign

Charles Trumbull Granger (October 9, 1835 – October 26, 1915) was an American lawyer and pioneer settler of Allamakee County, Iowa. He was a justice of the Iowa Supreme Court, serving from 1889 through 1900. He previously served on lower courts in Iowa, serving a total of 28 years in various judicial offices.

== Biography ==
Charles T. Granger was born in Monroe County, New York, in October 1835. At age 2, he moved with his family to Huron County, Ohio. He was raised there, but after the death of his mother in 1845, he fell mostly under the care of his older sister and her husband. He was poorly treated in their home and left Ohio at age 13, going to live with his father in Illinois, who had remarried. After being only minimally educated in Ohio, he began studying while working on his father's farm. In 1855, he entered an academy in Waukegan, Illinois, and continued to advance his own education by reading law texts borrowed from nearby lawyers.

In 1860, he moved to Allamakee County, Iowa, and read law at the office of Hatch & Wilbur. Later that year he was admitted to the bar. Before starting his career, he went to Mitchell County, Iowa, to teach school, and was elected county superintendent of schools. Less than a year later, however, he resigned his office in order to enroll in the Union Army. He was commissioned captain of Company K, 27th Iowa Infantry Regiment, and served through the rest of the war commanding his company.

After the war, he returned briefly to Mitchell County, but before long returned to Allamakee County to form a law practice in partnership with his former mentor, L. O. Hatch.

Three years later, he was appointed district attorney to fill a vacancy. He was subsequently elected to a four-year term in that office in 1870, but before that term ended, he was elected Iowa circuit court judge. During that time, in 1874, he was the Republican nominee for United States House of Representatives in Iowa's 3rd congressional district, but was defeated by Lucien Lester Ainsworth.

Granger ultimately served as a circuit judge until the Iowa circuit courts were abolished in 1886. He then was elected Iowa district court judge for the 13th district alongside his former law partner, L. O. Hatch.

Just two years later, he was elected to a six-year term on the Iowa Supreme Court. He was re-elected in 1894. He retired at the end of his second term.

He continued to make Waukon his primary home, but spent a great deal of time in California for his health. He died of pneumonia at Long Beach, California, in October 1915.

== Personal life and family ==
Charles Granger was the youngest son of Trumbull Granger and his first wife Sally (née Dibble). Granger's first cousin Jedediah W. Granger was also an officer in the 27th Wisconsin Infantry. Union Army general Gordon Granger was a second cousin. The Grangers were descendants of Launcelot Granger, who was kidnapped as a child from England and brought to the Massachusetts Bay Colony as an indentured servant in the 1640s.

== Elections ==
=== Iowa Supreme Court (1888, 1894) ===
Iowa Supreme Court Election, 1888
Party	Candidate	Votes	%	±%
General Election, November 6, 1888
Republican	Charles T. Granger	210,098	52.27%	
Democratic	P. Henry Smyth	182,894	45.50%	
Independent	M. H. Jones	8,943	2.22%	
Plurality		27,204	6.77%	
Total votes		401,935	100.0%	

Iowa Supreme Court Election, 1894
Party	Candidate	Votes	%	±%
General Election, November 6, 1894
Republican	Charles T. Granger (incumbent)	228,762	54.55%	+2.28%
Democratic	John Cliggitt	183,148	43.68%	−1.83%
Populist	Jacob W. Rogers	7,181	1.71%	
	Scattering	237	0.06%	
Plurality		45,614	10.88%	+4.11%
Total votes		401,935	100.0%	+4.33%

Legal offices
New court established	Iowa District Court Judge for the 13th district January 1, 1887 – December 31, 1888; Served alongside: L. O. Hatch	Succeeded by L. E. Fellows
Preceded by William H. Seevers	Justice of the Iowa Supreme Court; January 1, 1889 – December 31, 1900	Succeeded by Emlin McClain
