= Larry E. Greiner =

American economist

- Born: December 6, 1933
- Died: March 1, 2013 (aged 79)
- Known for: Greiner's growth model

Larry Eugene Greiner (December 6, 1933 – March 1, 2013) was an American economist who was Professor of Management and Organizations at University of Southern California USC Marshall School of Business.

== Academic background ==
Greiner received a bachelor's degree from the University of Kansas. In 1958, Greiner entered Harvard Business School, where he received an MBA followed by a DBA in 1966.

== Greiner's growth model ==
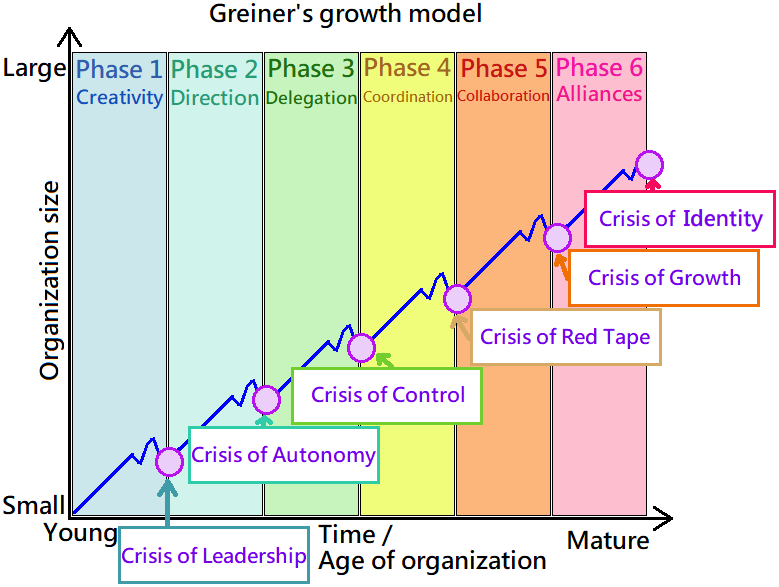
Greiner's growth model

In 1972, Greiner proposed the Greiner's growth model, using five key concepts: the age of the organization, the size of the organization, the stage of evolution, the stage of revolution and the growth rate of the industry. Divide it into six phases (Only five phases when proposed in 1972, and a sixth phases was added in 1998), and proposed two key concepts: Evolution and Revolution. This directly illuminates how organizations overcome growth crises, while their respective resolution strategies form the basis for re-emerging crises.

- Phase 1─Creativity: Everyone knows everything and there is a lot of discussion and mutual information. But as the organization gradually grows, the information received by the participants begins to be overloaded, and their growth will encounter a crisis of leadership.
- Phase 2─Direction: As organizations grow, decision makers are overloaded with work due to the necessity of control and the lack of self-control of employees, and their growth will encounter a crisis of autonomy.
- Phase 3─Delegation: Organizational sub-areas or tasks are handed (missions, responsibilities and permissions) over and performed by others, and their growth will encounter a crisis of control.
- Phase 4─Coordination: Projects and tasks of various departments are coordinated with each other. However, this coordination by vote may lead to the organization becoming bureaucratic, and their growth will encounter a crisis of red tape.
- Phase 5─Collaboration: Reduced friction costs for organizations, and their growth will encounter a crisis of growth.
- Phase 6─Alliances: Organizations their growth will encounter a crisis of identity. Which was added the phase in 1998.

== Death ==
Greiner died in Los Angeles, California on March 1, 2013, at the age of 79.
