= Martin Allerdale Grainger =

Canadian journalist, forester and author

Martin Allerdale Grainger (17 November 1874 – 15 October 1941) was a Canadian journalist, forester and author. In literary circles, he is best known for his 1908 novel Woodsmen of the West, a realist work about the logging industry. He was an influential figure in developing forestry in British Columbia, as primary author of the report that led to the Forestry Act of 1912, and as chief forester, a position he held from 1917 until 1920.

== Biography ==
Grainger was born in London, England, the only child of (Henry) Allerdale Grainger (7 August 1848 – 17 December 1923) and his wife Isabella, née King, who married at Notting Hill on 20 October 1872. In 1876 they emigrated to Adelaide, South Australia, where Allerdale would found a newspaper and serve as a member of Parliament. Allerdale and Isabella separated in 1886 and she and Martin returned to England.

As a child in Adelaide he was educated at St Peter's College and after returning to England attended Blundell's School in Tiverton and King's College at the University of Cambridge, where he excelled in mathematics. On graduation from Cambridge in 1896, he went to the Klondike and later served as a trooper with Roberts's Horse in the Boer War in 1899 – 1902. Grainger then travelled to northern British Columbia where he worked at placer mining, logging and journalism. In 1908, while in England, he wrote Woodsmen of the West, a novel based on his experiences as a logger. In 1909, he returned to British Columbia and served as secretary to the Royal Commission on Forestry. In this capacity, he wrote most of the report on which the Forestry Act (1912) was based, leading to the formation of the British Columbia Forestry Service. He served as Deputy Chief Forester and, from 1917 to 1920, as Chief Forester of British Columbia. From 1920, he ran a logging company.

He died in Vancouver in 1941.

== Woodsmen of the West ==
Grainger's only novel, Woodsmen of the West (1908), was written for purely practical reasons. He and his new wife, Mabel Higgs of Victoria, British Columbia, wanted to return to Canada to live. Grainger hoped that the book would fund their return. It succeeded. It is a realistic and original account of the life of loggers on Canada's West Coast at the turn of the century. In writing it, Grainger drew on his experience in the coastal forests.

His only other book is Riding the Skyline, a posthumous collection of writings.

== Recognition ==
- His portrait, in oils by Sir John Longstaff, is held by the Art Gallery of South Australia.

== Bibliography ==
- Woodsmen of the West (1908)
- Riding the Skyline (1994)
