= Charles Henry Granger =

American painter

Charlie Granger
- Born: Charles Henry Granger; June 13, 1812; Saco, Massachusetts, United States
- Died: September 8, 1893 (aged 81); Saco, Maine, United States
- Occupations: Musician, painter, poet, sculptor

Charles Henry Granger (June 13, 1812 – September 8, 1893) was an American itinerant painter who at various times was also a poet, composer, musician, music teacher, sculptor and draftsman.

== Life ==
Granger studied for two-and-a-half years at West Point before returning to Saco where he started teaching himself piano, drawing, and painting. In 1839, he married Mary Eaton (1811–1888) of Kennebunkport, a town near Saco. Only a few months later, Granger left his bride to embark on a three-year trip to seek further instruction in painting and to establish contact with artists and clients. After brief stopovers in Portsmouth, New Hampshire, Newburyport and Boston, Massachusetts, and New York City, Granger paid more extended visits to Philadelphia, Baltimore, Hagerstown, Maryland, and Washington. His travels are well documented in his diaries and letters.

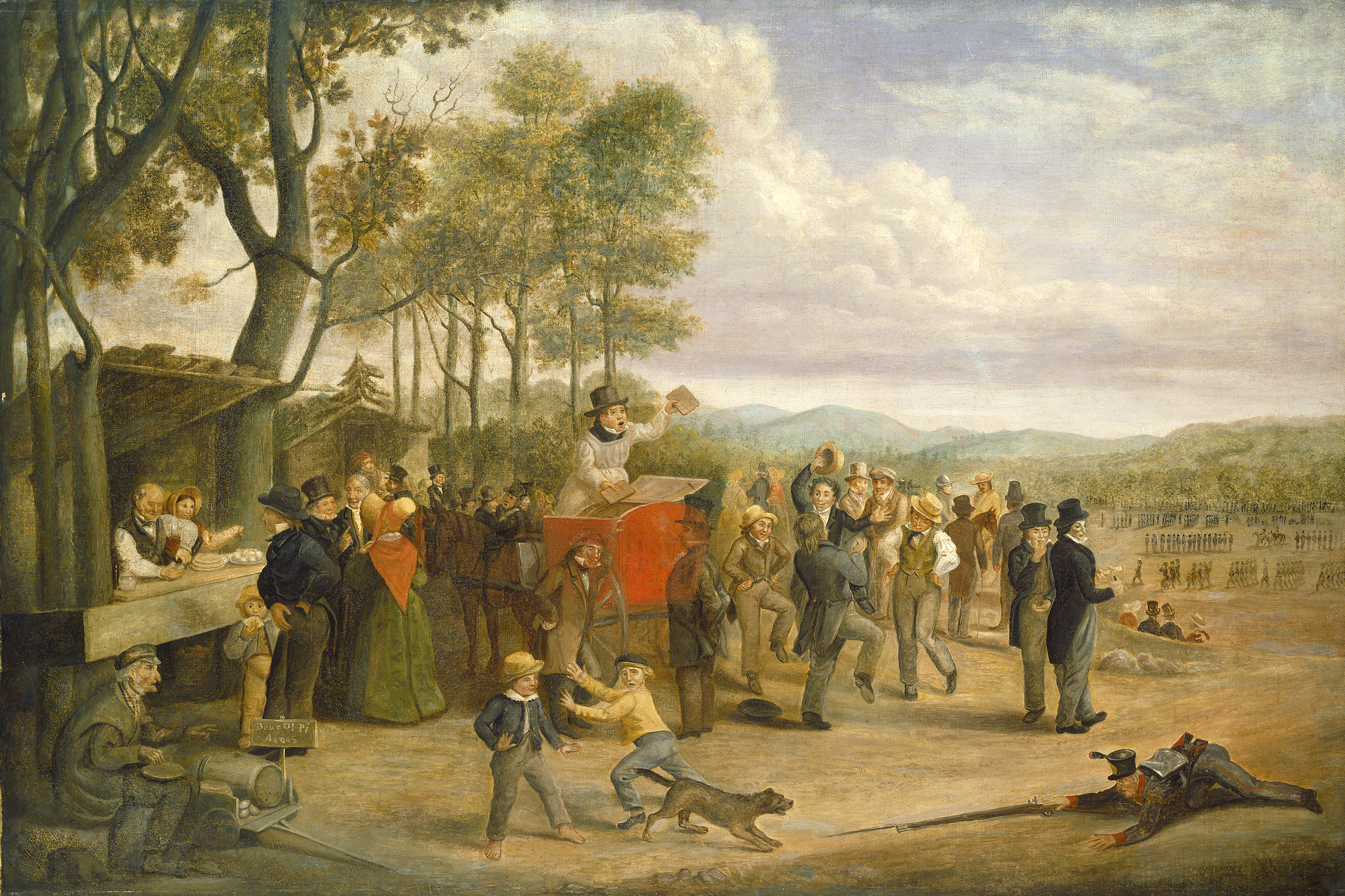
Muster Day, 1843 or after

He received some portrait commissions and other work, but also had to earn income through other means, including leading a church choir, teaching art, tuning pianos, and leading a band. An inventory in the Martha Kettelle's biography: Aloft on Butterflies' Wings: The Story of the Artist Charles Henry Granger and His Family" includes only about forty-one located works, whereas an account in one of Granger's sketchbooks states that between 1832 and 1845, he executed between 187 and 250 oil paintings as well as two sculptures, various poems, musical compositions, and so forth. Eventually, in 1842, the Grangers returned to Saco, although he continued to travel in search of work for several years before settling there permanently in 1847.

In 1866, Granger helped found the York Institute with men from widely different backgrounds, who shared an interest in the pursuit of knowledge. Their pledge was that none of them should die in possession of an uncommunicated historical fact. The stated purpose of the organization was "to promote the study of Natural History; encourage Science and Art; also to collect and preserve whatever relates to the Natural and Civic history of York County." By the 1880s, the Institute could boast of members from across the United States, and corresponding members from all over the world, including Emperor Pedro II of Brazil.

Around 1870, Granger was commissioned by the York Institute to paint a portrait of John James Audubon, which he copied after a painting by Henry Inman. He delivered papers at the Institute on such diverse subjects as ventriloquism and the destruction of forests. Granger continued to paint until late in his life, executing "flower pieces" and portraits which were often copied from daguerreotypes. He died in Saco on September 8, 1893, after a number of illnesses. Granger seldom signed and dated his works. Only a small fraction of Granger's work is known. Granger's works include portraits of George Washington, Abraham Lincoln, John James Audubon, and a copy of the George Stuart portrait of General Henry Knox. The Smithsonian American Art Museum comprehensive listings the Inventory of American Paintings Executed before 1914 include only three paintings by Granger:
