= George G. Grainger =

American football player and coach (1876–1944)

Biographical details
- Born: October 24, 1876; New York, New York, U.S.
- Died: May 4, 1944 (aged 67); Brooklyn, New York, U.S.

Playing career
- 1895–1897: Fordham

Coaching career (HC unless noted)
- 1894–1896: Fordham

Head coaching record
- Overall: 9–4

George G. Grainger (October 24, 1876 – May 4, 1944) was an American college football player and coach. He was the head football coach at Fordham University for three seasons, from 1894 to 1896, compiling a record of 9–4.

== Head coaching record ==
Year	Team	Overall	Conference	Standing	Bowl/playoffs
Fordham (Independent) (1894–1896)
1894	Fordham	6–1			
1895	Fordham	0–2			
1896	Fordham	3–1			
Fordham:		9–4			
Total:		9–4			
