= Flavel K. Granger =

American politician and lawyer

Flavel Kingsley Granger (May 16, 1832 – June 10, 1905) was an American politician and lawyer.

Granger was born in Wayne County, New York and went to the public schools in Sodus, New York. He moved to Waukegan, Illinois in 1853 and studied law. In 1855, Granger was admitted to the Illinois bar and moved to McHenry, Illinois to practice law. He was also involved in livestock, wool production, and farm produce business. Granger served in the Illinois House of Representatives from 1873 to 1879 and was a Republican and in the Illinois Senate from 1897 to 1901. Granger died from a stroke at his home in McHenry, Illinois.
