= 27th Iowa Infantry Regiment =

- Iowa state flag
- Active: October 3, 1862, to August 8, 1865
- Country: United States
- Allegiance: Union
- Branch: Infantry
- Engagements: Red River Campaign; Battle of Pleasant Hill; Battle of Nashville

The 27th Iowa Infantry Regiment served in the Union Army during the American Civil War.

== Service ==
The 27th Iowa Infantry was organized at Dubuque, Iowa and mustered in for three years of Federal service on October 3, 1862. As soon as it was mustered in the Regiment was sent north to help deal with the Sioux uprising in Minnesota. Iowa was in the Army's newly formed Department of the Northwest commanded by Major General John Pope at Fort Snelling.

The regiment was mustered out on August 8, 1865.

== Total strength and casualties ==
A total of 1172 men served in the 27th Iowa at one time or another during its existence. It suffered 1 officer and 23 enlisted men who were killed in action or who died of their wounds, and 2 officers and 167 enlisted men who died of disease, for a total of 193 fatalities.

== Commanders ==
- Colonel James I. Gilbert
- Lieutenant Colonel Jed Lake

== See also ==
- List of Iowa Civil War Units
- Iowa in the American Civil War
