= 1877 Iowa Senate election =

- October 9, 1877

24 out of 50 seats in the Iowa State Senate 26 seats needed for a majority
	Majority party	Minority party
Party	Republican	Democratic
Last election	40	10
Seats after	38	12
Seat change	▼2	▲2

In the 1877 Iowa State Senate elections, Iowa voters elected state senators to serve in the seventeenth Iowa General Assembly. Elections were held in 24 of the state senate's 50 districts. State senators serve four-year terms in the Iowa State Senate.

The general election took place on October 9, 1877.

Following the previous election, Republicans had control of the Iowa Senate with 40 seats to Democrats' 10 seats.

To claim control of the chamber from Republicans, the Democrats needed to net 16 Senate seats.

Republicans maintained control of the Iowa State Senate following the 1877 general election with the balance of power shifting to Republicans holding 38 seats and Democrats having 12 seats (a net gain of 2 seats for Democrats).

== Summary of Results ==
- Note: Redistricting occurred before the 1877 general election. Any holdover Senators not up for re-election and whose district numbers did not change are unlisted on this table.

Senate District	Incumbent	Party	Elected Senator	Party	Outcome
1st	Henry W. Rothert	Rep	James Madison Shelley	Dem	Dem Gain
2nd (Note: There was not an election in this senatorial district in 1877. Instead, the incumbent holdover senator was redistricted into a new district number.)	James Blakeny Pease	Dem	Horatio A. Wonn (Note: Senator Wonn was an incumbent holdover Senator. He was redistricted from district 3 to 2.)	Dem	Dem Hold
3rd	Horatio A. Wonn	Dem	Joshua Miller (Note: Senator Miller was an incumbent holdover Senator. He was redistricted from district 4 to 3.)	Rep	Rep Gain
4th	Joshua Miller	Rep	Henry Laurens Dashiell (Note: Senator Dashiell was an incumbent holdover Senator. He was redistricted from district 5 to 4.)	Rep	Rep Hold
5th	Henry Laurens Dashiell	Rep	Samuel L. Bestow (Note: Senator Bestow was an incumbent holdover Senator. He was redistricted from district 6 to 5.)	Rep	Rep Hold
6th	Samuel L. Bestow	Rep	Frederick Joseph Teale (Note: Senator Teale was an incumbent holdover Senator. He was redistricted from district 7 to 6.)	Rep	Rep Hold
7th	Frederick Joseph Teale	Rep	Philip W. Lewellen	Rep	Rep Hold
9th	George Franklin Wright (Note: Senator Wright was an incumbent holdover Senator. He was redistricted from district 9 to 19.)	Rep	John Patterson	Rep	Rep Hold
10th	John Wilson Williams	Rep	John Simson Woolson (Note: Senator Woolson was an incumbent Senator; however, he was up for re-election. He was redistricted from district 11 to 10.)	Rep	Rep Hold
11th	John Simson Woolson	Rep	Moses Ayres McCoid (Note: Senator McCoid was an incumbent holdover Senator. He was redistricted from district 12 to 11.)	Rep	Rep Hold
12th	Moses Ayres McCoid	Rep	Sanford S. Harned	Dem	Dem Gain
13th	Joseph Henry Merrill	Rep	Gregg A. Madison	Dem	Dem Gain
14th	Hosea N. Newton (Note: Senator Newton was an incumbent Senator. He was redistricted from district 14 to 12.)	Rep	William Wilson (Note: Senator Wilson was an incumbent holdover Senator. He was redistricted from district 15 to 14.)	Dem	Dem Gain
15th	William Wilson	Dem	Thomas R. Gilmore (Note: Senator Gilmore was an incumbent holdover Senator. He was redistricted from district 18 to 15.)	Rep	Rep Gain
16th	Henry Thornburgh (Note: Senator Thornburgh was an incumbent Senator. He was redistricted from district 16 to 31.)	Rep	John L. McCormack (Note: Senator McCormack was an incumbent holdover Senator. He was redistricted from district 19 to 16.)	Dem	Dem Gain
17th	Lafayette Young (Note: Senator Young was an incumbent Senator; however, he was up for re-election. He was redistricted from district 17 to 18.)	Rep	William Graham (Note: Senator Graham was an incumbent holdover Senator. He was redistricted from district 20 to 17.)	Rep	Rep Hold
18th	Thomas R. Gilmore	Rep	Lafayette Young	Rep	Rep Hold
19th	John L. McCormack	Dem	George Franklin Wright	Rep	Rep Gain
20th	William Graham	Rep	Thomas Hanna	Rep	Rep Hold
21st	Gilbert H. Wood	Rep	William A. Foster	Rep	Rep Hold
22nd	Jeremiah Henry Murphy (Note: Senator Murphy was an incumbent Senator; however, he was up for re-election. He was redistricted from district 22 to 21.)	Dem	Nathaniel Anson Merrell (Note: Senator Merrell was an incumbent Senator; however, he was up for re-election. He was redistricted from district 23 to 22.)	Dem	Dem Hold
23rd	Nathaniel Anson Merrell	Dem	Henry C. Carr (Note: Senator Carr was an incumbent holdover Senator. He was redistricted from district 24 to 23.)	Rep	Rep Gain
24th	Henry C. Carr	Rep	William A. Maginnis (Note: Senator Maginnis was an incumbent holdover Senator. He was redistricted from district 30 to 24.)	Dem	Dem Gain
27th	Frank T. Campbell (Note: Instead of running for re-election, Senator Campbell was elected Lieutenant Governor of Iowa in 1877.)	Rep	Stephen Leland Dows (Note: Senator Dows was an incumbent holdover Senator. He was redistricted from district 32 to 27.)	Rep	Rep Hold
28th (Note: Election was held to fill a vacancy.)	Thomas Mitchell (Note: Senator Mitchell was an incumbent Senator. He was redistricted from district 28 to 30.)	Rep	John David Nichols	Rep	Rep Hold
29th	Elias Jessup (Note: Senator Jessup was an incumbent Senator. He was redistricted from district 29 to 37.)	Rep	John Meyer	Rep	Rep Hold
30th	William A. Maginnis	Dem	Robert C. Webb	Rep	Rep Gain
31st	George W. Lovell (Note: Senator Lovell was an incumbent Senator. He was redistricted from district 31 to 23.)	Dem	Samuel D. Nichols (Note: Senator Nichols was an incumbent holdover Senator. He was redistricted from district 49 to 31.)	Rep	Rep Gain
32nd	Stephen Leland Dows	Rep	Delos Arnold (Note: Senator Arnold was an incumbent holdover Senator. He was redistricted from district 34 to 32.)	Rep	Rep Hold
33rd	John Shane (Note: Senator Shane was an incumbent Senator. He was redistricted from district 33 to 28.)	Rep	William Harrison Gallup (Note: Senator Gallup was an incumbent holdover Senator. He was redistricted from district 45 to 33.)	Rep	Rep Hold
34th	Delos Arnold	Rep	Augustin W. Ford	Rep	Rep Hold
35th	Dennis Nelson Cooley	Rep	Moses M. Ham	Dem	Dem Gain
36th	Lewis Greenleaf Hersey (Note: Senator Hersey resigned, causing a vacancy.)	Rep	Charles E. Bronson	Dem	Dem Gain
37th	Merritt W. Harmon (Note: Senator Harmon was an incumbent holdover Senator. He was redistricted from district 37 to 39.)	Rep	Daniel Darrow Chase	Rep	Rep Hold
38th	John Conaway (Note: Senator Conaway was an incumbent Senator. He was redistricted from district 38 to 45.)	Rep	Herman C. Hemenway	Rep	Rep Hold
39th	John Thompson Stoneman (Note: Senator Stoneman was an incumbent holdover Senator. He was redistricted from district 39 to 40.)	Dem	Merritt W. Harmon	Rep	Rep Gain
40th	William Larrabee (Note: Senator Larrabee was an incumbent holdover Senator. He was redistricted from district 40 to 43.)	Rep	John Thompson Stoneman	Dem	Dem Gain
42nd	George R. Willett	Rep	Martin Nelson Johnson	Rep	Rep Hold
43rd	Arad Hitchcock (Note: Senator Hitchcock was an incumbent Senator. He was redistricted from district 43 to 46. On March 16, 1876, Senator Hitchcock died, causing a vacancy in his new 46th district.)	Rep	William Larrabee	Rep	Rep Hold
44th	Edward Gee Miller (Note: Senator Miller was an incumbent Senator. He was redistricted from district 44 to 38.)	Rep	Aaron Kimball	Rep	Rep Hold
45th	William Harrison Gallup	Rep	Robert M. Haines	Rep	Rep Hold
46th	Lemuel Dwelle (Note: Senator Dwelle was an incumbent holdover Senator. He was redistricted from district 46 to 47.)	Rep	William Wallace Blackman	Rep	Rep Hold
47th	Elden J. Hartshorn (Note: Senator Hartshorn was an incumbent holdover Senator. He was redistricted from district 47 to 49.)	Rep	Lemuel Dwelle	Rep	Rep Hold
48th	Hiram Bailey (Note: Senator Bailey was an incumbent Senator. He was redistricted from district 48 to 44.)	Rep	John J. Russell	Rep	Rep Hold
49th	Samuel D. Nichols	Rep	Elden J. Hartshorn	Rep	Rep Hold
50th	George Douglas Perkins	Rep	Albert Henry Lawrence	Rep	Rep Hold

== Detailed Results ==
- NOTE: The Iowa Official Register does not contain detailed vote totals for state senate elections in 1877.

== See also ==
- Elections in Iowa
