= 1879 Iowa Senate election =

- October 14, 1879

29 out of 50 seats in the Iowa State Senate 26 seats needed for a majority
| | Majority party | Minority party | Third party |
|---|---|---|---|
| Party | Republican | Democratic | Greenback |
| Last election | 38 | 12 | 0 |
| Seats after | 41 | 7 | 2 |
| Seat change | ▲3 | ▼5 | ▲2 |

In the 1879 Iowa State Senate elections Iowa voters elected state senators to serve in the eighteenth Iowa General Assembly. Elections were held in 29 of the state senate's 50 districts. State senators serve four-year terms in the Iowa State Senate.

The general election took place on October 14, 1879.

Following the previous election, Republicans had control of the Iowa Senate with 38 seats to Democrats' 12 seats.

To claim control of the chamber from Republicans, the Democrats needed to net 14 Senate seats.

Republicans maintained control of the Iowa State Senate following the 1879 general election with the balance of power shifting to Republicans holding 41 seats, Democrats having 7 seats, and 2 Greenbackers (a net gain of 3 seats for Republicans and 2 for Greenbackers).

== Summary of Results ==
- Note: The holdover Senators not up for re-election are not listed on this table.

| Senate District | Incumbent | Party | Elected Senator | Party | Outcome |
|---|---|---|---|---|---|
| 2nd | Horatio A. Wonn | Dem | Henry Clay Traverse (Note: Senator Traverse resigned during the next term, causing a vacancy.) | Rep | Rep Gain |
| 3rd | Joshua Miller | Rep | Jesse J. Wall | Greenbacker | Greenback Gain |
| 4th | Henry Laurens Dashiell | Rep | David M. Clark | Greenbacker | Greenback Gain |
| 5th | Samuel L. Bestow | Rep | William M. Wilson | Rep | Rep Hold |
| 6th | Frederick Joseph Teale | Rep | Isaac W. Keller | Rep | Rep Hold |
| 8th | Alfred Hebard | Rep | Alfred Hebard | Rep | Rep Hold |
| 11th | Moses Ayres McCoid (Note: Senator McCoid resigned his seat in the Iowa Senate after being elected to the United States House of Representatives, causing a vacancy.) | Rep | Sanford M. Boling | Rep | Rep Hold |
| 14th | William Wilson | Dem | John Wesley Prizer | Rep | Rep Gain |
| 15th | Thomas R. Gilmore | Rep | John Kelly Johnson | Rep | Rep Hold |
| 16th | John L. McCormack | Dem | James F. Greenlee | Rep | Rep Gain |
| 17th | William Graham | Rep | Mark Antony Dashiell | Rep | Rep Hold |
| 19th | George Franklin Wright | Rep | George Franklin Wright | Rep | Rep Hold |
| 23rd | Henry C. Carr | Rep | John Russell | Rep | Rep Hold |
| 24th | William A. Maginnis | Dem | Pierce Mitchell | Dem | Dem Hold |
| 25th | Ezekiel Clark | Rep | John Clinton Shrader | Rep | Rep Hold |
| 26th | John Nicholas William Rumple | Rep | Christian Hedges (Note: Senator Hedges resigned during the next term, causing a vacancy.) | Rep | Rep Hold |
| 27th | Stephen Leland Dows | Rep | John Wimberly Henderson (Note: Senator Henderson was elected Senator in 1879 running on the Democratic ticket. He switched parties from Democratic to Independent in the next term, however.) | Dem | Dem Gain |
| 28th | John David Nichols | Rep | John David Nichols | Rep | Rep Hold |
| 31st | Samuel D. Nichols | Rep | Samuel D. Nichols | Rep | Rep Hold |
| 32nd | Delos Arnold | Rep | Delos Arnold | Rep | Rep Hold |
| 33rd | William Harrison Gallup | Rep | John Dudley Gillett | Rep | Rep Hold |
| 36th | Charles E. Bronson | Dem | Rodney W. Tirrill | Rep | Rep Gain |
| 39th | Merritt W. Harmon | Rep | Merritt W. Harmon | Rep | Rep Hold |
| 40th | John Thompson Stoneman | Dem | Martin Garber | Rep | Rep Gain |
| 41st | Samuel Horace Kinne | Dem | Henry Nielander | Rep | Rep Gain |
| 43rd | William Larrabee | Rep | William Larrabee | Rep | Rep Hold |
| 46th | William Wallace Blackman | Rep | Wilberforce P. Gaylord (Note: Senator Gaylord died on April 27, 1880 during the next term, causing a vacancy.) | Rep | Rep Hold |
| 47th | Lemuel Dwelle | Rep | Frank M. Goodykoontz (Note: Senator Goodykoontz resigned during the next term, causing a vacancy.) | Rep | Rep Hold |
| 49th | Elden J. Hartshorn | Rep | Elden J. Hartshorn | Rep | Rep Hold |

== Detailed Results ==
- NOTE: The Iowa Official Register does not contain detailed vote totals for state senate elections in 1879.

== See also ==
- Elections in Iowa
