= 1875 Iowa Senate election =

- October 12, 1875

30 out of 50 seats in the Iowa State Senate 26 seats needed for a majority
	Majority party	Minority party	Third party
Party	Republican	Democratic	Anti-Monopoly
Last election	36	10	4
Seats after	40	10	0
Seat change	▲4	Steady	▼4
- Democratic hold Republican hold Democratic gain Republican gain

In the 1875 Iowa State Senate elections, Iowa voters elected state senators to serve in the sixteenth Iowa General Assembly. Elections were held in 30 of the state senate's 50 districts. State senators serve four-year terms in the Iowa State Senate.

The general election took place on October 12, 1875.

Following the previous election, Republicans had control of the Iowa Senate with 36 seats to Democrats' 10 seats and four members of the Anti-Monopoly Party.

To claim control of the chamber from Republicans, the Democrats needed to net 16 Senate seats.

Republicans maintained control of the Iowa State Senate following the 1875 general election with the balance of power shifting to Republicans holding 40 seats and Democrats having 10 seats (a net gain of 4 seats for Republicans).

== Summary of Results ==
- Note: The holdover Senators not up for re-election are not listed on this table.

Senate District	Incumbent	Party	Elected Senator	Party	Outcome
2nd (Note: There was not an election in this senatorial district in 1875. Instead, the incumbent switched parties.)	James Blakeny Pease	Anti-Monopoly	James Blakeny Pease (Note: Senator Pease switched parties from Anti-Monopoly to Democratic.)	Dem	Dem Gain
3rd	Horatio A. Wonn	Dem	Horatio A. Wonn	Dem	Dem Hold
4th	Edward J. Gault	Dem	Joshua Miller	Rep	Rep Gain
5th	Lloyd Selby	Dem	Henry Laurens Dashiell	Rep	Rep Gain
6th	Robert A. Dague	Rep	Samuel L. Bestow	Rep	Rep Hold
7th	Elisha Todd Smith	Rep	Frederick Joseph Teale	Rep	Rep Hold
8th	James Stormant McIntyre	Rep	Alfred Hebard	Rep	Rep Hold
9th	John Young Stone	Rep	George Franklin Wright	Rep	Rep Hold
11th (Note: Election was held to fill a vacancy.)	John Patterson West (Note: Senator West resigned, causing a vacancy.)	Rep	John S. Woolson	Rep	Rep Hold
12th	Moses Ayres McCoid	Rep	Moses Ayres McCoid	Rep	Rep Hold
14th	Hosea N. Newton	Anti-Monopoly	Hosea N. Newton (Note: Senator Newton switched parties from Anti-Monopoly to Republican.)	Rep	Rep Gain
15th	Joseph Decker Miles	Rep	William Wilson	Dem	Dem Gain
16th	Henry Thornburgh	Dem	Henry Thornburgh (Note: Senator Thornburgh switched parties from Democratic to Republican.)	Rep	Rep Gain
18th	James Addison Young (Note: On March 9, 1875, Senator Young died, causing a vacancy.)	Rep	Thomas R. Gilmore	Rep	Rep Hold
19th	John L. McCormack	Dem	John L. McCormack	Dem	Dem Hold
20th	Mark Antony Dashiell	Rep	William Graham	Rep	Rep Hold
21st	Gilbert H. Wood	Anti-Monopoly	Gilbert H. Wood (Note: Senator Wood switched parties from Anti-Monopoly to Republican.)	Rep	Rep Gain
24th	John C. Chambers	Rep	Henry C. Carr	Rep	Rep Hold
25th	Samuel Husband Fairall	Dem	Ezekiel Clark	Rep	Rep Gain
26th	John Nicholas William Rumple	Rep	John Nicholas William Rumple	Rep	Rep Hold
30th	Lewis W. Stuart	Dem	William A. Maginnis	Dem	Dem Hold
31st	George W. Lovell	Anti-Monopoly	George W. Lovell (Note: Senator Lovell switched parties from Anti-Monopoly to Democratic.)	Dem	Dem Gain
32nd	Ezekiel Boring Kephart	Rep	Stephen Leland Dows	Rep	Rep Hold
33rd	John Shane	Rep	John Shane	Rep	Rep Hold
34th	Robert Howe Taylor	Rep	Delos Arnold	Rep	Rep Hold
36th	Albert Boomer	Rep	Lewis Greenleaf Hersey	Rep	Rep Hold
37th	George Washington Bemis	Rep	Merritt W. Harmon	Rep	Rep Hold
39th	Oliver Wolcott Crary	Rep	John Thompson Stoneman	Dem	Dem Gain
40th	William Larrabee	Rep	William Larrabee	Rep	Rep Hold
41st	Samuel Horace Kinne	Dem	Samuel Horace Kinne	Dem	Dem Hold
43rd	Alonzo Converse	Rep	Arad Hitchcock (Note: On March 16, 1876, Senator Hitchcock died during the next term, causing a vacancy in his new 46th district.)	Rep	Rep Hold
45th	George M. Maxwell	Rep	William Harrison Gallup	Rep	Rep Hold
46th	Elisha A. Howland	Rep	Lemuel Dwelle	Rep	Rep Hold
47th	William H. Fitch	Rep	Elden J. Hartshorn	Rep	Rep Hold
49th	John J. Russell	Rep	Samuel D. Nichols	Rep	Rep Hold

== Detailed Results ==
- NOTE: The Iowa Official Register does not contain detailed vote totals for state senate elections in 1875.

== See also ==
- Elections in Iowa
