= 1881 Iowa Senate election =

- October 11, 1881

25 out of 50 seats in the Iowa State Senate 26 seats needed for a majority
	Majority party	Minority party	Third party
Party	Republican	Democratic	Greenback
Last election	41	7	2
Seats after	45	2	2
Seat change	▲4	▼5	Steady
	Fourth party
Party	Independent
Last election	0
Seats after	1
Seat change	▲1

In the 1881 Iowa State Senate elections Iowa voters elected state senators to serve in the nineteenth Iowa General Assembly. Elections were held in 25 of the state senate's 50 districts. State senators serve four-year terms in the Iowa State Senate.

The general election took place on October 11, 1881.

Following the previous election, Republicans had control of the Iowa Senate with 41 seats to Democrats' seven seats and two Greenbackers.

To claim control of the chamber from Republicans, the Democrats needed to net 19 Senate seats.

Republicans maintained control of the Iowa State Senate following the 1881 general election with the balance of power shifting to Republicans holding 45 seats, Democrats having two seats, two Greenbackers, and one Independent (a net gain of 4 seats for Republicans and 1 Independent seat).

== Summary of Results ==
- Note: The holdover Senators not up for re-election are not listed on this table.

Senate District	Incumbent	Party	Elected Senator	Party	Outcome
1st	James Madison Shelley	Dem	Henry W. Rothert	Rep	Rep Gain
2nd (Note: Election was held to fill a vacancy.)	Henry Clay Traverse (Note: Senator Traverse resigned, causing a vacancy.)	Rep	Alexander Brown	Rep	Rep Hold
7th	Philip W. Lewellen	Rep	Talton Embrey Clark	Rep	Rep Hold
9th	John Patterson	Rep	Benton J. Hall (Note: During the next term, Senator Hall resigned his seat in the Iowa Senate after being elected to the United States House of Representatives, causing a vacancy.)	Dem	Dem Gain
10th	John Simpson Woolson	Rep	Lot Abraham	Rep	Rep Hold
12th	Sanford S. Harned	Dem	Cassius M. Brown	Rep	Rep Gain
13th	Gregg A. Madison	Dem	Joseph G. Hutchison	Rep	Rep Gain
18th	Lafayette Young	Rep	Cephas B. Hunt	Rep	Rep Hold
20th	Thomas Hanna	Rep	Pliny Nichols	Rep	Rep Hold
21st	William A. Foster	Rep	John Carver Bills	Rep	Rep Hold
22nd	Nathaniel Anson Merrell	Dem	Wickliffe A. Cotton	Rep	Rep Gain
26th	Christian Hedges (Note: Senator Hedges resigned, causing a vacancy.)	Rep	William Aitken Patrick	Rep	Rep Hold
27th (Note: There was not an election in the twenty-seventh senatorial district in 1881. Instead, incumbent Senator John Wimberly Henderson switched parties.)	John Wimberly Henderson (Note: Senator Henderson was an incumbent Senator who was not up for election in 1881. Instead, he switched parties from Democratic to Independent.)	Dem	John Wimberly Henderson	Ind	Ind. Gain
29th	John Meyer	Rep	Egbert C. Sudlow	Rep	Rep Hold
30th	Robert C. Webb	Rep	Hiram Ypsilanti Smith (Note: During the next term, Senator Smith resigned his seat in the Iowa Senate after being elected to the United States House of Representatives, causing a vacancy.)	Rep	Rep Hold
34th	Augustin W. Ford	Rep	Thomas M. C. Logan	Rep	Rep Hold
35th	Moses M. Ham	Dem	Julius Kingman Graves	Rep	Rep Gain
37th	Daniel Darrow Chase	Rep	John L. Kamrar	Rep	Rep Hold
38th	Herman C. Hemenway	Rep	Herman C. Hemenway	Rep	Rep Hold
42nd	Martin Nelson Johnson	Rep	Henry A. Baker	Rep	Rep Hold
44th	Aaron Kimball	Rep	Chapman A. Marshall	Rep	Rep Hold
45th	Robert M. Haines	Rep	Alfred Nelson Poyneer	Rep	Rep Hold
46th	Wilberforce P. Gaylord (Note: Senator Gaylord died on April 27, 1880, causing a vacancy.)	Rep	Alvin Manley Whaley (Note: Senator Whaley filled the vacancy caused by Senator Gaylord's death.)	Rep	Rep Hold
47th	Frank M. Goodykoontz (Note: Senator Goodykoontz resigned, causing a vacancy.)	Rep	Horace G. Parker (Note: Senator Parker filled the vacancy caused by Senator Goodykoontz's resignation.)	Rep	Rep Hold
48th	John J. Russell	Rep	John J. Russell	Rep	Rep Hold
50th	Albert Henry Lawrence	Rep	Gifford Simeon Robinson	Rep	Rep Hold

== Detailed Results ==
- NOTE: The Iowa Official Register does not contain detailed vote totals for state senate elections in 1881.

== See also ==
- Elections in Iowa
