= 1885 Iowa Senate election =

- November 3, 1885

24 out of 50 seats in the Iowa State Senate 26 seats needed for a majority
	Majority party	Minority party
Party	Republican	Democratic
Last election	39	11
Seats after	31	19
Seat change	▼8	▲8

In the 1885 Iowa State Senate elections Iowa voters elected state senators to serve in the twenty-first Iowa General Assembly. Elections were held in 24 of the state senate's 50 districts. State senators serve four-year terms in the Iowa State Senate.

The general election took place on November 3, 1885.

Following the previous election, Republicans had control of the Iowa Senate with 39 seats to Democrats' 11 seats.

To claim control of the chamber from Republicans, the Democrats needed to net 15 Senate seats.

Republicans maintained control of the Iowa State Senate following the 1885 general election with the balance of power shifting to Republicans holding 31 seats and Democrats having 19 seats (a net gain of 8 seats for Democrats).

== Summary of Results ==
- Note: The holdover Senators not up for re-election are not listed on this table.

Senate District	Incumbent	Party	Elected Senator	Party	Outcome
1st	Henry W. Rothert	Rep	Joseph M. Casey (Note: Senator Casey resigned during the next term, causing a vacancy.)	Dem	Dem Gain
7th	Talton Embrey Clark	Rep	Talton Embrey Clark	Rep	Rep Hold
9th	Benton J. Hall (Note: Senator Hall resigned his seat in the Iowa Senate after being elected to the United States House of Representatives, causing a vacancy.)	Dem	William W. Dodge	Dem	Dem Hold
10th	Lot Abraham	Rep	John Simson Woolson	Rep	Rep Hold
12th (Note: Districts in the Iowa Senate were redrawn in advance of the 1885 election. Several incumbents were redistricted to new district numbers between the 20th and 21st Iowa General Assemblies. Use these links to compared the districts:20th (1884-1885) and 21st (1886-1887).)	Cassius M. Brown	Rep	Joseph G. Hutchison (Note: Senator Hutchison was redistricted from district 13 to 12. He was re-elected to the Senate to the new 12th district in 1885.)	Rep	Rep Hold
13th	Joseph G. Hutchison	Rep	James Dooley	Dem	Dem Gain
18th	Cephas B. Hunt	Rep	Lafayette Young	Rep	Rep Hold
20th	Pliny Nichols	Rep	Samuel Tyler Chesebro	Dem	Dem Gain
21st	John Carver Bills	Rep	William O. Schmidt	Dem	Dem Gain
22nd	Wickliffe A. Cotton	Rep	Patrick Bernard Wolfe	Dem	Dem Gain
29th	Egbert C. Sudlow	Rep	Malcolm P. Doud	Rep	Rep Hold
30th	Hiram Ypsilanti Smith (Note: Senator Smith resigned his seat in the Iowa Senate after being elected to the United States House of Representatives, causing a vacancy.)	Rep	Conduce H. Gatch	Rep	Rep Hold
31st (Note: Election was held to fill a vacancy.)	John Dudley Gillett (Note: Senator Gillett resigned, causing a vacancy.)	Rep	John Scott	Rep	Rep Hold
32nd	Enoch W. Eastman (Note: On January 9, 1885, Senator Eastman died, causing a vacancy.)	Rep	Myron Underwood	Rep	Rep Hold
34th	Thomas M. C. Logan	Rep	Lemuel Rose Bolter	Dem	Dem Gain
35th	Julius Kingman Graves	Rep	William J. Knight	Dem	Dem Gain
37th	John L. Kamrar	Rep	Nicholas F. Weber	Rep	Rep Hold
38th	Herman C. Hemenway	Rep	Mathies Parrott	Rep	Rep Hold
40th	William Larrabee (Note: Senator Larrabee was elected Governor of Iowa in 1885, causing a vacancy in the Iowa Senate.)	Rep	Willard Chauncey Earle	Dem	Dem Gain
42nd	Henry A. Baker	Rep	Theodore Weld Burdick (Note: Senator Burdick resigned during the next term, causing a vacancy.)	Rep	Rep Hold
44th	Chapman A. Marshall	Rep	Robert George Reiniger	Rep	Rep Hold
45th	Alfred Nelson Poyneer	Rep	Alfred Nelson Poyneer	Rep	Rep Hold
48th	John J. Russell	Rep	John Kelsey Deal	Rep	Rep Hold
50th	Gifford Simeon Robinson	Rep	Gifford Simeon Robinson (Note: Senator Robinson resigned during the next term, causing a vacancy.)	Rep	Rep Hold

== Detailed Results ==
- NOTE: The Iowa Official Register does not contain detailed vote totals for state senate elections in 1885.

== See also ==
- Elections in Iowa
