= Rothrock =

Rothrock is a surname. Notable people with the surname include:

- Arthur Rothrock (1886–1938), American sport shooter
- Cynthia Rothrock (born 1957), American actress and martial artist
- George A. Rothrock (1932–1993), American university professor
- Jack Rothrock (1905–1980), American baseball player
- James H. Rothrock (1829–1899), American judge
- Joseph Rothrock (1839–1922), American environmentalist
- Joseph J. Rothrock (1898–1968), American college sports coach
- Keagan Rothrock (born 2005), American softball player
- Mary U. Rothrock (1890–1976), American librarian and historian
- Paul Rothrock (born 1999), American professional soccer player
- Tom Rothrock, American record producer, composer and musician

== See also ==
- Rothrock Field Airport, private airport in Oregon
- Rothrock Stadium in Jackson, Tennessee
- Rothrock State Forest in Pennsylvania
