= William M. Wilson =

William M. Wilson may refer to:

- William Wilson (botanist), English botanist
- William M. Wilson (politician), American politician in Iowa

== See also ==
- William Wilson (disambiguation)
