= James Madison Shelley =

American politician (1813–1891)

James Madison Shelley (26 January 1813 – 26 October 1891) was an American politician.

James Madison Shelley was born to parents Francis Shelley and Nancy Brown of Guilford County, North Carolina, on 26 January 1813. Both of his grandfathers served under Nathanael Greene in the American Revolutionary War and saw military action during the Battle of Guilford Court House. His mother, father, and seven siblings lived near Greensboro. Shelley worked for John Motley Morehead from 1836 to 1838 in Leaksville, North Carolina, and was later a partner of P. S. Hamlin's tobacco manufacturing business. While working alongside Hamlin, Shelley spent two years in the New Orleans area. Shelley subsequently moved to Calloway County, Kentucky, to continue his business pursuits and serve as justice of the peace.

By 1849, Shelley had moved to Keokuk, Iowa. As a Keokuk resident, he became a wholesaler of dry goods, an investor in real estate, and president of the Iowa Life Insurance Company. Shelley began his political career affiliated with Henry Clay's Whig Party. Upon its dissolution, Shelley became a member of the Republican Party until 1870, when he joined the Democratic Party. Shelley contested the 1872 United States House of Representatives election in Iowa as a Democrat. His candidacy in the 1873 Iowa Senate election was also unsuccessful. Shelley won the 1877 Iowa Senate election and succeeded Henry Rothert of the First District. Rothert returned to office in the 1881 Iowa Senate election.

Shelley married Louise J. Stubblefield of Calloway County, Kentucky, on 13 October 1842. The couple raised five children. In later life, Shelley was diagnosed with a bladder condition. The condition flared up in October 1891, and he was later affected by a "congestive chill" before dying at home in Keokuk on 26 October 1891.
