= Senator Kimball =

Senator Kimball may refer to:

- Aaron Kimball (1836–1899), Iowa State Senate
- Alanson M. Kimball (1827–1913), Wisconsin State Senate
- Art Kimball (1941–2014), Utah State Senate
- Bill Kimball (1908–1962), Arizona State Senate
- Clem F. Kimball (1868–1928), Iowa State Senate
- John Kimball (politician, born 1821) (1821–1913), New Hampshire State Senate
- John Kimball (politician, born 1796) (1796–1884), Vermont State Senate
- Martin L. Kimball (1826–1891), Wisconsin State Senate
- Thomas S. Kimball (1862–1939), Arizona State Senate
