= William W. Wilson =

William W. Wilson may refer to:

- William Warfield Wilson (1868–1942), U.S. Representative from Illinois
- William Wallace Wilson, Alberta politician
- William Wilber Wilfred Wilson (1885–1964), Canadian politician

== See also ==
- William Wilson (disambiguation)
