= 1873 Iowa Senate election =

- October 14, 1873

23 out of 50 seats in the Iowa State Senate 26 seats needed for a majority
	Majority party	Minority party	Third party
Party	Republican	Democratic	Anti-Monopoly
Last election	42	8	0
Seats after	36	10	4
Seat change	▼6	▲2	▲4
- Democratic hold Republican hold Democratic gain Republican gain Anti-Monopoly gain

In the 1873 Iowa State Senate elections, Iowa voters elected state senators to serve in the fifteenth Iowa General Assembly. Elections were held in 23 of the state senate's 50 districts. State senators serve four-year terms in the Iowa State Senate.

The general election took place on October 14, 1873.

Following the previous election, Republicans had control of the Iowa Senate with 42 seats to Democrats' eight seats.

To claim control of the chamber from Republicans, the Democrats needed to net 18 Senate seats.

Republicans maintained control of the Iowa State Senate following the 1873 general election with the balance of power shifting to Republicans holding 36 seats, Democrats having 10 seats, and four Anti-Monopoly members (a net gain of 2 seats for Democrats and 4 seats for the Anti-Monopoly Party).

== Summary of Results ==
- Note: Redistricting occurred before the 1873 general election. Any holdover Senators not up for re-election and whose district numbers did not change are unlisted on this table.

Senate District	Incumbent	Party	Elected Senator	Party	Outcome
1st	Exum Sumner McCulloch	Dem	Henry W. Rothert	Rep	Rep Gain
2nd	Jacob Garretson Vale	Rep	James Blakeny Pease	Anti-Monopoly	Anti-Monopoly Gain
5th (Note: Election was held to fill a vacancy.)	Martin Read (Note: Senator Read resigned, causing a vacancy.)	Rep	Lloyd Selby	Dem	Dem Gain
10th	Charles Beardsley	Rep	John Wilson Williams	Rep	Rep Hold
11th	John Patterson West	Rep	John Patterson West	Rep	Rep Hold
13th	Joseph Henry Merrill	Rep	Joseph Henry Merrill	Rep	Rep Hold
14th	James Simpson Hurley	Rep	Hosea N. Newton	Anti-Monopoly	Anti-Monopoly Gain
16th	Samuel McNutt	Rep	Henry Thornburgh	Dem	Dem Gain
17th	Joseph W. Havens	Rep	Lafayette Young	Rep	Rep Hold
21st	Benjamin Franklin Murray	Rep	Gilbert H. Wood	Anti-Monopoly	Anti-Monopoly Gain
22nd (Note: The 22nd transitioned from a 2- to 1-member district.)	Hans Reimer Claussen	Rep	Jeremiah Henry Murphy	Dem	Dem Gain
22nd	Robert Lowry	Rep	Jeremiah Henry Murphy	Dem	Dem Gain
23rd	Alexander Baird Ireland	Rep	Nathaniel Anson Merrell	Dem	Dem Gain
26th	James P. Ketcham (Note: Senator Ketcham resigned, causing a vacancy.)	Rep	John Nicholas William Rumple	Rep	Rep Hold
27th	Joseph Dysart	Rep	Frank T. Campbell (Note: Senator Campbell was an incumbent Senator running for re-election. He was redistricted from district 28 to 27.)	Rep	Rep Hold
28th	Frank T. Campbell	Rep	Thomas Mitchell	Rep	Rep Hold
29th	Benjamin Franklin Allen	Rep	Elias Jessup	Rep	Rep Hold
31st	John McKean (Note: On January 14, 1873, Senator McKean resigned, causing a vacancy. Senator Lovell originally filled the vacancy as a Republican. However, Lovell would switch party affiliation to Anti-Monopoly during his term.)	Rep	George W. Lovell (Note: Senator Lovell switched parties from Republican to Anti-Monopoly.)	Anti-Monopoly	Anti-Monopoly Gain
35th	Benjamin Billings Richards	Dem	Dennis Nelson Cooley	Rep	Rep Gain
38th	John Hooker Leavitt	Rep	John Conaway	Rep	Rep Hold
42nd	George R. Willett	Rep	George R. Willett	Rep	Rep Hold
44th	John E. Burke	Rep	Edward Gee Miller	Rep	Rep Hold
48th	Charles Atkins	Rep	Hiram Bailey	Rep	Rep Hold
50th (Note: The 50th district was newly created following redistricting.)	Newly created district		George Douglas Perkins	Rep	Rep Gain

== Detailed Results ==
- NOTE: The Iowa Official Register does not contain detailed vote totals for state senate elections in 1873.

== See also ==
- Elections in Iowa
