= William A. Wilson =

William A. Wilson may refer to:

- William A. Wilson (diplomat)
- William A. Wilson (folklorist)

== See also ==
- William Wilson (disambiguation)
