= William Wilson =

William Wilson, or variants, may refer to:

== Politicians ==
=== American ===
- Bill Wilson (activist) (born 1953), small government activist
- Bill Wilson (Montana politician) (born 1961), Montana state representative
- W. Eugene Wilson (William Eugene Wilson, 1929–2015), member of the North Carolina General Assembly
- Will Wilson (Texas politician) (1912–2005), politician, attorney, and judge in Texas
- William A. Wilson (diplomat) (1914–2009), first U.S. ambassador to the Holy See
- William B. Wilson (1862–1934), U.S. (Scottish-born) labor leader and political figure
  - SS William B. Wilson, a Liberty ship
- William C. Wilson (New York politician) (1866–1943), New York comptroller in 1906
- William E. Wilson (Indiana politician) (1870–1948), U.S. representative from Indiana
- William H. Wilson (New York politician) (c. 1873–1901), New York assemblyman
- William H. Wilson (1877–1937), U.S. representative from Pennsylvania, 1935–1937
- William K. Wilson (1817–1898), Wisconsin state senator
- William Lyne Wilson (1843–1900), US Postmaster General
- William Sydney Wilson (1816–1862), Confederate politician
- William T. Wilson (born 1937), member of the Virginia House of Delegates
- William Warfield Wilson (1868–1942), U.S. representative from Illinois
- William Wilson (Iowa politician) (1820–1900), Iowa state senator
- William M. Wilson (politician) (1838–1904), Iowa state senator
- William Wilson (Ohio politician) (1773–1827), U.S. representative from Ohio
- William Wilson (Pennsylvania politician), U.S. representative from Pennsylvania, 1815–1819
- William Wilson (Wisconsin politician) (1807–1892), Wisconsin state senator
- Bill Wilson, mayor of Santa Clara, California, founder of the Bill Wilson Center for homeless youth

=== British ===
- William Wilson (died 1582), MP for Southwark
- William Wilson (1720–1796), member of parliament for Ilchester, 1761–1768
- William Wilson (Donegal MP) (1836–1876), MP for Donegal 1876–1879
- William Wilson (Westhoughton MP) (1855–1921), trade unionist and member of parliament for Westhoughton
- William Wilson (Coventry MP) (1913–2010), British Labour member of parliament, 1964–1983
- Bill Wilson (Scottish politician) (William L. Wilson, born 1963), Scottish nationalist
- William Wilson, prime minister of the micronation Austenasia

=== Canadian ===
- Bill Wilson (chief) (1944–2025), hereditary chief and politician in British Columbia
- William Wilson (British Columbia politician) (1838–1922), merchant and politician in British Columbia
- William Wilson (New Brunswick politician) (1845–1921), politician in the Legislative Assembly of New Brunswick
- William Wilson (Upper Canada politician) (1789–1847), politician in Upper Canada
- William Wallace Wilson (1876–1967), Alberta politician
- William Wilber Wilfred Wilson (1885–1964), politician

=== Australian ===
- William Wilson (Queensland politician) (1832–1903), member of the Queensland Legislative Council
- William Wilson (Victorian politician) (1834–1891), member of the Victorian Legislative Assembly and Council

=== New Zealand ===
- William Wilson (mayor) (1819–1897), first mayor of Christchurch, 1868

== Sports ==
=== Association football ===
- William Wilson (defender), English footballer for Newcastle United and Bradford City
- Billy Willson (footballer, born 1875) (1875-1943), Scottish footballer see List of Bury F.C. players (1–24 appearances)
- Willie Wilson (footballer, born 1894) (1894–1956), Scottish footballer, played for Hearts and Cowdenbeath
- Billy Wilson (footballer, born 1896) (1896–1996), English footballer
- Willie Wilson (footballer, born 1900) (1900–1973), Scottish footballer
- Billy Wilson (American soccer) (fl. 1920s–30s)
- William Wilson (footballer, born 1902) (1902–1975), English footballer
- William Wilson (footballer, born 1915) (1915–?), English footballer
- William Wilson (footballer, born November 1915) (1915–1998), English footballer
- William Wilson (footballer, born 1921), Scottish football goalkeeper for Queen of the South and Third Lanark
- Billy Wilson (footballer, born 1936) (1936–2025), Northern Irish football player for Burnley
- Willie Wilson (footballer, born 1941) (1941–2001), Scottish footballer
- Billy Wilson (footballer, born 1946) (1946–2018), English footballer
- Billy Wilson (Scottish footballer), played for Airdrieonians FC and managed Albion Rovers F.C.
- Willie Wilson (footballer, born 1972), Scottish footballer
- William Wilson (footballer, born 2001), Kenyan footballer

=== Baseball ===
- William Wilson (baseball), American baseball player
- Will Wilson (baseball) (born 1998), American baseball player
- Willie Wilson (baseball) (born 1955), American baseball outfielder
- Willy Wilson (baseball) (1884–1925)
- Bill Wilson (catcher) (1867–1924), MLB catcher
- Bill Wilson (outfielder) (1928–2017), MLB outfielder
- Bill Wilson (pitcher) (1942–1993), Major League Baseball (MLB) pitcher
- Mookie Wilson (William Hayward Wilson, born 1956), MLB outfielder
- Mutt Wilson (William Clarence Wilson, 1896–1962), MLB pitcher

=== Australian rules football ===
- William Wilson (sportsman, born 1909) (1909–1976), Australian rules footballer for Essendon and cricketer for Victoria
- Bill Wilson (footballer) (1924–1969), player for Richmond and Glenelg
- Billy Wilson (footballer, born 1891) (1891–1957), player for Fitzroy
- Billy Wilson (footballer, born 2005), player for Carlton

=== Cricket ===
- William Wilson (cricketer, born 1912) (c. 1912–death unknown), Australian cricketer
- William Wilson (South African cricketer) (1925–2005)
- Billy Wilson (cricketer) (1868–1920), Australian cricketer

=== Rugby ===
- Billy Wilson (Australian rugby league) (1927–1993)
- Billy Wilson (New Zealand rugby league) (1889–1976), rugby league footballer of the 1910s, and 1920s for New Zealand, Wellington and Athletic
- Will Wilson (rugby union) (born 1997), English rugby union and rugby sevens player

=== Other sports ===
- William Wilson (aquatics) (1844–1912), Scottish writer on swimming, and the inventor of water polo
- Billy Wilson (running back), college football player
- William Wilson (field hockey) (1917–1984), American Olympic hockey player
- William George Wilson (1917–2007), sports cinematographer
- Willie Wilson (speedway rider) (1923–2016), Scottish speedway rider
- Billy Wilson (wide receiver) (1927–2009), NFL wide receiver
- William Wilson (swimmer) (born 1964), Filipino swimmer
- Willy Wilson (born 1980), Filipino basketball player
- William Wilson (wrestler), (1887–1955), British Olympic wrestler

== Arts and entertainment ==
- William Wilson (architect) (1641–1710), English architect, builder and sculptor
- William Wilson (poet) (1801–1860), Scottish-American poet, bookseller and publisher
- W. J. Wilson (William John Wilson, 1833–1909), actor, scene painter and stage manager
- William J. Wilson (1874–1936), Scottish theatre director, choreographer, stage manager, and actor
- William Hardy Wilson (1881–1955), Australian architect, artist and author
- William Wilson (artist) (1905–1972), Scottish stained glass artist, printmaker and watercolours
- William E. Wilson (photographer) (1853–1905), English portrait photographer
- William E. Wilson (writer) (1906–1988), American author and professor, son of the Indiana politician
- William Scott Wilson (born 1944), author and translator of samurai literature
- Will Wilson (artist) (born 1957), American painter of portraits, illustrations and trompe-l'œil works
- Will Wilson (photographer) (born 1969), Native American photographer
- William Wilson (vocalist), lead singer of Legion Within
- William Llewellyn Wilson, conductor, musician, teacher and music educator from Baltimore
- Willie Wilson (drummer) (born 1947), member of Quiver; worked with Pink Floyd, Al Stewart

== Business ==
- William Proctor Wilson (1921–2010), president of Buttrick Publishing Company
- Willie Wilson (businessman) (born 1948), Chicago businessman, musician, philanthropist, and political candidate
- W. R. Wilson (c. 1849–1900), an Australian businessman with extensive interests in mining and a racehorse owner and breeder
- William Wilson, businessman, founder of Price's Candles
- Bill Wilson, founder of US firearms manufacturer Wilson Combat

== Law and crime ==
- Billy Wilson (outlaw) (1862–1918), American outlaw who rode with Billy the Kid
- Bill Wilson (convict) (1880–19??), convicted of murdering two individuals who were later found alive
- Billy Roy Wilson (William Roy Wilson Jr., 1939–2025), US federal judge
- William Wilson (Illinois judge) (1794–1857), chief justice of the Illinois Supreme Court
- Bill Wilson (judge), New Zealand judge of the Supreme Court and Court of Appeal
- William C. Wilson (judge) (1812–1882), Vermont lawyer and judge
- William Adam Wilson (1928–1994), professor of Scots Law at Edinburgh University
- William Rae Wilson (1772–1849), Scottish lawyer and travel writer
- William Robert Wilson (born c. 1940), Australian murderer involved in the 1976 Spring Hill shooting

== Military ==
- Sir William Deane Wilson (1843–1921), British army surgeon-general
- William Wilson (soldier, born 1847) (1847–1895), one of nineteen people to receive the Medal of Honor twice
- William Othello Wilson (1867–1928), member of the US Army's 9th Cavalry, and recipient of the Medal of Honor
- William Tecumseh Wilson (1823–1905), American Union brevet brigadier general from Ohio
- William Wilson (Zouave) (1823–1874), American Union brevet brigadier general from New York
- William Wilson (Bombay Marine officer) (1715–1795), commodore of the East India Company

== Religion ==
- William Wilson (canon of Windsor) (1545–1615)
- William Wilson (Secession minister) (1690–1741), co-founder of the Secession Church
- William Carus Wilson (1791–1859), English churchman and founder and editor of The Children's Friend
- William Wilson (bishop) (1806–1888), Anglican bishop in Scotland
- William Wilson (Dundee minister) (1808–1888) Presbyterian minister, moderator of the Free Church
- William Hay Wilson (1864–1935), Anglican priest
- William C. Wilson (minister) (1866–1915), general superintendent of the Church of the Nazarene
- William Lyall Wilson (1866–1914), minister of the Church of Scotland
- Bill Wilson (pastor) (born 1948), president and founder of Metro Ministries International
- William Wilson (American academic) (born 1958), theologian affiliated with Oral Roberts University
- William Wilson (dean of Cloyne), 1908–1934
- William Croft Wilson (1931–1963), American Congregational minister

== Science ==
- William Wilson (botanist) (1799–1871), English botanist
- William James Erasmus Wilson (1809–1884), physician and surgeon
- William Edward Wilson (astronomer) (1851–1908), Irish astronomer
- William Parkinson Wilson (1826–1874), English astronomer and professor of mathematics
- William Wilson (English academic) (1875–1965), English physicist
- William Wilson (physicist) (1887–1948), English-born physicist
- William Hawkins Wilson (1866–1956), British physiologist
- William L. Wilson (nanoscientist), American scientist

== Others ==
- William "Amos" Wilson (1762–1821), folklore figure of southern Pennsylvania, referred to as "The Pennsylvania Hermit"
- William A. Wilson (folklorist) (1933–2016), studied and taught Mormon folklore
- Bill W. (William Griffith Wilson, 1895–1971), co-founder of Alcoholics Anonymous
- Edward Wilson (explorer) (1872–1912), known as Uncle Bill, Antarctic explorer
- William Wilson (engineer) (1809–1862), English railway pioneer in Germany
- William Chisholm Wilson (1810–1876), newspaper proprietor in Auckland, New Zealand
- William E. Wilson, British railway civil engineer, first employer of John Harry Grainger
- William Julius Wilson (born 1935), sociologist
- William L. Wilson (Rice University), professor of electrical engineering

== In fiction ==
- "William Wilson" (short story), 1839, by Edgar Allan Poe
- "William Wilson" (Boardwalk Empire), an episode of the American television series Boardwalk Empire
- "William Wilson", a song from The Smithereens' 1989 album 11
- Wilson the Wonder Athlete (William Wilson), a character in British story and comic papers published by D.C. Thomson
- Billy Wilson, a character in Angels with Broken Wings
- Agent Bill Wilson, also known as CIA, a character in The Dark Knight Rises

== See also ==
- William Willson (disambiguation)
