= Edict of Nantes =

1598 decree granting religious freedom to Huguenots by Henry IV of France

- Territorial extent: France
- Signed by: Henry IV of France
- Signed: April 1598
- Effective: 25 February 1599 (Paris)
- Repealed: October 1685

Repealed by
- Edict of Fontainbleau

Keywords
- Freedom of religion in France

Text of statute as originally enacted
- Status: Repealed

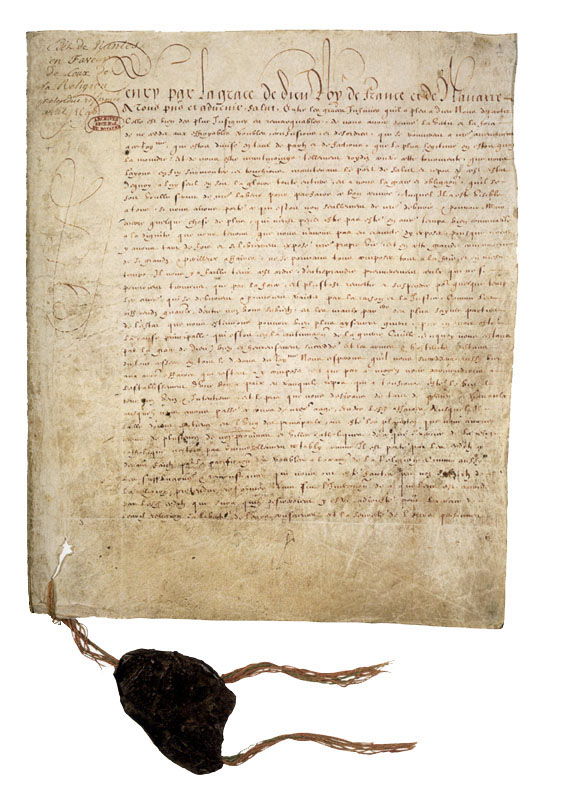
First page of the Edict of Nantes (Archives nationales)

The Edict of Nantes (French: édit de Nantes) was an edict signed on April 18, 1598 by King Henry IV of France that granted the Calvinist Protestants of France, also known as Huguenots, substantial rights in the nation, which was predominantly Catholic. While upholding Catholicism as the established religion, and requiring the re-establishment of Catholic worship in places where it had lapsed, it granted certain religious tolerance to the Protestant Huguenots, who had been waging a long and bloody struggle for their rights in France.

The Edict of Saint-Germain, promulgated 36 years earlier by Catherine de Médici, had granted limited tolerance to Huguenots but was overtaken by events, as it was not formally registered until after the Massacre of Vassy on 1 March 1562, which triggered the first of the French Wars of Religion. The Edict of Nantes helped to end the Wars of Religion in France, which had been raging for decades. It also ensured that the Protestant minority in France would have a measure of religious and political freedom. However, the Edict was eventually revoked by King Louis XIV in 1685, leading to a mass exodus of Huguenots from France.

In this edict, Henry aimed primarily to promote civil unity. (Note: In 1898, the tricentennial celebrated the edict as the foundation of the coming Age of Toleration; the 1998 anniversary, by contrast, was commemorated with a book of essays under the title, Coexister dans l'intolérance (Michel Grandjean and Bernard Roussel, editors, Geneva, 1998).) The edict separated civil from religious unity, treated some Protestants for the first time as more than mere schismatics and heretics and opened a path for secularism and tolerance.

In offering a general freedom of conscience to individuals, the edict offered many specific concessions to the Protestants, such as amnesty and the reinstatement of their civil rights, including the right to work in any field, even for the state, and to bring grievances directly to the king. It successfully marked the end of the French Wars of Religion, which had afflicted France during the second half of the 16th century.

The Edict of Fontainebleau, which revoked the Edict of Nantes in October 1685, was promulgated by Louis XIV, the grandson of Henry IV. This act drove an exodus of Protestants and increased the hostility of Protestant nations bordering France.

== Background ==
The edict aimed primarily to end the longrunning French Wars of Religion. (Note: A detailed chronological account of the negotiations that led to the Edict's promulgation has been offered by Janine Garrisson, L'Édit de Nantes: Chronique d'une paix attendue (Paris: Fayard) 1998.)

King Henry IV also had personal reasons for supporting the edict. Prior to assuming the throne in 1589, he had espoused Protestantism, and he remained sympathetic to the Protestant cause. It was widely believed that he converted to Catholicism in 1593 only to secure his position as king. The edict succeeded in restoring peace and internal unity to France but pleased neither party. Catholics rejected the apparent recognition of Protestantism as a permanent element in French society and still hoped to enforce religious uniformity. Protestants aspired to full parity with Catholics, which the edict did not provide. George A. Rothrock wrote : "Toleration in France was a royal notion, and the religious settlement was dependent upon the continued support of the crown".

Re-establishing royal authority in France required internal peace, which was based on limited toleration enforced by the crown. Since royal troops could not be everywhere, Huguenots needed to be granted strictly-limited possibilities of self-defense.

== Terms ==
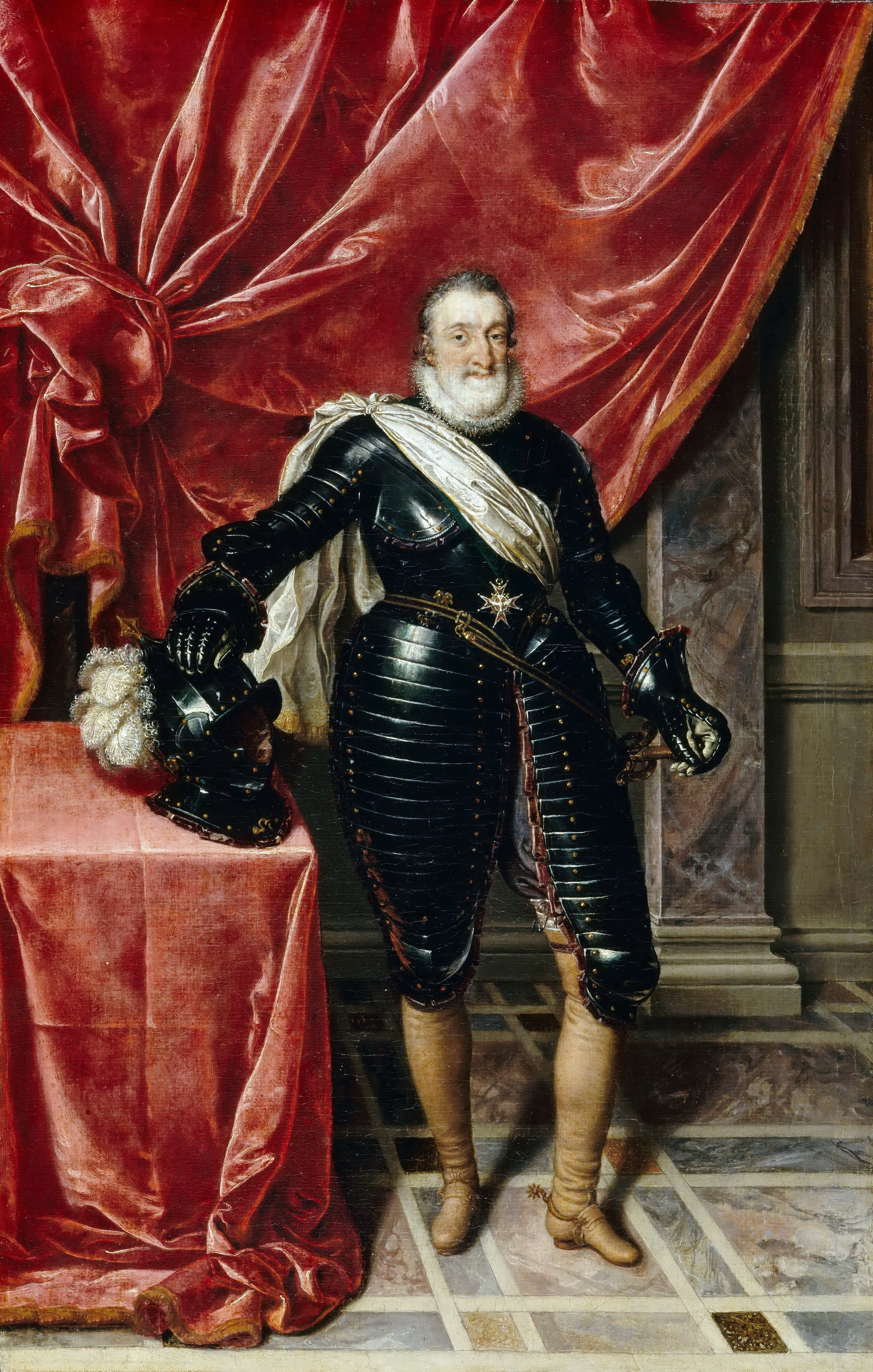
Henry IV of France by Frans Pourbus the younger

The Edict of Nantes that Henry IV signed had four basic texts, including a main text made up of 92 articles that was largely based on unsuccessful peace treaties signed during the recent wars. The edict also included 56 "particular" (secret) articles dealing with Protestant rights and obligations. For example, the French state guaranteed protection of French Protestants travelling abroad from the Inquisition. "This crucifies me", protested Pope Clement VIII upon hearing of the edict. The last two parts consisted of brevets (letters patent), which contained the military clauses and pastoral clauses. Both brevets were withdrawn in 1629 by Louis XIII after a final religious civil war.

The two letters patent supplementing the edict granted the Protestants safe havens (places de sûreté), which were military strongholds such as La Rochelle, in support of which the king paid 180,000 écus a year, along with a further 150 emergency forts (places de refuge), to be maintained at the Huguenots' own expense. Such an act of toleration was unusual in Western Europe, (Note: For Eastern Europe, see Mehmed II's Firman on the Freedom of the Bosnian Franciscans or the Warsaw Confederation.) where standard practice forced subjects to follow the religion of their ruler under the application of the principle of cuius regio, eius religio.

The edict granted religious toleration to the Protestant Huguenots, who had been waging a long and bloody struggle for their rights in France. The main contents were:

- Freedom of conscience and the right to practice their religion (Protestantism) in certain specified towns and cities throughout France.
- The right to hold public office, including the right to serve as judges and administrators, without having to renounce their religion.
- The right to maintain their own schools and universities, and to receive government funding for them.
- The right to fortify their towns and cities for their own protection.
- The right to maintain their own military forces (known as the "Huguenot militia"), which were to be paid for by the French government.
- The right to engage in certain specified trades and professions, including the manufacture and sale of textiles and arms.
- The right to travel freely throughout France, without being subject to searches or seizures of their property.
- The right to bury their dead in their own cemeteries.

The edict also upheld Catholicism's position as the established religion of France. Protestants gained no exemption from paying the tithe (Note: The king agreed to support the Protestant ministers in partial compensation.) and had to respect Catholic holidays and restrictions regarding marriage. The authorities limited Protestant freedom of worship to specified geographic areas. The edict dealt only with Protestant and Catholic coexistence and made no mention of Jews or Muslims, who were offered temporary asylum in France when the Marranos and Moriscos were expelled from Spain. (Note: The ordonnance of 22 February 1610 stipulated that the refugees had to settle north of the Dordogne, safely away from the manipulations of Spanish agents, and that they embrace the Catholic faith; those who did not wish to do so were granted right of passage to French ports on the Mediterranean to take ship for Barbary. By the time the ordonnance was published, Henri IV had been assassinated.)

The original document that promulgated the edict has disappeared. The Archives Nationales in Paris preserves only the text of a shorter document modified by concessions extracted from the King by the clergy and the Parlement of Paris, which delayed ten months before finally signing and setting seals to the document in 1599. A copy of the first edict, sent for safekeeping to the Protestant Geneva, survives. The provincial parlements resisted the edict. The most recalcitrant of them was the Parlement of Rouen, which unreservedly registered the edict only in 1609.

The location of the signing is uncertain. The edict itself stated merely that it was "given at Nantes, in the month of April, in the year of Our Lord one thousand five hundred and ninety-eight". By the late 19th century the Catholic tradition cited the signing in the Maison des Tourelles, the home of the prosperous Spanish trader André Ruiz, which was destroyed by bombing during the Second World War.

== Revocation ==
The Edict remained unaltered in effect, registered by the parlements as "fundamental and irrevocable law", with the exception of the brevets, which had been granted for a period of eight years, and were renewed by Henry in 1606 and in 1611 by Marie de' Medicis, who confirmed the Edict within a week of the assassination of Henry, stilling Protestant fears of another St. Bartholomew's Day massacre. The subsidies had been reduced by degrees, as Henry gained more control of the nation. By the Peace of Montpellier in 1622, concluding a Huguenot revolt in Languedoc, the fortified Protestant towns were reduced to two, La Rochelle and Montauban. The brevets were entirely withdrawn in 1629, by Louis XIII, following the Siege of La Rochelle, in which Cardinal Richelieu blockaded the city for fourteen months.

During the remainder of Louis XIII's reign, and especially during the minority of Louis XIV, the implementation of the Edict varied year by year, voiced in declarations and orders, and in case decisions in the Council, fluctuating according to the tides of domestic politics and the relations of France with powers abroad.

In October 1685, Louis XIV, the grandson of Henry IV, renounced the Edict and declared Protestantism illegal with the Edict of Fontainebleau. This act, commonly called the 'revocation of the Edict of Nantes,' had very damaging results for France. While the wars of religion did not re-ignite, intense persecution of Protestants took place. All Protestant ministers were given two weeks to leave the country unless they converted to Catholicism and all other Protestants were prohibited from leaving the country. In spite of the prohibition, the renewed persecution – including many examples of torture – caused as many as 400,000 to flee France at risk of their lives. Most moved to Great Britain, Prussia, the Dutch Republic, Switzerland, South Africa and the new French colonies and the Thirteen Colonies in North America.

Some moved to Denmark, where the city of Fredericia, laid waste after the Swedish conquest in 1656, needed new settlers and a specific clause in the city ordinance allowed Protestants other than Lutheran to live in the city. This exodus deprived France of many of its most skilled and industrious individuals, some of whom thereafter aided France's rivals in the Netherlands and in England. The revocation of the Edict of Nantes also further damaged the perception of Louis XIV abroad, making the Protestant nations bordering France more hostile to his regime. Upon the revocation of the edict, Frederick William, Elector of Brandenburg issued the Edict of Potsdam, which encouraged Protestants to come to Brandenburg-Prussia.

Freedom to worship and civil rights for non-Catholics in France were not restored until the signing of the Edict of Versailles, also known as the Edict of Tolerance, by Louis XVI 102 years later, on 7 November 1787. This edict was enacted by parlement two months later, less than two years before the end of the Ancien Régime and the Declaration of the Rights of Man and Citizen of 1789 would fully eliminate religious discrimination in France.

== Translation of selected passages ==
These are the principal and most salient provisions of the edict as promulgated in Nantes, Brittany, probably on 30 April 1598:

Henri, by the grace of God king of France and of Navarre, to all to whom these presents come, greeting:

Among the infinite benefits which it has pleased God to heap upon us, the most signal and precious is his granting us the strength and ability to withstand the fearful disorders and troubles which prevailed on our advent in this kingdom. The realm was so torn by innumerable factions and sects that the most legitimate of all the parties was fewest in numbers. God has given us strength to stand out against this storm; we have finally surmounted the waves and made our port of safety,—peace for our state. For which his be the glory all in all, and ours a free recognition of his grace in making use of our instrumentality in the good work.... We implore and await from the Divine Goodness the same protection and favor which he has ever granted to this kingdom from the beginning....

We have, by this perpetual and irrevocable edict, established and proclaimed and do establish and proclaim:

I. First, that the recollection of everything done by one party or the other between March, 1585, and our accession to the crown, and during all the preceding period of troubles, remain obliterated and forgotten, as if no such things had ever happened....

III. We ordain that the Catholic Apostolic and Roman religion shall be restored and reëstablished in all places and localities of this our kingdom and countries subject to our sway, where the exercise of the same has been interrupted, in order that it may be peaceably and freely exercised, without any trouble or hindrance; forbidding very expressly all persons, of whatsoever estate, quality, or condition, from troubling, molesting, or disturbing ecclesiastics in the celebration of divine service, in the enjoyment or collection of tithes, fruits, or revenues of their benefices, and all other rights and dues belonging to them; and that all those who during the troubles have taken possession of churches, houses, goods or revenues, belonging to the said ecclesiastics, shall surrender to them entire possession and peaceable enjoyment of such rights, liberties, and sureties as they had before they were deprived of them....

VI. And in order to leave no occasion for troubles or differences between our subjects, we have permitted, and herewith permit, those of the said religion called Reformed to live and abide in all the cities and places of this our kingdom and countries of our sway, without being annoyed, molested, or compelled to do anything in the matter of religion contrary to their consciences, ... upon condition that they comport themselves in other respects according to that which is contained in this our present edict.

VII. It is permitted to all lords, gentlemen, and other persons making profession of the said religion called Reformed, holding the right of high justice [or a certain feudal tenure], to exercise the said religion in their houses....

IX. We also permit those of the said religion to make and continue the exercise of the same in all villages and places of our dominion where it was established by them and publicly enjoyed several and divers times in the year 1597, up to the end of the month of August, notwithstanding all decrees and judgments to the contrary....

XIII. We very expressly forbid to all those of the said religion its exercise, either in respect to ministry, regulation, discipline, or the public instruction of children, or otherwise, in this our kingdom and lands of our dominion, otherwise than in the places permitted and granted by the present edict.

XIV. It is forbidden as well to perform any function of the said religion in our court or retinue, or in our lands and territories beyond the mountains, or in our city of Paris, or within five leagues of the said city....

XVIII. We also forbid all our subjects, of whatever quality and condition, from carrying off by force or persuasion, against the will of their parents, the children of the said religion, in order to cause them to be baptized or confirmed in the Catholic Apostolic and Roman Church; and the same is forbidden to those of the said religion called Reformed, upon penalty of being punished with especial severity....

XXI. Books concerning the said religion called Reformed may not be printed and publicly sold, except in cities and places where the public exercise of the said religion is permitted.

XXII. We ordain that there shall be no difference or distinction made in respect to the said religion, in receiving pupils to be instructed in universities, colleges, and schools; nor in receiving the sick and poor into hospitals, retreats, and public charities.

== See also ==
- Edict of toleration
- Freedom of religion
- Michel de l'Hôpital, a precursor to Henry IV's policies
- Peace of Vervins
