= Senator Deal =

Senator Deal may refer to:

- Edson Deal (1903–1967), Idaho State Senate
- John Kelsey Deal (1843–1892), Iowa State Senate
- Joseph T. Deal (1860–1942), Virginia State Senate
- Nathan Deal (born 1942), Georgia State Senate
