= Pinky & Pepper Forever =

2018 graphic novel by Eddy Atoms

- Creator: Eddy Atoms
- Date: May 2018
- Main characters: Pinky Cooper; Pepper Parson
- Page count: 70 pages
- Publisher: Silver Sprocket

Original publication
- Language: English
- ISBN: 9781945509223 (1st, paperback)

Pinky & Pepper Forever is a graphic novel created by Eddy Atoms. It debuted at the 2018 Toronto Comic Arts Festival before being widely released on May 30, 2018. Pinky & Pepper Forever follows anthropomorphic dog girlfriends Pinky Cooper and Pepper Parson after the former commits suicide in a performance art piece, after which both of them go to hell. The graphic novel is based on the discontinued Pinkie Cooper and the Jet Set Pets toyline that ran in the early-mid 2010s. Pinky & Pepper Forever was widely praised for its writing, art, and themes.

== Background ==
Pinky & Pepper Forever is based on the discontinued Pinkie Cooper and the Jet Set Pets toyline that ran in the early-mid 2010s. Author Eddy Atoms was inspired to create comics after attending zine fairs, and disregarded traditional rules of illustration while drawing comics. Atoms' first comic work was Clone Void, which Atoms described as "a totally grotesque sci-fi horror that people would probably be repulsed by if I put it out today."

== Story and content ==
Pinky & Pepper Forever follows anthropomorphic dog girlfriends Pinky Cooper and Pepper Parson. After believing Parson refuses to take her artwork seriously, Cooper commits suicide in the fictional performance art piece Final Piece in which she is encased in resin. A distraught Parson loses her will to live, and Cooper and Parson reunite in hell where they endure various tortures and become Grim Reapers. Atoms created the comic's artwork in colored pencil illustrations, sculpture, and Microsoft Paint.

== Reception ==
Following its announcement in January 2018 and debut at that year's Toronto Comic Arts Festival, the graphic novel was positively received by comic critics. The Comics Journal reviewer Carta Monir praised the comic's coloring, writing, themes, and authenticity, observing that "As a lesbian with lots of lesbian artist friends, the relationship depicted in Pinky & Pepper Forever might be the truest representation of a sad, undergraduate, gay art student relationship I’ve ever seen." Monir predicted that Pinky & Pepper Forever would "inspire a generation of artists." The Advocate praised Pinky & Pepper Forever as "a fabulous dark comedy about two lesbian puppy-girls, determined to stay together through art school, death, and hell itself." Autostraddle described the graphic novel as "hilarious" and said, "If you’re a recovering Christian, you will be delighted by [Eddy] Atoms’ dark comic about a devoted girlfriend (Pepper) who follows her dead girlfriend (Pinky) into hell and is shocked to find that she's a superstar in the eternal abyss."

Pinky & Pepper Forever was nominated for the Outstanding Artist award at the 2018 Ignatz Awards. Author Atoms was the winner and featured artist of the Columbus Museum of Art's 2019 Columbus Comics Residency for his work on Pinky & Pepper Forever. The graphic novel's popularity has grown in the years since its debut, with sales of the comic from Silver Sprocket increasing nearly threefold between 2021 and 2022.
