= Eddy Atoms =

American comic book artist and painter

Eddy Atoms, formerly known as Ivy Atoms, is a transgender American comic book artist and painter from San Jose, California known for the cult classic graphic novel Pinky and Pepper Forever.

Eddy Atoms received an Ignatz Award in 2018 for Outstanding Artist for Pinky and Pepper Forever.

== Career ==
Atoms first got inspired to make comics after attending zine fairs. He started to make comics in 2013. His first comic was titled Clone Void, a sci-fi horror. During the same year Atoms started his vendor career.

EROZINE was an erotic comics anthology published in 2014.

Atom’s first known solo exhibition was IDOLGIRLS, hosted at Candy Babel located in Portland, Oregon in 2014.

Through 2015 to 2018, Atoms was an art instructor for Pacific Arts League.

In 2017 Atoms self published Making Comic Zines before it later becoming published by Silver Sprocket in 2019. Atoms other work Emotional Support Animal was also published in 2019 by Diskette Press.

Eddy Atoms debuted with the comic Pinky and Pepper Forever in 2018, which was published under Silver Sprocket.

In 2019, Atoms was a visiting artist lecturer for Columbus College of Art and Design.

Atoms became an art instructor for Bill Wilson Center in 2019 through 2021.

In 2020, Eddy Atoms self published an adult rated comic titled Lampchop.

Dark Night of The Umbreon is a Pokémon fan comic that was self published by Atoms in 2024.

In 2024, Atoms had a solo exhibition titled Boyfriend Asylum at Crisis Club Gallery in Oakland, California
