= Jake Bailey (make-up artist) =

American make-up artist and photographer

- Born: Jacob Bailey; March 16, 1978; Salt Lake City, Utah, U.S.
- Died: October 23, 2015 (aged 37)
- Occupations: Make-up artist, photographer
- Years active: 1996–2015
- Known for: Celebrity make-up
- Relatives: Johanna Bailey (sister)
- Website: jakebailey.com

Jacob Bailey (March 16, 1978 – October 23, 2015) was an American make-up artist and photographer.

== Early life ==
Bailey attended Judge Memorial Catholic High School in Salt Lake City and graduated in 1996.

== Career ==
Growing up in Salt Lake City, Bailey was a performer in numerous theatrical productions and developed an interest in makeup artistry while assisting set artists. He would become assistant to the Salt Lake City Opera's make-up designer and wig master. By the age of 18, Bailey had moved to New York City, where he perfected his technique at makeup counters and through apprenticeships with artists including Kevyn Aucoin and Pat McGrath.

Bailey later collaborated with top photographers in the fashion and entertainment industries including David LaChapelle, Tim Walker, Mark Seliger, Norman Jean Roy and Ellen von Unwerth. Bailey himself would go on to also become a passionate photographer.

Bailey's work appeared in publications including Vogue, Vanity Fair, Allure and Harper's Bazaar. He worked with Katy Perry, Taylor Swift, Ashley Benson, Kate Beckinsale, Selena Gomez, Karlie Kloss and Gwen Stefani, among others.

== Death ==
Bailey died at age 37 from suicide by carbon monoxide poisoning. His death drew tributes from celebrities on his long list of clientele including Paris Hilton, Mariah Carey, Maria Menounos, Octavia Spencer, Katy Perry, Emmy Rossum, and Selena Gomez.
