= Joseph Champlin Stone =

American politician (1829–1902)

Joseph Stone
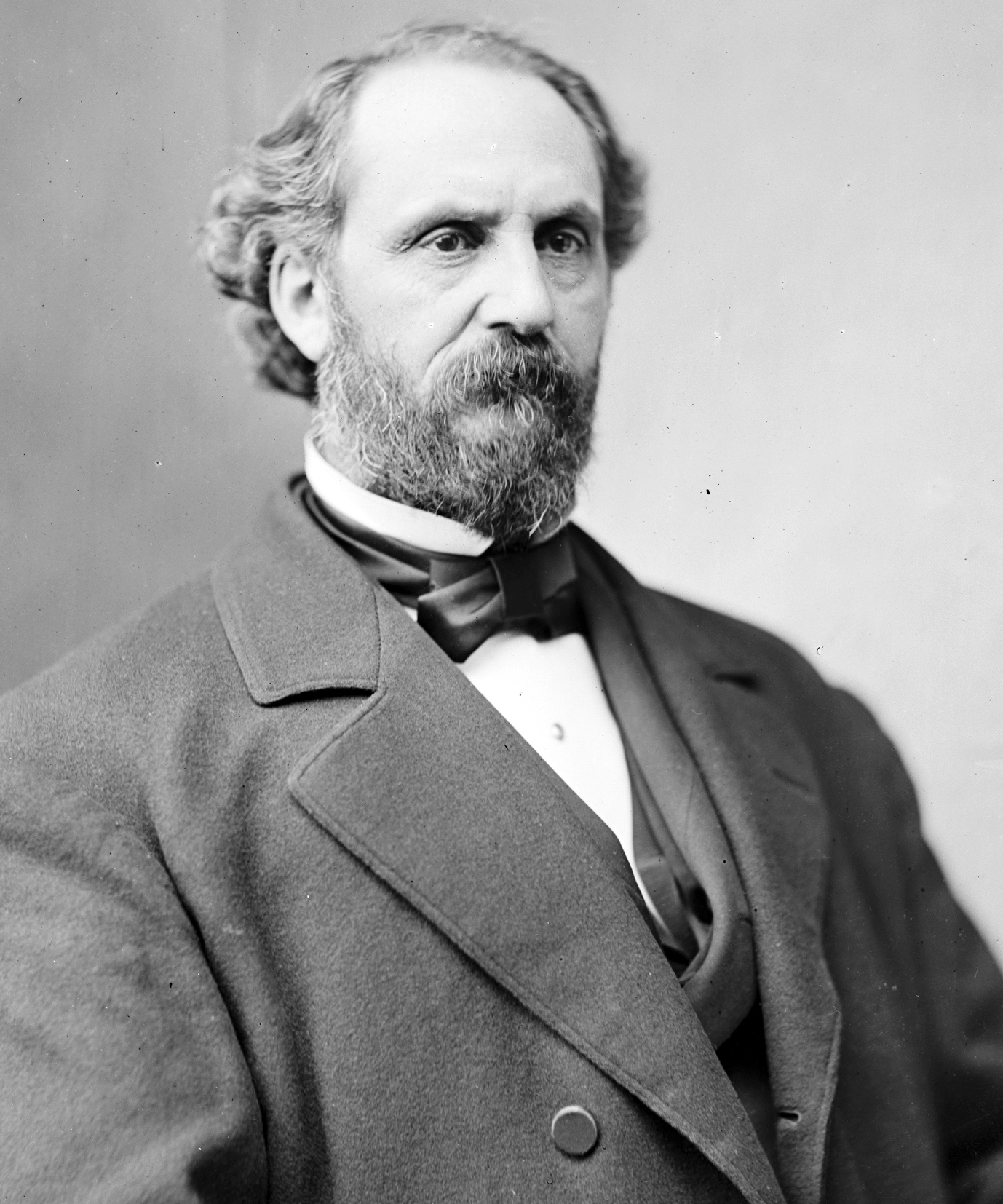

Member of the U.S. House of Representatives from Iowa's 1st district
- In office March 4, 1877 – March 3, 1879
- Preceded by: George W. McCrary
- Succeeded by: Moses A. McCoid

Personal details
- Born: July 30, 1829 Westport, New York, U.S.
- Died: December 3, 1902 (aged 73) Burlington, Iowa, U.S
- Party: Democratic
- Education: Saint Louis University

Military service
- Allegiance: United States of America
- Branch/service: Union Army
- Rank: Captain
- Unit: 1st Iowa Cavalry Regiment
- Battles/wars: American Civil War

Joseph Champlin Stone (July 30, 1829 – December 3, 1902) was a medical doctor and one-term Republican U.S. Representative from Iowa's 1st congressional district.

Born in Westport, New York, Stone moved to Iowa Territory in 1844. He attended the public schools. In 1854, he graduated from the Saint Louis University School of Medicine, in St. Louis, Missouri, and returned to Iowa (now a state) to practice.

During the Civil War Dr. Stone enlisted as a private in the Union Army and was made adjutant of the 1st Regiment Iowa Volunteer Cavalry. He was promoted to captain and assistant adjutant general of volunteers in 1862, and served until the end of the war. He resumed the practice of medicine in Burlington, Iowa.

In 1876, Stone was elected as a Republican to represent Iowa's 1st congressional district in the U.S. House. He served in the Forty-fifth Congress from March 4, 1877 to March 3, 1879. He was a candidate for the Republican nomination in 1878, but finished behind Moses A. McCoid, who succeeded Stone after winning the general election. Returning to Iowa, he again engaged in the practice of his profession.

He died in Burlington on December 3, 1902. He was interred in Aspen Grove Cemetery.

U.S. House of Representatives
| Preceded by George W. McCrary | Member of the U.S. House of Representatives from Iowa's 1st congressional district 1877–1879 | Succeeded by Moses A. McCoid |
