= William Willson =

William Willson may refer to:

- William H. Willson (1805–1856), pioneer of the U.S. state of Oregon
- William Willson (businessman) (1927–2003?), chairman of Aston Martin, 1972–1975
- William Gore Willson (1882–1953), Canadian politician
- William David Willson (1865–1932), political figure in British Columbia

== See also ==
- Robert William Willson, English Roman Catholic bishop
- William Wilson (disambiguation)
