= Judge Memorial Catholic High School =

Location
- 650 South 1100 East; Salt Lake City, Utah 84102; United States; 40°45′18″N 111°51′38″W

Information
- Type: Private, coeducational
- Religious affiliation: Roman Catholic
- Established: 1921
- Grades: 9–12
- Colors: Red and gold
- Mascot: Bulldogs
- Accreditation: WCEA Western Catholic Education Association, Northwest Association of Accredited Schools
- Website: www.judgememorial.com

Judge Memorial Catholic High School is a private Catholic high school located in Salt Lake City, Utah, United States. It is one of three high schools in the Roman Catholic Diocese of Salt Lake City serving students in grades nine through 12. Founded in 1921, the school draws students from across the Salt Lake Valley and beyond. Judge Memorial shares its city location with Our Lady of Lourdes parish and school.

== History ==
The school property was originally the John Judge Memorial Miner's Home, a hospital established by Mary Judge, wife of John Judge, a partner of US Senator Thomas Kearns in Park City's famous Silver King Mining Co. Kearns married Judge's niece, Jennie Judge. Judge Mercy Home, more commonly called Judge Miner's Home, was designed by architect David C. Dart. The hospital was established for the population of Catholic coal miners working in Park City who suffered from black lung. As the need for a hospital dedicated to this cause subsided in direct relation to the decline of coal mining east of Salt Lake, Mary Judge (who along with her deceased husband, John, was the benefactor of the hospital) expressed her wishes to the bishop of the Diocese of Salt Lake to reopen the medical facility as a school. Mary Judge died before the diocese opened the new school's doors. The cornerstone was laid by Bishop Lawrence Scanlan in the fall of 1902 but the hospital was not opened until the fall of 1910. The hospital was originally intended to provide medical treatment for aged and infirm miners. Many miners working in Park City suffered from silicosis, also known as "miners' consumption", the disease that killed Mary's husband John at the age of 48. With Holy Cross Hospital a few blocks away, the need for a miners' hospital was not great; it was remodeled and opened as a school in the fall of 1920, under the name "Cathedral School."

Until 1929 the school was known as Cathedral High School and Catholic Grammar School. Bishop John Joseph Mitty changed the name to Judge Memorial School in 1929. In the fall of 1960, Judge moved into a new school building, and the old building was used as an elementary school until it was torn down in 1966. Judge Memorial was co-educational until 1964. That fall, Bishop Joseph Lennox Federal brought in the Oblates of St. Francis de Sales to run it as an all-boys school. At this time, girls attended St. Mary of the Wasatch High School. In 1970, St. Mary closed and girls once again joined the boys at Judge. That same year, the school added the word "Catholic" to its name.

== Awards ==
Judge Memorial Catholic High School was designated a National Blue Ribbon School in 1984, 1989, 1998, and 2021, and is the only high school in Utah to receive this award more than once.

The school was included on the Challenge Index, which identified it as one of the top schools in the United States in 2020.

== Demographics ==
Enrollment by grade (2017-2018)
Grade 9	Grade 10	Grade 11	Grade 12
180	180	180	180

Enrollment by race/ethnicity (2017-2018)
Asian	Black	Hispanic	White	Native Hawaiian/ Pacific Islander
30	30	200	455	5

== Notable alumni ==
Business and communications

- Whitney Wolfe Herd, entrepreneur, co-founder of Tinder, founder and CEO at Bumble
- Philip J. Purcell, former CEO of Morgan Stanley

Government and community leadership

- Carolyn B. McHugh, American judge
- Art Kimball, former Utah State Senator
- Ted Vogt, former Arizona State Representative
- Robert Joseph Dwyer, former Catholic Archbishop of Portland and Utah historian

Athletics

- Kaden Elliss, NFL linebacker
- Keenyn Walker, MLB outfielder
- Zach Lund, Olympic athlete (skeleton luge)
- Patrick Smyth (athlete), American long-distance runner
- Luke Puskedra, American long-distance runner
- John Fassel - NFL coach

Music, film, and fine arts

- Stevie Nicks, singer, songwriter, and Grammy Award winner
- Maddie Rice, guitarist
- Pete Oswald, illustrator and production designer
- Jake Bailey, make-up artist
- Becca Bernstein, artist
- Joseph Bottum, writer
- John Fulton, author
- James Merendino, filmmaker
Lisa Remington, filmmaker

== In film ==
Scenes from the movie Deidra & Laney Rob a Train were filmed in 2016 at Judge Memorial Catholic High School.

== See also ==
- List of high schools in Utah
- Judge Building (Salt Lake City, Utah)
