= Keenyn Walker =

American baseball player (born 1990)

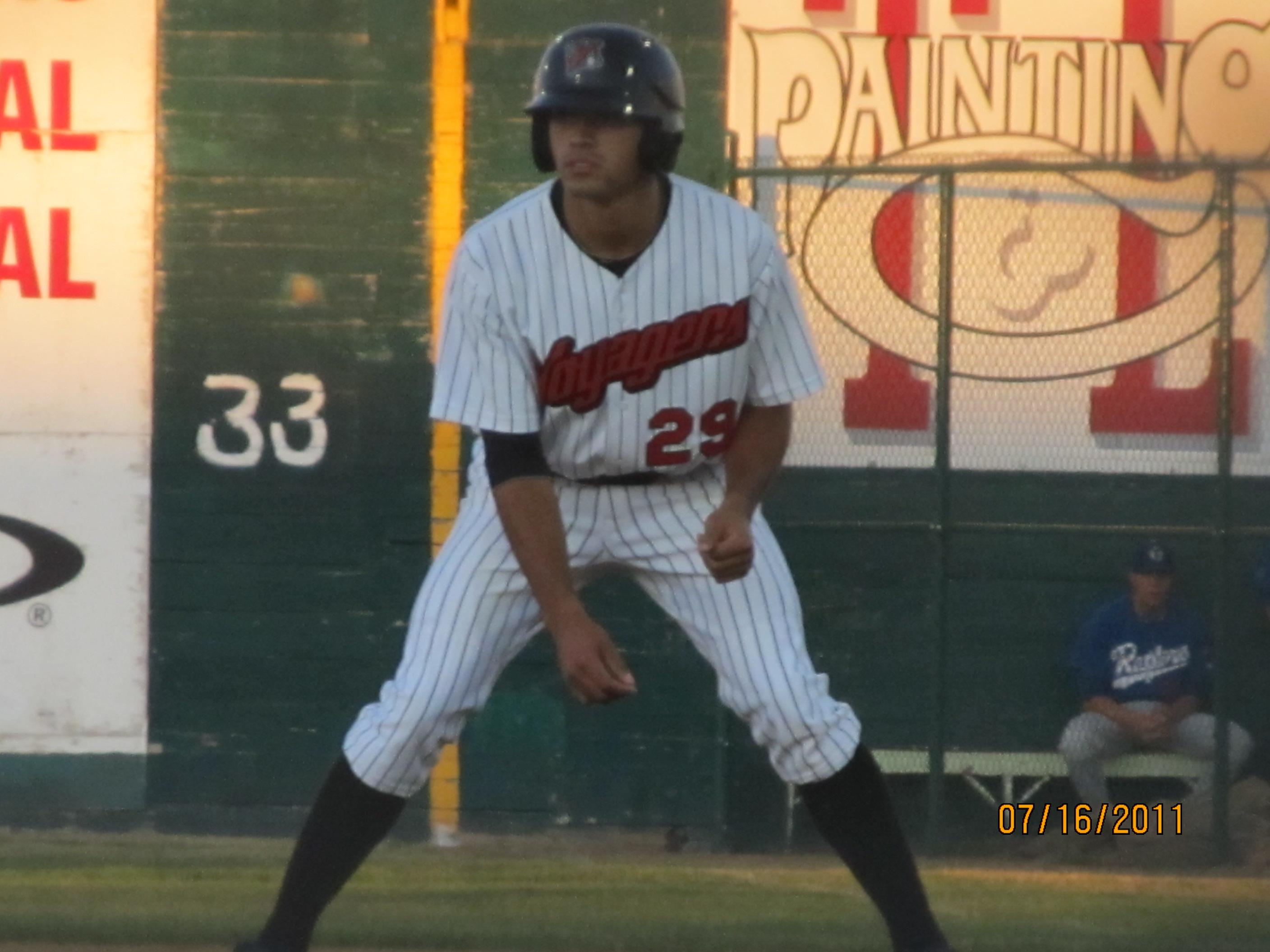
- Outfielder
- Born: August 12, 1990 (age 35); Salt Lake City, Utah, U.S.
- Bats: Both Throws: Right
- Stats at Baseball Reference

Keenyn Tyler Walker (born August 12, 1990 in Salt Lake City, Utah) is an American former professional baseball outfielder.

== Career ==
=== Chicago White Sox ===
Walker was drafted by the Chicago Cubs in the 16th round of the 2009 Major League Baseball draft, after attending Judge Memorial Catholic High School but did not sign. Walker was drafted again this time by the Philadelphia Phillies in the 38th round of the 2010 Major League Baseball draft but did not sign. He attended Central Arizona College. Walker was drafted for the third year in a row, by the Chicago White Sox in the first round (47th overall) of the 2011 Major League Baseball draft. Walker started his baseball career in 2011 at the Rookie level with the Great Falls Voyagers and then was promoted to Single-A Kannapolis Intimidators. In 2011 combined, Walker hit .257 in 222 at-bats with no home runs, 24 RBI, and 21 stolen bases. In 2012, Walker started the year at Kannapolis but was later promoted to High-A Winston-Salem Dash. In 2012 combined, Walker hit .267 in 409 at-bats with four home runs, 55 RBI, and 56 stolen bases. Before the 2013 season, Walker was ranked the White Sox #8 prospect. Walker was promoted to Double-A Birmingham Barons before the start of the 2013 season. Walker spent the entire season in Birmingham and he batted .201 in 462 at bats with three home runs, 32 RBI, and 38 stolen bases. Walker split the 2014 and 2015 seasons between the advanced Single-A Winston-Salem Dash and Double-A Birmingham Barons, slashing .197/.277/.265 between the two in 2014, and .226/.308/.286 in 2015. Walker spent the entirety of 2016 in Birmingham, hitting .240/.330/.340 with three home runs and 28 RBI in 329 at-bats. Walker was released by the White Sox on April 4, 2017.

=== Windy City ThunderBolts ===
On April 28, 2017, Walker signed with the Windy City ThunderBolts of the Frontier League. On the season, Walker hit .225/.316/.342 with 6 home runs and 31 RBI in 95 games with the ThunderBolts.

=== Lancaster Barnstormers ===
On February 1, 2018, Walker signed with the Lancaster Barnstormers of the Atlantic League of Professional Baseball. He was released on June 1, after hitting .182/.289/.242 with no home runs and three RBI in 14 games.

Walker has since retired from professional baseball and is currently a trainer, coach, and EMT.
