= Judge Building (Salt Lake City) =

Historic building in Salt Lake City, Utah, U.S.

- U.S. National Register of Historic Places
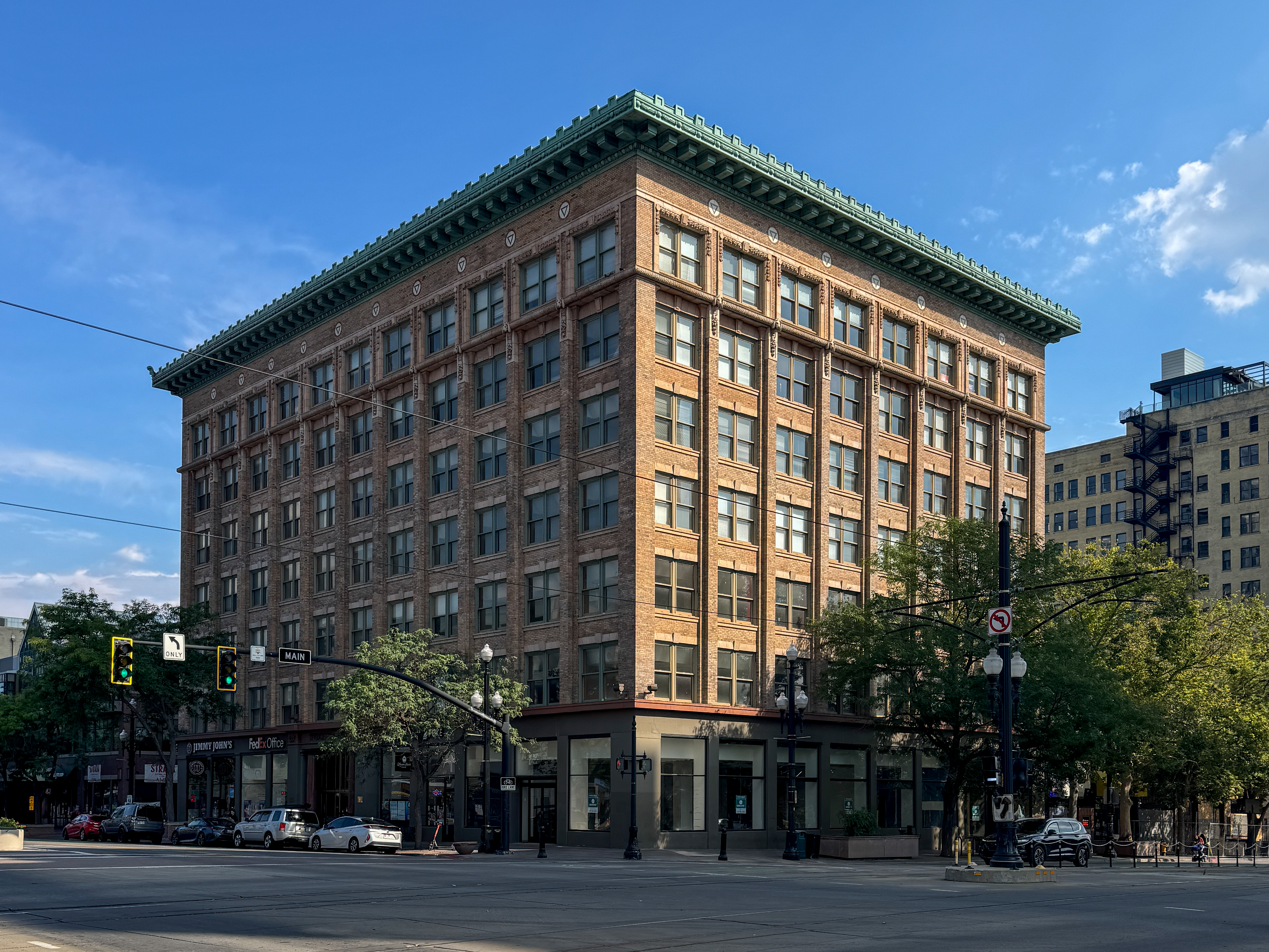
- Judge Building, August 2025

- Location within Utah Location within the United States
- Location: 8 East 300 South; Salt Lake City, Utah; United States
- Coordinates: 40°45′46″N 111°53′24″W
- Area: less than one acre
- Built: 1907
- Architect: Dart, David C.
- Architectural style: Early Commercial
- NRHP reference No.: 79002502
- Added to NRHP: December 26, 1979

The Judge Building (also known as the Railway Exchange Building), is a historic commercial building in Salt Lake City, Utah, United States, that is listed on the National Register of Historic Places (NRHP).

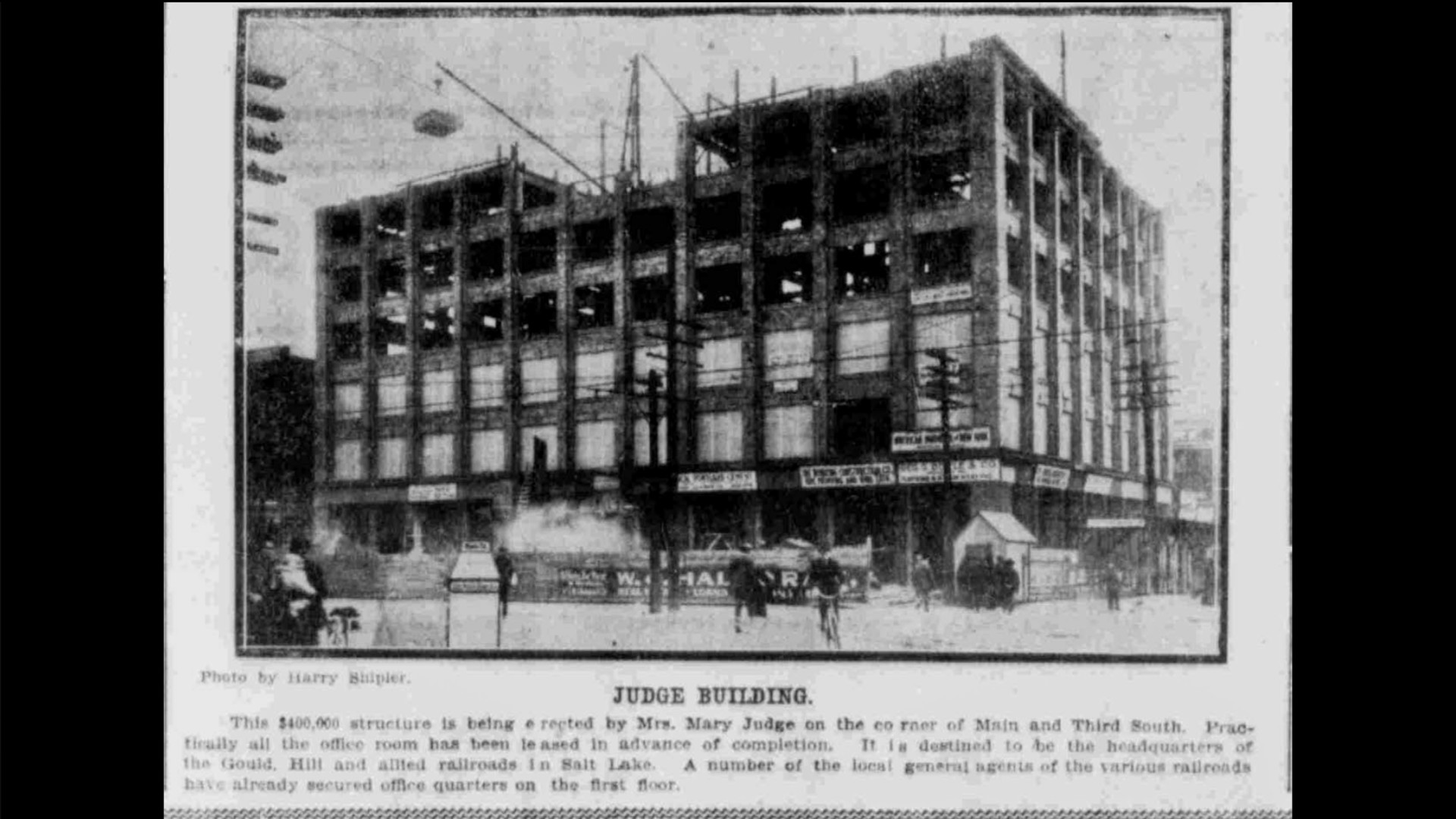
The Judge Building during construction, December 1907

== Description ==
The 7-story commercial office building was designed by David C. Dent and constructed for Mary Judge in 1907. The facade features masonry piers capped by terracotta floral designs and canine heads segmenting a sixth floor lintel. Circles with inverted triangles decorate the parapet below a copper, denticulated cornice. The Judge Building was added to the National Register of Historic Places in 1979.

Seven railway companies leased space in the building prior to its completion, and the number later increased to 22 railway companies. When the building opened in 1908, almost all office space already was rented.

The Bombing:

In October 1985, stockbroker, Steven Christensen, 31 years old, had just arrived at his office in the Judge Building shortly after 8 A.M. when a box bearing his name and lying in a corridor exploded, killing him instantly, the police said. This incident was featured in the 2021 Netflix documentary series Murder Among the Mormons.

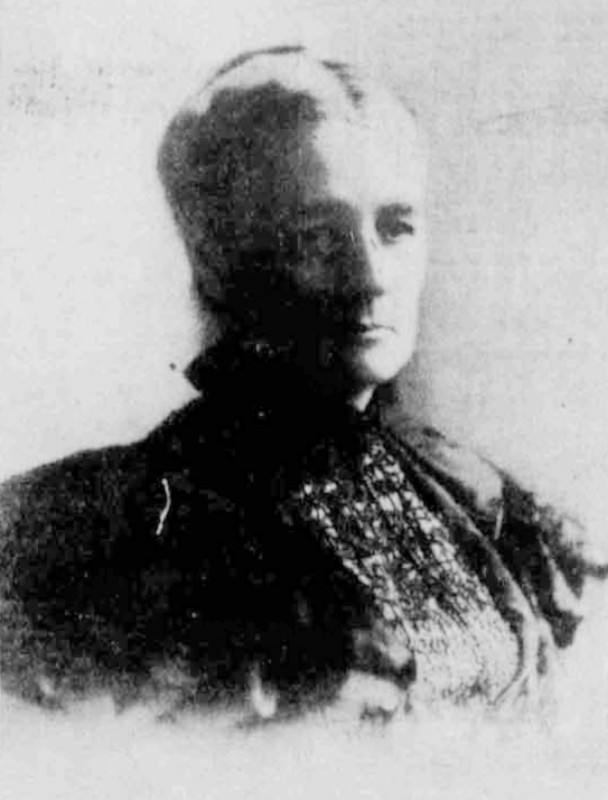
Mary Judge, December 1908

== Mary Judge ==
Mary (Harney) Judge (April 19, 1841 – November 8, 1909) was a real estate and mining investor based in Salt Lake City. Her husband, John Judge, had been a wealthy investor in the Daly Mine in Park City, later incorporated as Utah's Silver King Mine. After her husband's death in 1892, Mary judge became well known in business and in philanthropy.

== See also ==
- National Register of Historic Places listings in Salt Lake City
- Judge Memorial Catholic High School
