= John Shane =

American politician, judge, and military officer

Judge of the Eighth Judicial District of Iowa
- In office 1876–1882
- Preceded by: James H. Rothrock

Member of the Iowa Senate
- In office 1872–1876
- Succeeded by: John David Nichols (District 28) William Harrison Gallup (District 33)

Personal details
- Born: May 26, 1822 Jefferson County, Ohio, U.S.
- Died: September 18, 1899 (aged 77) Vinton, Iowa, U.S.
- Party: Republican
- Education: Washington & Jefferson College
- Profession: Politician, Judge, Military Officer

Military service
- Branch/service: Union Army
- Years of service: 1861–1865
- Rank: Colonel
- Unit: 13th Iowa Infantry Regiment
- Battles/wars: Battle of Shiloh; Atlanta campaign

John Shane (May 26, 1822 – September 18, 1899) was an American politician, judge, and military officer.

== Early life and education ==
John Shane was born on May 26, 1822, in Jefferson County, Ohio. He graduated from Washington & Jefferson College in Pennsylvania and studied law under Edwin M. Stanton.

== Career ==
In 1856, Shane settled in Vinton, Iowa, where he established the law firm Alexander, Shane & McCartney. With the outbreak of the American Civil War, Shane enlisted in Company G of the 13th Iowa Infantry Regiment. He participated in significant battles, including the Battle of Shiloh and the Atlanta campaign. Shane began his military career as a captain and was promoted to colonel, succeeding Marcellus M. Crocker when Crocker was promoted to brigadier general.

After the war, Shane returned to Vinton to resume his law practice. He was elected to the Iowa Senate as a Republican from District 33 in 1871. He was re-elected in 1875 and redistricted to District 28 before the 1877 election. However, he chose to accept an 1876 gubernatorial nomination to serve as a judge for the Eighth Judicial District of Iowa, succeeding James H. Rothrock, who had been elevated to the Iowa Supreme Court.

Shane was elected to a full term as a judge in 1878. He resigned from the position in 1882 due to paralysis.

== Death ==
John Shane died on September 18, 1899, in Vinton, Iowa.
