= John Kelsey Deal =

American politician

John Kelsey Deal (31 December 1843 – 23 May 1892) was an American educator and politician.

John Kelsey Deal was born in Groveland, New York, on 31 December 1843. When Deal was fifteen, his family moved to Allen County, Indiana, where they farmed, and his father George later died. Deal enlisted with Company C of the 88th Indiana Infantry Regiment in July 1862, after the American Civil War began. He left active service within two years, and, after attending Fort Wayne College, became a teacher.

Deal moved to Carroll County, Iowa, in 1867 and was elected superintendent of schools for the county later that year. When it was decided that county records originally kept in Carrollton would be moved to Carroll, Deal became one of the first residents of the new town, in 1868. In his two-year superintendency, Deal led the county's inaugural teachers' institute. He was elected clerk of court in 1868, and vacated the superintendency in 1869. Upon the end of his four-year term as court clerk, Deal established a banking and real estate firm Griffith & Deal. Following a fire in 1879, Deal divested from banking and focused on real estate. He ran in the 1885 Iowa Senate election as a Republican candidate, and won the District 48 seat. Deal completed his only term on the Iowa Senate in 1890, and died on 23 May 1892.
