= Billy Wilson (footballer, born 1896) =

English footballer

Personal information
- Full name: William Arthur Wilson
- Date of birth: 17 March 1896
- Place of birth: Newcastle upon Tyne, England
- Date of death: 1996 (aged 99–100)
- Position: Right half

Senior career*
Years	Team	Apps	(Gls)
1913–1922	Newcastle United	0	(0)
1922	Merthyr Town	2	(0)
- West Stanley
- Carlisle United
- * Club domestic league appearances and goals

William Arthur Wilson (17 March 1896 – 1996) was an English professional footballer, who played in the Football League for Merthyr Town as a right half.

== Personal life ==
Wilson served as a chief petty officer in the Royal Navy during the First World War. He served at HMS Vivid II in Devonport.
