= Pinkie Cooper =

Fashion doll line

Pinkie Cooper and the Jet Set Pets
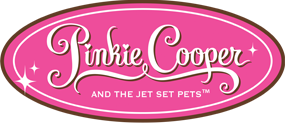
- Type: Fashion doll
- Invented by: Carter Bryant
- Company: The Bridge Direct
- Country: United States
- Availability: 2013–2014
- Slogan: "Their world is their runway!"

Pinkie Cooper and the Jet Set Pets was a short-lived line of fashion dolls developed and manufactured by The Bridge Direct that arrived in major US and international retailers in summer and fall of 2013. The line includes aspects of fashion play, travel, and pet collectibles.

== Dolls ==
The dolls are approximately nine inches tall and are modeled after the English Toy Spaniel dog breed. The line was designed by fashion and toy designer Carter Bryant, creator of the original Bratz concept, and his sister. Bryant said that he based the dolls on his sister's real Cocker Spaniel of the same name, Pinkie Cooper.

== Characters ==
- Pinkie Cooper - the title character. She is obsessed with fashion. She is also the founder of the Pinkie Post website, and her favorite fashion capitol is New York City. Pinkie's fashion sense is elegant and uptown with a touch of the unexpected. Her design skill is making any found object into jewelry, and her fashion mantra is "Dress to Express!". She is from St. Louis, Missouri. Her signature color is pink.
- Ginger Jones - one of Pinkie's best friends. She is a creative expert designer. She dreams of having her own fashion collection. Ginger's fashion sense is ultra-girly with many dainty touches, her design skill is creating a successful outfit on short notice, and her fashion mantra is "A smile is the best accessory!". She is from Los Angeles, California. Her signature color is purple.
- Pepper Parson - one of Pinkie's best friends. She is a well-known DJ and knowledgeable music lover. She believes life is an adventure and likes trying new things. Pepper's fashion sense is off-beat with eclectic combinations and ethnic touches. Her special skill is setting up the optimal playlist for any occasion, and her fashion mantra is "Don't be afraid to break the rules!". She is from New York City. Her signature color is blue.
- Lil' Pinkie - Pinkie's puppy. She loves to be groomed, prefers to retain her beauty, and has perfect poise. She is also able to sense any fashion faux pas.
- Sprinkles - Ginger's puppy. She loves to be pampered, can be a bit spoiled, and believes in being fashion-forward. She can also read Ginger's mind.
- Saltine - Pepper's puppy. She was found at an animal rescue shelter. She is red carpet-bound and a showstopper, though she also enjoys getting dirty.

== Products ==
=== Travel Collection ===
- London Pinkie
- Paris Pinkie
- Beverly Hills Pinkie

=== Runway Dolls ===
- Pinkie Cooper
- Ginger Jones
- Pepper Parson

These are the first dolls to feature Ginger Jones and Pepper Parson.

=== Jet Set Pets ===
- Lil' Pinkie
- Sprinkles
- Saltine

These products match the 'Night Out' fashion packs (See below)

=== Fashion Packs (Night Out) ===
- Vintage (Pinkie Cooper)
- Dance Recital Gala (Ginger Jones)
- Benefit Gala (Pepper Parson)

=== Jet Setting Case ===
Looks like a suitcase, it holds:

- 2 dolls (Pinkie Cooper and Pepper Parson)
- 2 dogs
- Three to four sets of shoes
- Passport and brush
- Two or three sets of wigs
- Four purses
- One to two dresses

== Official website ==
The official website was launched in July 2013. It featured character profiles, games, downloadable crafts with wallpapers, videos and webisodes, merchandise list, and a blog named Pinkie Post.

== Webisodes ==
Title	Episode	Air date
"A Three Piece Outfit"	1	July 15, 2013
"Party Troopers"	2	August 30, 2013
"A Dress to Impress"	3	September 6, 2013
"Fortunately Unfortunately"	4	September 20, 2013
"Diamond in the Ruff"	5	October 18, 2013
"Oh, Rio-ly"	6	November 18, 2013
"Runaway Runway"	7	December 6, 2013

== Legacy ==
Pinkie Cooper and the Jet Set Pets is the basis for Eddy Atoms' 2018 graphic novel Pinky & Pepper Forever.
