= Thomas R. Gilmore =

American politician (1825–1899)

Thomas R. Gilmore (30 April 1825 – 9 January 1899) was an American politician.

Francis Gilmore and Sarah McBride immigrated from County Cavan to Harrison County, Ohio, where their son Thomas R. Gilmore was born on 30 April 1825. He was educated in New Athens, Ohio, and later attended Jefferson College, graduating in 1846. He then worked as a teacher, and later became a farmer. While an Ohio resident, Gilmore married his first wife, Catherine Milligan, in November 1854. She died in June 1855. Thomas and his brother Samuel moved to Mahaska County, Iowa, in 1858. Following the death of his first wife, Gilmore married the Irish-born Ellen Steele in 1860.

After James Addison Young had died in office, Gilmore was elected to the Iowa Senate for District 18 as a Republican for the first time in 1875. By 1877, Gilmore had been redistricted to District 15. Gilmore died on 9 January 1899.
