= Art Kimball =

American politician

Arthur Lionel Kimball III (August 19, 1941 - April 8, 2014) was an American politician.

Born in Missoula, Montana, Kimball grew up in Evanston, Wyoming and Salt Lake City, Utah. Kimball graduated from Judge Memorial Catholic High School and went to the University of Utah. He then served in the United States Army in 1960. Kimball was involved with the White City, Utah community council. He then served in the Utah State Senate from 1977 to 1982 as a Democrat.
