= James H. Rothrock =

Iowa Supreme Court Chief Justice (1829–1899)

James Rothrock

Chief Justice of the Iowa Supreme Court
- In office February 28, 1889 – 1891
- Preceded by: Joseph Rea Reed

Justice of the Iowa Supreme Court
- In office February 24, 1876 – December 31, 1896

Judicial District Judge
- In office 1866–1875

Personal details
- Born: June 1, 1829 Milroy, Pennsylvania, U.S.
- Died: January 14, 1899 (aged 69) Cedar Rapids, Iowa, U.S.
- Party: Republican

Military service
- Branch/service: Union Army
- Years of service: 1861
- Rank: Colonel
- Unit: 35th Iowa Infantry Regiment
- Battles/wars: Civil War

James Harvey Rothrock (June 1, 1829 – January 14, 1899) was an American judge and politician.

== Early life ==
A native of Milroy, Pennsylvania, born on June 1, 1829, he and his family moved to Ohio in 1838, where they farmed. As a child, Rothrock only attended school during the winters. When he turned eighteen, he enrolled in school at New Richmond, and was later accepted to Franklin University. When university classes were not in session, Rothrock worked as a schoolteacher.

== Legal career ==
In 1852, he left Franklin, opting to read law in West Union. Two years later, Rothrock passed the Columbus bar. He served a single term as prosecutor for Highland County before moving to Iowa in 1860.

== Political career ==
Rothrock settled in Tipton, Iowa, in 1860. By the fall of 1861, he had been elected to the Iowa House of Representatives. He served as a Republican legislator for District 33. After Rush Clark vacated the speakership for health reasons, Rothrock was elected speaker pro-term. Upon completing his only term as a state representative, Samuel J. Kirkwood offered Rothrock the rank of colonel in the 35th Iowa Infantry Regiment. He refused the rank, but did serve with the regiment during the Siege of Vicksburg. Rothrock caught typhoid fever during the engagement, and after recovering, returned to the practice of law in Iowa alongside W. P. Wolf.

== Judicial career ==
Rothrock was appointed to the eighth district court judgeship in 1866 and succeeded by John Shane upon his elevation as a justice of the Iowa Supreme Court from February 24, 1876, to December 31, 1896, appointed from Cedar County, Iowa. Rothrock refused a nomination for a second term on the Iowa Supreme Court. He died on January 14, 1899.

Political offices
Preceded by	Justice of the Iowa Supreme Court; 1876–1896	Succeeded by
