= Joshua Miller (Iowa politician) =

American politician (1822–1886)

Joshua Miller (21 December 1822 – 10 September 1886) was an American politician.

Miller was born in Columbiana County, Ohio to parents John J. Miller and Elizabeth Koontz. Both parents were from Pennsylvania and of German descent. They settled in Ohio prior to the birth of Joshua Miller on 21 December 1822. Aged 12, Miller left for Louisville, Kentucky, where he began working as a carpenter. Within five years, Miller had relocated to Lawrence County, Indiana. He continued carpentry work in Indiana for six years. Miller subsequently lived in the Missouri Ozarks for one year, then moved into St. Louis. He settled in Farmington, Iowa, by 1846, then moved to Appanoose County.

In 1844, while a resident of Indiana, Miller joined the Methodist Episcopal Church and married Rhoda A. Swindler. From 1844 to 1855, he intermittently studied law, and subsequently passed the bar in Centerville in 1856. Wilson was active in the Whig Party until its dissolution, and helped found the Appanoose County Republican Party. He was elected to a two-year term as justice of the peace in 1856. He contested the 1875 Iowa Senate election for District 4 as a Republican, and was elected. By the 1877 election, Miller was redistricted to District 3. He died on 10 September 1886 in Centerville.
