= Benton Jay Hall =

American politician

Benton Hall
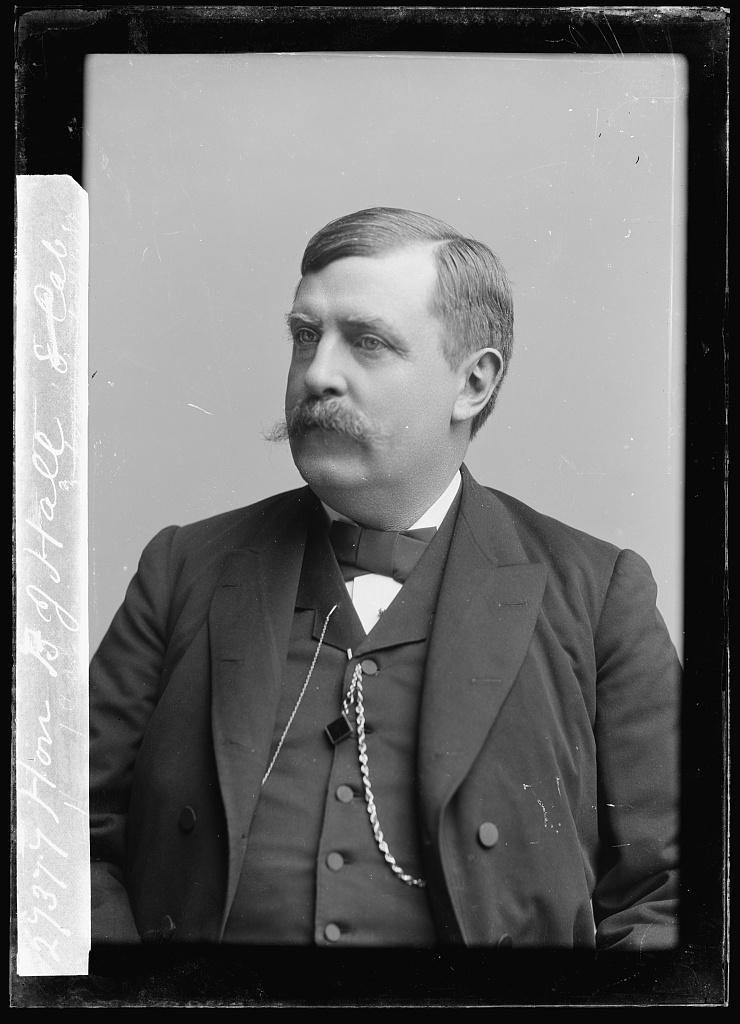

Member of the U.S. House of Representatives from Iowa's 1st district
- In office March 4, 1885 – March 3, 1887
- Preceded by: Moses A. McCoid
- Succeeded by: John H. Gear

Member of the Iowa Senate from the 9th district
- In office January 9, 1882 – March 3, 1885
- Preceded by: John Patterson
- Succeeded by: William Dodge

Member of the Iowa House of Representatives from the 2nd district
- In office January 8, 1872 – January 11, 1874
- Preceded by: multi-member district
- Succeeded by: multi-member district

Personal details
- Born: January 13, 1835 Mount Vernon, Ohio, U.S.
- Died: January 5, 1894 (aged 58) Burlington, Iowa, U.S
- Party: Democratic
- Education: Miami University

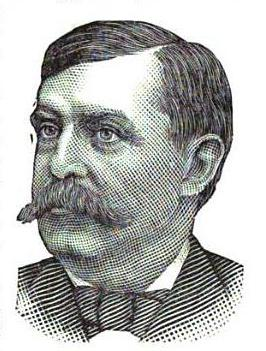
From 1888's The Biographical Review of Prominent Men & Women of the Day

Benton Jay "Ben" Hall (January 13, 1835 – January 5, 1894) was a one-term Democratic U.S. Representative from Iowa's 1st congressional district in southeastern Iowa.

Born in Mount Vernon, Ohio, Hall moved in December 1840 with his parents (future Iowa Supreme Court justice J.C. Hall and his wife) to Burlington in Iowa Territory. He attended Knox College, Galesburg, Illinois, and graduated from Miami University, Oxford, Ohio, in 1855. He studied law with his father, was admitted to the bar in 1857 and practiced in Burlington. He was a member of the Iowa House of Representatives in 1872 and 1873. In 1873 he was an unsuccessful candidate for election to the Iowa Supreme Court. He was elected to a four-year term in the Iowa Senate in 1881.

The following year (1882) Hall won the democratic nomination for election to represent Iowa's 1st congressional district in the U.S. House, but was defeated by the incumbent Republican, Moses A. McCoid. However, in 1884, Hall ran again for the 1st district seat and prevailed, the first Democrat to take that seat since the outbreak of the Civil War. He served in the Forty-ninth Congress. However, in 1886 he was defeated in the general election by former Iowa Governor (and future U.S. Senator) John H. Gear. Hall served in Congress from March 4, 1885 to March 3, 1887.

Soon after his defeat, he was appointed Commissioner of Patents by President Cleveland and served from April 12, 1887, to March 31, 1889, and afterward resumed the practice of law.

He died in Burlington on January 5, 1894. He was interred in Aspen Grove Cemetery.

U.S. House of Representatives
Preceded by Moses A. McCoid	Member of the U.S. House of Representatives from Iowa's 1st congressional district 1885–1887	Succeeded by John H. Gear
