= William M. Wilson (politician) =

American politician (1838–1904)

William M. Wilson (23 April 1838 – 30 April 1904) was an American politician.

William M. Wilson was born near Greensborough, North Carolina, on 23 April 1838 to parents R. D. Wilson and Ruhama Spoon. The family settled in Mahaska County, Iowa, in 1853, where Wilson attended primary school. He enrolled at Oskaloosa High School in 1857. His family moved near New Virginia in 1860, and Wilson joined them there the next year, as the American Civil War began. Wilson served in Missouri during the conflict, alongside Company D of the First Iowa Cavalry. He was discharged in September 1864 and married Martha Fleming in February 1865. From 1865 to 1867, Wilson was a farmer and sawmill operator. Wilson then focused on reading law with Conklin and Chancy in Osceola. He subsequently passed the Indianola bar in 1869 and began his legal career in Osceola. Wilson was licensed to practice law before the Iowa Supreme Court by 1872.

Wilson was a Republican. In 1875, he was elected mayor of Osceola. He contested the 1879 Iowa Senate election, and won election to the body as a representative of District 5. In 1882, Wilson was named to a commission convened by the United States Department of the Interior to decide on a location for a post office in Council Bluffs. After stepping down from the Iowa Senate, Wilson remained active with the Iowa National Guard, as first lieutenant of Company A. In December 1885, Wilson was elevated to major and judge advocate. He later moved to Washington, D.C. to work in the federal government, which included a presidential appointment by Benjamin Harrison to serve within the Department of the Interior.

Wilson was a Methodist and Freemason. He died on 30 April 1904, while visiting his daughter in Perry, Iowa.
