= Bill Wilson Center =

Program for homeless and runaway youth in California

The Bill Wilson Center (BWC) is a nonprofit organization in Santa Clara, California, that provides support to homeless and runaway children and young adults.

== History ==
=== Early history ===
It was founded in 1973 by Bill Wilson, who was a Santa Clara councilman and mayor from 1963 to 1971. Wilson assisted in founding a counseling center for children at Buchser Middle School. Initially called Webster's Education Center when the institutors were attempting to determine the organization's name, it was renamed to the Bill Wilson Center after his unexpected death in 1977 in his early 40s. In 1977, the center obtained a house that acted as a shelter for at most six homeless youth.

The Bill Wilson Center's director is Sparky Harlan. She joined the organization as its director in 1983. When she joined, the organization faced an imminent loss of 50% of its annual $300,000 budget; she was able to prevent the budget cut. In July 1993, she moved the center to The Alameda in Santa Clara, which unified its shelter and counseling center to be in the same location. The move also expanded its capacity from being able to house at most 16 homeless children, up from six. In 2012, the White House Office of Public Engagement and Intergovernmental Affairs named Harlan a Champion of Change, an award given to people who help homeless children.

According to the San Jose Mercury News, the Bill Wilson Center was the first organization in the Santa Clara Valley to "provide comprehensive services -- including transitional housing -- for this often-invisible population" of homeless youth. The organization receives most of its funding from government grants. Since it is uncertain whether the funds will be maintained or augmented to address the children's growing needs, the Bill Wilson Center solicits donations from people and corporations.

=== 2000s ===
In 2012, the Bill Wilson Center finished developing Peacock Commons, a two-story, 28-unit housing complex for homeless young adults between 18 and 25. It bought the complex in 2007 and began renovating it in February 2012. Residents began moving into Peacock Commons in April 2012. Rent is subsidized by Santa Clara County Mental Health and paid on a sliding scale. On May 23, 2012, Santa Clara County Mental Health Board gave the Bill Wilson Center a Community Service Award.

In 2014, the organization helped 3,512 people. During meals, caseworkers meet with the youths and counsel them on various topics like resumes and drug addictions. Between 80% and 89% of the people they helped in 2014 were able to rejoin their families or move into stable housing.
