= William Wilson (Iowa politician) =

American politician (1820–1900)

William Wilson (8 February 1820 – 22 March 1900) was an American politician.

Wilson was born in Concord, Pennsylvania, on 8 February 1820 and moved to Washington, Iowa, in 1854. Wilson and A. H. Wallace formed a business partnership within the furniture and timber industry, which lasted for thirty five years. Wilson contested the 1875 Iowa Senate election as a Democratic Party candidate and defeated Republican Henri Wallace in District 15 and was subsequently redistricted to District 14 by 1877. Wilson went out of business in the 1880s and split his retirement between the residences of his three sons. At the time of his death on 22 March 1990, Wilson was living with his son in Keota, Iowa.
