= Hiram Bailey =

American politician (1824–1896)

Hiram Bailey (12 July 1824 – 26 December 1896) was an American politician.

== Early life ==
Bailey was born in Townsend, Erie County, Ohio, on 12 July 1824 to parents, Benjamin and Philena Bailey.

== Professional career ==
Between 1874 and 1878, Bailey was a Republican member of the Iowa Senate, representing District 48. At the time, the district included Bremer and Howard as well as Chickasaw County.

== Personal life ==
He married Martha A. Odgen, moved to Chickasaw County, Iowa, and became a farmer.

== Death ==
Bailey died on 26 December 1896.
