= George A. Rothrock =

American historian

George Abel Rothrock Jr. (November 11, 1932 – April 3, 1993) was a professor of European history at the University of Alberta, known for his research on the military history of early modern Europe and the Ancien Régime in France, including books on Huguenots and on 17th-century military engineer Sébastien Le Prestre de Vauban, and a translation of de Vauban's work.

== Life ==
Rothrock was born on November 11, 1932 in Wilmington, Delaware, and was a 1954 graduate of the University of Delaware. He became a graduate student of history at the University of Minnesota, earning a master's degree there in 1956 and completing his Ph.D. in 1958. His dissertation, The French Crown and the Estates General of 1614, was supervised by John Baptist Wolf.

After postdoctoral research as a Fulbright Scholar at the University of Grenoble, Rothrock returned to the US, and taught at the University of Omaha from 1958 to 1962, at University of Michigan from 1962 to 1963, and at the University of Saskatchewan from 1963 to 1964. He joined the University of Alberta faculty in 1964 as an associate professor in 1964, became a full professor in 1971, and retired as a professor emeritus in 1992.

He died on April 3, 1993.

== Books ==
Rothrock was the author or translator of:

- Sébastien Le Prestre de Vauban, A Manual of Siegecraft and Fortification, translated into English by Rothrock (University of Michigan Press, 1968).
- Europe: A Brief History (Rand McNally, 1971; 2nd ed., with Tom B. Jones, 1975)
- The Huguenots: A Biography of A Minority (Nelson-Hall, 1979)
- Soldier of France, Sébastien Le Prestre de Vauban: 1633–1707 (with F. J. Hebbert, New York: Peter Lang, 1990)
