= Aaron Kimball =

American politician (1836–1899)

Aaron Kimball (1836 – 1899) was an American politician, farmer and banker. He served as a member of the Iowa Senate, representing District 4, from 1878 to 1882.

== Biography ==
Aaron Kimball was born in New York City, to parents Thomas D. Kimball and Mary A. Young in 1836. He grew up on a farm near Elkhart, Indiana, and attended local schools, then moved to Ontario, Indiana, to enroll at Ontario Academy. Subsequently, Kimball graduated from the University of Michigan and became a schoolteacher. In 1857, Kimball relocated to Howard County, Iowa, and started farming. He remained on the farm until 1864, when he was elected to concurrent terms as Howard County supervisor and clerk of the courts. Kimball moved into Cresco in 1869, and founded the Kimball and Farnsworth bank. Kimball contested the 1877 Iowa Senate election as a Republican. He was elected to the Iowa Senate, representing District 44 and served until 1882. In 1885, Kimball retired and dissolved the bank he had founded. In retirement, he moved to Austin, Minnesota, where he died on 16 January 1899. He was buried at Oak Lawn Cemetery in Cresco, Iowa.
