= Alfred N. Poyneer =

American politician

Alferd Poyneer

14th Lieutenant Governor of Iowa
- In office 1890–1892
- Governor: Horace Boies
- Preceded by: John A. T. Hull
- Succeeded by: Samuel L. Bestow

Member of the Iowa Senate
- In office January 9, 1882 – January 12, 1890
- Constituency: 45th district

Personal details
- Born: July 29, 1831 Connecticut
- Died: August 28, 1897 (aged 66)

Alfred Nelson Poyneer (July 29, 1831 – August 28, 1897) was an American politician and farmer.

Born in Connecticut, Poyneer settled in Montour, Iowa and owned a farm. He served in the Iowa State Senate from 1882 to 1890 and later served as Lieutenant Governor of Iowa from 1890 to 1892. He died in Montour, Iowa in 1897.

Political offices
Preceded by John A. T. Hull	Lieutenant Governor of Iowa; 1890–1892	Succeeded by Samuel L. Bestow
