= William Harrison Gallup =

American journalist and politician (1840–1929)

William Harrison Gallup (May 17, 1840 – October 26, 1929) was an American journalist and politician.

Gallup was born on May 17, 1840, in Summit, New York, to parents Nathan Gallup and Pamela Baird. After attending schools in Warnerville, Charlotteville, and Fredonia, and a seminary, he began teaching. In 1859, Gallup enrolled at the State and National Law School. Upon earning his law degree, he began practicing law in Newburgh. Gallup subsequently moved west, settling in Marshalltown, Iowa in May 1861, where he continued his practice of law for some time.

Gallup began his journalism career by acquiring the Marshalltown Times in October 1861. During the Siege of Vicksburg, Gallup transformed the Times into the first daily publication on the section of the Chicago and North Western Railway between Chicago and Council Bluffs. He moved to Boonsboro in December 1864 and founded the Boone Standard. By 1870, Gallup became publisher of Nevada, Iowa's Nevada Representative.

Gallup ran in the 1875 Iowa Senate election as a Republican and won the District 45 seat. He was redistricted in 1877 and remained on the Iowa Senate through 1880, retiring and vacating the District 33 seat. Between 1887 and 1892, Gallup owned the Perry Chief, headquartered in Perry, Iowa. Upon returning to Boone that year, Gallup invested in the Boone Republican, and became sole owner of that publication by 1896. Three years later, he founded the Monthly Review and Advertiser, serving as its publisher from February 1899 to March 1900. Gallup subsequently resumed editorial control and ownership of the Boone Standard in January 1902, retired in June 1908, and died at his home in Boone on October 26, 1929. Gallup was buried in Marshalltown's Riverside Cemetery, next to his wife, who had died in 1923.
