= Henry Rothert =

American politician (1840–1920)

Henry W. Rothert (11 September 1840 – 29 January 1920) was an American politician.

Rothert was of German descent, born to parents John H. and Margaret Rothert on 11 September 1840. The family resided in Cincinnati, Ohio. After Rothert graduated from high school there, he joined his brothers' hardware business. The Rotherts opened a branch in Keokuk, Iowa, in 1858, and Henry moved west to manage it. Rothert was a Republican. He was elected an alderman of Keokuk in 1868, and served through 1871, when he was elected mayor of the city. Rothert was reelected to the mayoralty the next year, and subsequently contested the 1873 Iowa Senate election. Rothert sat in the Iowa Senate until 1878, representing District 1. He was president pro-tempore of the senate, and was duly elevated to acting lieutenant governor upon the ascension of Joshua G. Newbold to the governorship as Samuel J. Kirkwood took office in the United States Senate. Rothert was named register of the land office in Cheyenne, Wyoming, and held the position for approximately four years. In the same year that he had accepted the Wyoming post, Rothert contested the state senate seat he had once held. He won the 1881 election and served through 1886.

In 1886, he investigated the Union Pacific Railroad's land department for the company president, Charles Francis Adams Jr. The railroad had large land grants that it tried to sell off to people who wanted to live in the Midwest and West to encourage economic development. Rothert acknowledged the difference between settlers, i.e., farmers and ranchers, and investors, who purchased land for speculative profit. Insofar as the railroad's immigration promoters tried to sell off larger tracts of land to earn more commission, some farmers bought more land than they could use and would sell off part of it later, so they became both settlers and investors. On May 8, 1886, Rothert recommended to the Union Pacific that promoters be recognized for how many settlers they brought in, not how much land they sold.

In later life, Rothert focused on the field of education. He had previously served nine years on the Keokuk school board, and after he raised a deaf son, accepted the superintendency of the Iowa School for the Deaf in 1887. Rothert resigned the position in August 1919, and remained in Council Bluffs, where he died on 29 January 1920.
