= Moses A. McCoid =

American politician

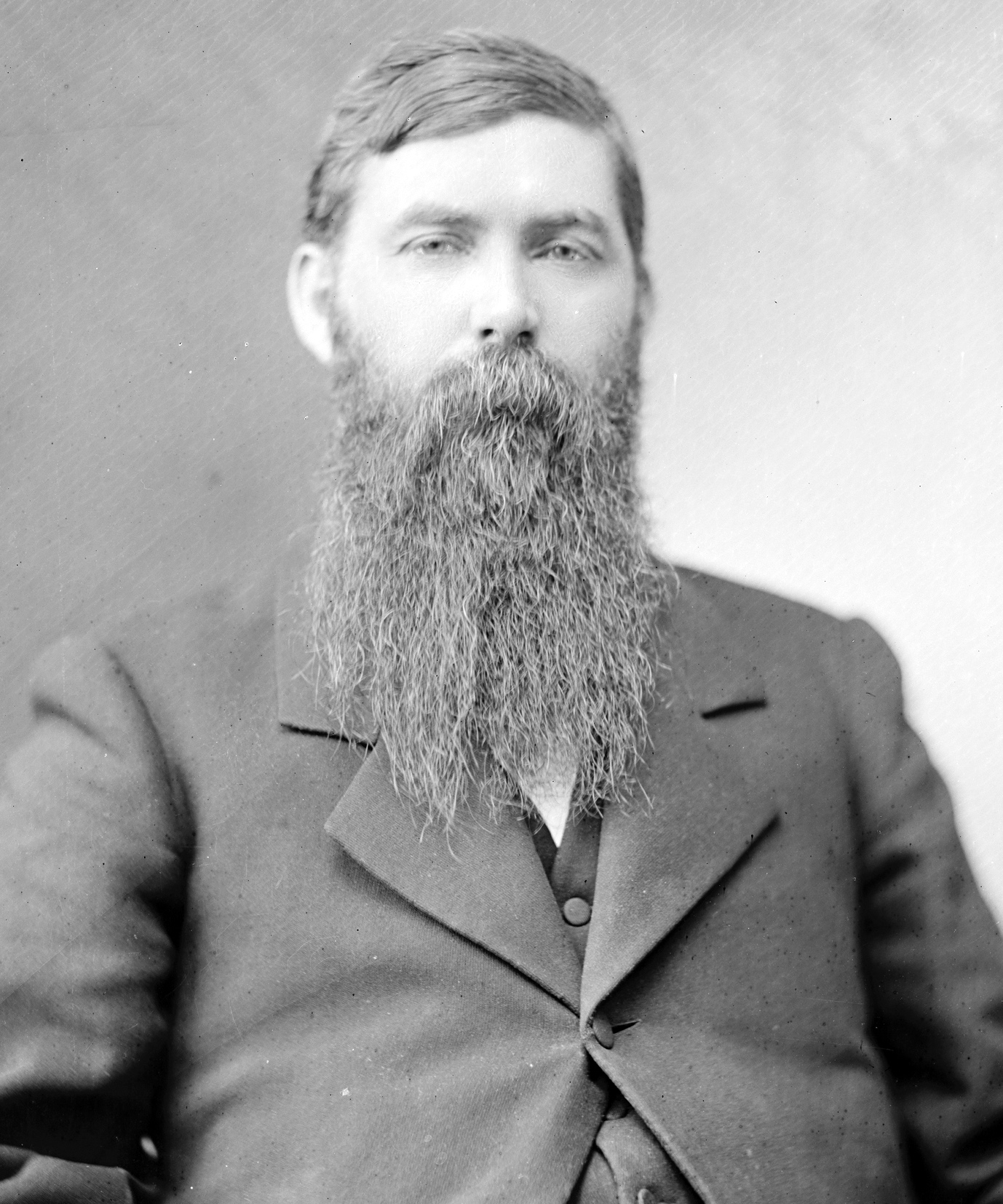

Member of the U.S. House of Representatives from Iowa's 1st district
- In office March 4, 1879 – March 3, 1885
- Preceded by: Joseph C. Stone
- Succeeded by: Benton J. Hall

Member of the Iowa Senate
- In office 1872–1879

Personal details
- Born: Moses Ayers McCold; November 5, 1840 near Bellefontaine, Ohio, US
- Died: May 19, 1904 (aged 63) Fairfield, Iowa, US
- Education: Washington College
- Occupation: Lawyer

Military service
- Allegiance: United States
- Branch/service: Army
- Rank: Adjutant
- Battles/wars: Fort Donelson; Shiloh; Corinth; Bear Creek; Resaca; Oostanaula River

Moses Ayers McCoid (November 5, 1840 – May 19, 1904) was a Union Army officer in the American Civil War and a three-term Republican U.S. Representative from Iowa's 1st congressional district in southeastern Iowa.

Born near Bellefontaine, Ohio, McCoid attended the public schools and Washington College (now Washington & Jefferson College), in Washington, Pennsylvania. He studied law in Fairfield, Iowa with future congressman and U.S. senator James F. Wilson. McCoid was admitted to the bar in 1861 and commenced practice in Fairfield.

On May 6, 1861, at the outbreak of the Civil War, he enlisted as a private in Company E, 2nd Iowa Volunteer Infantry Regiment. He took part in the battles of Fort Donelson, Shiloh, Corinth, Bear Creek, Resaca and Oostanaula River. He was first promoted to second lieutenant and later to adjutant of the regiment.

Following the war, he resumed the practice of law in Fairfield. He served as district attorney of the sixth judicial district of Iowa in 1867 and 1871. He served as member of the Iowa Senate from 1872 to 1879.

In 1878, McCoid was first elected as a Republican to represent Iowa's 1st congressional district in the U.S. House. He was re-elected twice, and served in the Forty-sixth, Forty-seventh, and Forty-eighth Congresses. He was an unsuccessful candidate for the Republican renomination in 1884, losing to John S. Woolson, who then lost in the general election to Democrat Benton Jay Hall. In all, McCoid served in Congress from March 4, 1879, to March 3, 1885.

After leaving Congress, McCoid again resumed the practice of law.

He died in Fairfield on May 19, 1904. He was interred in Evergreen Cemetery.

U.S. House of Representatives
Preceded by Joseph C. Stone	Member of the U.S. House of Representatives from Iowa's 1st congressional district 1879–1885	Succeeded by Benton J. Hall
