= John Thompson Stoneman =

American politician (1831–1903)

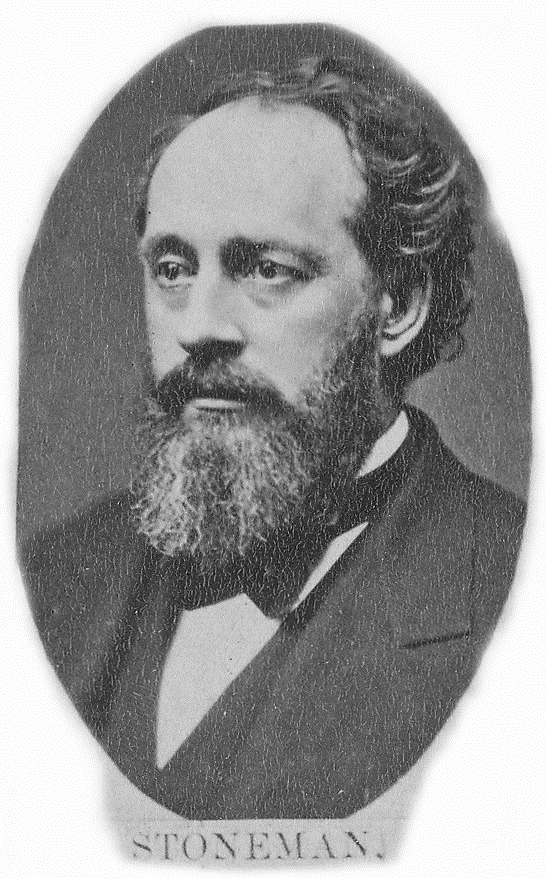
Stoneman c. 1876

John Thompson Stoneman (February 24, 1831 – October 11, 1905) was an American politician.

== Biography ==
Born on February 24, 1831, to parents George Stoneman and Catherine Cheney, John Thompson Stoneman was raised in Ellery, New York, and attended Jamestown Academy, as did his eldest brother George Stoneman Jr. At the age of twenty, Stoneman moved to Covington, Kentucky. After one year as a teacher, he enrolled at Williams College, graduating in 1856. During the summers, Stoneman attended Albany Law School to further his legal education, which began by reading law with Covington-based judge R. B. Carpenter. Stoneman passed the bar in January 1855.

In October 1856, Stoneman settled in McGregor, Iowa, to practice law. He was elected the town's inaugural recorder in 1857. After a period of service on the city council, in 1863, Stoneman was elevated to the mayoralty. He then served on the school board before he was elected to the Iowa Senate in 1875. Stoneman represented Senate District 39 from 1876 to 1878, when he was redistricted to District 40, which he served until 1880.

Stoneman began his political career in the Whig Party. Upon its dissolution, he became affiliated with the Democratic Party. Aside from serving in the Iowa General Assembly, Stoneman ran in the 1866–67 special and 1870–71 United States Senate elections, losing to Samuel J. Kirkwood and James B. Howell, respectively. Stoneman was twice a United States House of Representatives candidate for Iowa's 3rd congressional district, in 1870–71 and 1872–73, losing both times to William G. Donnan.

Stoneman moved from McGregor to Cedar Rapids in 1882, and served two terms on the Superior Court. Stoneman died on October 11, 1905, at the Cedar Rapids home of his son-in-law and former law partner, Asahel Chapin.
