= Fred Teale =

English-born American politician (1836–1914)

- Born: Frederick Joseph Teale c. 1836; Greenwich, England
- Died: 20 June 1914 (aged 78); Los Angeles, California, United States
- Occupation: politician
- Years active: 1870–1880
- Known for: Iowa House of Representatives, Iowa Senate
- Political party: Republican Party

Frederick Joseph Teale (c. 1836 – 20 June 1914) was an English-born American politician in the state of Iowa.

Teale, a native of Greenwich born in about 1836, left England in 1843 for the United States. By 1859, he had moved to Decatur County, Iowa, where he farmed near Decatur City. During the American Civil War, Teale served in the Union Army. He held the District 12 seat in the Iowa House of Representatives for two terms of two years each, from 1870 to 1874. He then served in the Iowa Senate between 1876 and 1880, first for District 6 until 1878, and thereafter for District 7. Throughout his political career, Teale was affiliated with the Republican Party. Shortly after stepping down from the Iowa General Assembly, Teale moved to Los Angeles, where he spent the final three decades of his life, and died on 20 June 1914, aged 78.
