= Samuel L. Bestow =

American politician

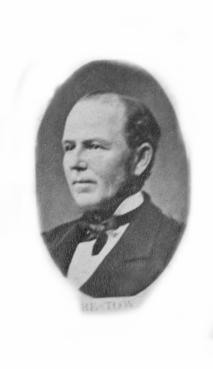

15th Lieutenant Governor of Iowa
- In office 1892–1894
- Governor: Horace Boies
- Preceded by: Alfred N. Poyneer
- Succeeded by: Warren S. Dungan

Member of the Iowa Senate
- In office January 10, 1876 – January 11, 1880
- Constituency: 6th district (1876-1878); 5th district (1878-1880)

Personal details
- Born: March 8, 1823 Erie County, New York
- Died: January 10, 1907 (aged 83) Chariton, Iowa
- Party: Democratic Party

Samuel Lucius Bestow (March 8, 1823 – January 10, 1907) was an American politician from Iowa. Bestow served in the Iowa State Senate. He was also the first Democrat to serve as the Lieutenant Governor of Iowa from 1892 to 1894. He previously served in the Iowa Senate from 1882 to 1890.

== Notes ==
Political offices
Preceded by Alfred N. Poyneer	Lieutenant Governor of Iowa; 1892–1894	Succeeded by Warren S. Dungan
