= Iowa Official Register =

Biannual publication of Iowa government and history

- The 1961-1962 Iowa Official Register.
- Author: Various
- Genre: Iowa reference, biannual.
- Publisher: Government of Iowa
- Published: 1860 – present
- Media type: Physical and electronic.

The Iowa Official Register, also called the Redbook or Red Book, is a publication of the State of Iowa. It contains mini-biographies and photos of Iowa's elected and appointed officials, records of elections, essays on selected topics in Iowa history, and general statistics of the state, among other topics.

== History ==
It was first authorized by law by Iowa's 24th General Assembly in 1892, with an official mandate to include "historical, political, and other statistics of general value, but nothing of a partisan character," though earlier editions had been published, primarily by Iowa Secretaries of State. The book's origins can be traced to the 7-page 1860 booklet entitled "Eighth General Assembly," and the name "Iowa Official Register" was first used in a 19-page 1873 booklet, though it appeared under other titles during the following years. It eventually gained the nickname "Redbook" from the fact that since 1907, it has been published with a red cover. Today, the Register has a fairly-standardized format, including a biannual publication scheme, and runs 450 to 600 pages in length.

It was continuously printed from 1886 to 1906 every year. It then began to be printed every second year from 1908 to 2000, then again from 2005 to the present.
