= 1887 Iowa Senate election =

- November 8, 1887

32 out of 50 seats in the Iowa State Senate 26 seats needed for a majority
	Majority party	Minority party	Third party
Party	Republican	Democratic	Independent
Last election	31	19	0
Seats after	32	16	2
Seat change	▲1	▼3	▲2

In the 1887 Iowa State Senate elections Iowa voters elected state senators to serve in the twenty-second Iowa General Assembly. Elections were held in 32 of the state senate's 50 districts. State senators serve four-year terms in the Iowa State Senate.

A statewide map of the 50 state Senate districts in the 1887 elections is provided by the Iowa General Assembly here.

The general election took place on November 8, 1887.

Following the previous election, Republicans had control of the Iowa Senate with 31 seats to Democrats' 19 seats.

To claim control of the chamber from Republicans, the Democrats needed to net 7 Senate seats.

Republicans maintained control of the Iowa State Senate following the 1887 general election with the balance of power shifting to Republicans holding 32 seats, Democrats having 16 seats, and two Independents (a net gain of 1 seat for Republicans and 2 seats for Independents).

== Summary of Results ==
- Note: The holdover Senators not up for re-election are not listed on this table.

Senate District	Incumbent	Party	Elected Senator	Party	Outcome
1st (Note: Election was held to fill a vacancy.)	Joseph M. Casey (Note: Senator Casey resigned, causing a vacancy.)	Dem	William Gustavus Kent	Dem	Dem Hold
2nd	John Wesley Carr	Dem	Benjamin Rex Vale	Rep	Rep Gain
3rd	Edward J. Gault	Dem	William Henry Taylor	Dem	Dem Hold
4th	Lewis Miles	Rep	Warren S. Dungan	Rep	Rep Hold
5th	John McDonough	Rep	James B. Harsh	Rep	Rep Hold
6th	Anson P. Stephens	Rep	George L. Finn	Rep	Rep Hold
8th	James S. Hendrie	Dem	Thomas Weidman	Rep	Rep Gain
11th	Francis Alexander Duncan	Rep	James Henry Barnett	Ind	Ind. Gain
12th (Note: Districts in the Iowa Senate were redrawn in advance of the 1887 election. Several incumbents were redistricted to new district numbers between the 21st and 22nd Iowa General Assemblies. Use these links to compared the districts: 21st (1886-1887) and 22nd (1888–1906).)	Joseph G. Hutchison (Note: Senator Hutchison was not up for election. He was a holdover Senator redistricted from district 12 to 13.)	Rep	James Dooley (Note: Senator Dooley was not up for election. He was a holdover Senator redistricted from district 13 to 12.)	Dem	Dem Gain
13th	James Dooley	Dem	Joseph G. Hutchison	Rep	Rep Gain
14th	Benjamin McCoy	Rep	Benjamin McCoy	Rep	Rep Hold
15th	Edward R. Cassatt	Dem	Edward R. Cassatt	Dem	Dem Hold
16th	Eli Wilkin	Rep	Richard Price	Rep	Rep Hold
17th	Timothy Jordan Caldwell	Rep	Timothy Jordan Caldwell	Rep	Rep Hold
19th	George Carson	Rep	William Groneweg	Dem	Dem Gain
23rd	Gilman Lewis Johnson	Dem	August George Kegler	Dem	Dem Hold
24th	John C. Chambers	Rep	Erastus B. Bills	Dem	Dem Gain
25th	Moses Bloom	Dem	Michael Joseph Kelly	Dem	Dem Hold
26th	John Wimberly Henderson	Dem	Jesse H. Smith	Rep	Rep Gain
27th	John Ryder	Dem	Josiah D. McVay	Rep	Rep Gain
28th	Preston M. Sutton	Rep	William D. Mills	Rep	Rep Hold
31st	John Scott	Rep	Defiance Barnes Davidson	Rep	Rep Hold
32nd	Myron Underwood	Rep	Joseph S. Lawrence	Rep	Rep Hold
33rd	William G. Donnan	Rep	Edward Paxson Seeds	Rep	Rep Hold
36th	Frank Davis Bayless	Dem	Frank Davis Bayless	Dem	Dem Hold
39th	Alvin Manley Whaley	Rep	Lewis S. Hanchett	Ind	Ind. Gain
40th	Willard Chauncey Earle	Dem	Leslie B. Mattoon	Dem	Dem Hold
41st	Joseph Henry Sweney	Rep	Joseph Henry Sweney	Rep	Rep Hold
42nd	Theodore Weld Burdick (Note: Senator Burdick resigned, causing a vacancy.)	Rep	Samuel Ambrose Converse	Rep	Rep Hold
43rd	John D. Glass	Rep	Norman Vaughan Brower	Rep	Rep Hold
46th	Charles Edwin Whiting	Dem	Adolph Freeland Meservey	Rep	Rep Gain
47th	Charles C. Chubb	Rep	Abraham B. Funk	Rep	Rep Hold
49th	Orsmond M. Barrett	Rep	Orsmond M. Barrett	Rep	Rep Hold
50th	Gifford Simeon Robinson (Note: Senator Robinson resigned, causing a vacancy.)	Rep	Abraham Oscar Garlock	Rep	Rep Hold

== Detailed Results ==
- NOTE: The Iowa Official Register does not contain detailed vote totals for state senate elections in 1887.

== See also ==
- Elections in Iowa
