= 1891 Iowa Senate election =

- November 3, 1891

32 out of 50 seats in the Iowa State Senate 26 seats needed for a majority
	Majority party	Minority party	Third party
Party	Democratic	Republican	Populist
Last election	20	28	0
Seats after	25	24	1 (Note: Senator Perry Engle switched parties from Union Labor to People's Party after the election.)
Seat change	▲5	▼4	▲1
	Fourth party	Fifth party
Party	Union Labor	Independent
Last election	1	1
Seats after	0	0
Seat change	▼1	▼1

In the 1891 Iowa State Senate elections Iowa voters elected state senators to serve in the twenty-fourth Iowa General Assembly. Elections were held in 32 of the state senate's 50 districts. State senators serve four-year terms in the Iowa State Senate.

A statewide map of the 50 state Senate districts in the 1891 elections is provided by the Iowa General Assembly here.

The general election took place on November 3, 1891.

Following the previous election, Republicans had control of the Iowa Senate with 28 seats to Democrats' 20 seats, one seat for the Union Labor Party and one Independent.

To claim control of the chamber from Republicans, the Democrats needed to net 5 Senate seats.

Democrats claimed control of the Iowa State Senate following the 1891 general election with the balance of power shifting to Democrats holding 25 seats, Republicans having 24 seats, and a lone seat for the People's Party (a net gain of 5 seats for Democrats and 1 seat for the People's Party).

== Summary of Results ==
- Note: The holdover Senators not up for re-election are not listed on this table.

Senate District	Incumbent	Party	Elected Senator	Party	Outcome
2nd	Benjamin Rex Vale	Rep	Benjamin Rex Vale	Rep	Rep Hold
3rd	William Henry Taylor	Dem	Ephraim M. Reynolds	Rep	Rep Gain
4th	Warren S. Dungan	Rep	Lester W. Lewis	Rep	Rep Hold
5th	James B. Harsh	Rep	James B. Harsh	Rep	Rep Hold
6th	George L. Finn	Rep	George L. Finn	Rep	Rep Hold
8th	Thomas Weidman	Rep	Allen Joseph Chantry	Rep	Rep Hold
10th (Note: Election was held to fill a vacancy.)	John Simpson Woolson (Note: Senator Woolson resigned, causing a vacancy.)	Rep	David James Palmer	Rep	Rep Hold
11th	James Henry Barnett	Ind	James H. Jamison	Rep	Rep Gain
13th	Peter G. Ballingall (Note: On March 7, 1891, Peter G. Ballingall died causing a vacancy.)	Dem	James Joseph Smith	Dem	Dem Hold
14th	Benjamin McCoy	Rep	Alpheus Barto Conaway	Rep	Rep Hold
15th	Edward R. Cassatt	Dem	Theodore Bolivar Perry	Dem	Dem Hold
16th	Richard Price	Rep	Alva Lysander Hager (Note: On March 3, 1893, Alva Lysander Hager resigned his seat in the Iowa Senate to go to the United States House of Representatives, causing a vacancy.)	Rep	Rep Hold
17th	Timothy Jordan Caldwell	Rep	Henry Franklin Andrews	Rep	Rep Hold
19th	William Groneweg	Dem	William Groneweg	Dem	Dem Hold
22nd	Patrick Bernard Wolfe (Note: Senator Wolfe resigned, causing a vacancy.)	Dem	Silas Wright Gardiner	Dem	Dem Hold
23rd	August George Kegler	Dem	Alfred Hurst	Dem	Dem Hold
24th	Erastus B. Bills	Dem	John Aloysius Green	Dem	Dem Hold
25th	Michael Joseph Kelly	Dem	Michael Joseph Kelly	Dem	Dem Hold
26th	Jesse H. Smith	Rep	John McClure Terry	Dem	Dem Gain
27th	Josiah D. McVay	Rep	Olaf Martin Oleson	Dem	Dem Gain
28th	William D. Mills	Rep	George A. Turner	Rep	Rep Hold
29th (Note: There was not an election in the twenty-ninth senatorial district in 1891. Instead, incumbent Senator Perry Engle switched parties.)	Perry Engle	Union Labor	Perry Engle	People's	People's Gain
31st	Defiance Barnes Davidson	Rep	Thomas Clifton McCall (Note: On August 11, 1892, Senator T. C. McCall died during the term.)	Rep	Rep Hold
32nd	Joseph S. Lawrence	Rep	James D. Yeomans	Dem	Dem Gain
33rd	Edward Paxson Seeds (Note: Senator Seeds resigned on November 3, 1890, causing a vacancy.)	Rep	Merritt W. Harmon	Rep	Rep Hold
36th	Frank Davis Bayless	Dem	John Everall	Dem	Dem Hold
39th	Lewis S. Hanchett	Rep	Robert S. Smith (Note: On August 27, 1893, Robert S. Smith died during his term.)	Dem	Dem Gain
40th	Leslie B. Mattoon	Dem	Leslie B. Mattoon	Dem	Dem Hold
41st	Jefferson Fern Clyde	Rep	Charles Fred Jewett	Rep	Rep Hold
43rd	Norman Vaughan Brower	Rep	Norman Vaughan Brower	Rep	Rep Hold
46th	Adolph Freeland Meservey	Rep	William Hamilton Dent	Dem	Dem Gain
47th	Abraham B. Funk	Rep	Abraham B. Funk	Rep	Rep Hold
49th	Orsmond M. Barrett	Rep	Luther H. Bishop	Dem	Dem Gain

== Detailed Results ==
- NOTE: The Iowa Official Register does not contain detailed vote totals for state senate elections in 1891.

== See also ==
- Elections in Iowa
