= 1893 Iowa Senate election =

- November 7, 1893

24 out of 50 seats in the Iowa State Senate 26 seats needed for a majority
	Majority party	Minority party	Third party
Party	Republican	Democratic	Populist
Last election	24	25	1
Seats after	34	16	0
Seat change	▲10	▼9	▼1

In the 1893 Iowa State Senate elections Iowa voters elected state senators to serve in the twenty-fifth Iowa General Assembly. Elections were held in 24 of the state senate's 50 districts. State senators serve four-year terms in the Iowa State Senate.

A statewide map of the 50 state Senate districts in the 1893 elections is provided by the Iowa General Assembly here.

The general election took place on November 7, 1893.

Following the previous election, Democrats had control of the Iowa Senate with 25 seats to Republicans' 24 seats and one seat held by the People's Party.

To claim control of the chamber from Democrats, the Republicans needed to net 2 Senate seats.

Republicans claimed control of the Iowa State Senate following the 1893 general election with the balance of power shifting to Republicans holding 34 seats, Democrats having 16 seats, and the People's Party losing its lone seat (a net gain of 10 seats for Republicans).

== Summary of Results ==
- Note: The holdover Senators not up for re-election are not listed on this table.

Senate District	Incumbent	Party	Elected Senator	Party	Outcome
1st	William Gustavus Kent	Dem	John Downey	Dem	Dem Hold
7th	George Willard Perkins	Rep	William Eaton	Rep	Rep Hold
9th	William W. Dodge	Dem	Thomas G. Harper	Dem	Dem Hold
10th	David James Palmer	Rep	David James Palmer	Rep	Rep Hold
12th	Joel Stewart	Dem	John A. Riggen	Rep	Rep Gain
13th	James Joseph Smith	Dem	Harrison Lyman Waterman	Rep	Rep Gain
16th (Note: Election was held to fill a vacancy.)	Alva Lysander Hager (Note: On March 3, 1893, Alva Lysander Hager resigned his seat in the Iowa Senate to go to the United States House of Representatives, causing a vacancy.)	Rep	Lucien Moody Kilburn	Rep	Rep Hold
18th	William Fiske Cleveland	Dem	Julian Phelps	Rep	Rep Gain
20th	John M. Gobble	Dem	Charles Albert Carpenter	Rep	Rep Gain
21st	William O. Schmidt	Dem	Charles G. Hipwell	Dem	Dem Hold
22nd	Silas Wright Gardiner	Dem	Lyman A. Ellis	Rep	Rep Gain
29th	Perry Engle	People's	Joseph R. Gorrell (Note: Senator Gorrell was elected to the senate from the twenty-ninth district in 1893 as a Republican. He was then re-elected in 1897 on the Democratic ticket.)	Rep	Rep Gain
30th	Conduce H. Gatch	Rep	Thomas Abbott Cheshire	Rep	Rep Hold
31st	Thomas Clifton McCall (Note: On August 11, 1892, Senator T. C. McCall died, causing a vacancy.)	Rep	H. C. Boardman	Rep	Rep Hold
34th	Lemuel Rose Bolter	Dem	Rudolph C. H. Lehfeldt	Rep	Rep Gain
35th	James Hannibal Shields	Dem	Isaac W. Baldwin	Dem	Dem Hold
37th	William Callum Smith	Rep	John English Rowen	Rep	Rep Hold
38th	Mathies Parrott	Rep	John Morris Rea (Note: On August 25, 1895, John Morris Rea died during the term.)	Rep	Rep Hold
39th	Robert S. Smith (Note: On August 27, 1893, Robert S. Smith died causing a vacancy.)	Dem	George M. Craig	Rep	Rep Gain
42nd	Ansel Kinne Bailey	Rep	Clark C. Upton	Rep	Rep Hold
44th	Robert George Reiniger	Rep	William Burton Perrin	Rep	Rep Hold
45th	Jacob J. Mosnat	Dem	Emlen G. Penrose	Rep	Rep Gain
48th	Thomas Rich	Dem	Warren Garst	Rep	Rep Gain
50th	Edgar Eugene Mack	Rep	George W. Henderson	Rep	Rep Hold

== Detailed Results ==
- NOTE: The Iowa Official Register does not contain detailed vote totals for state senate elections in 1893.

== See also ==
- Elections in Iowa
