= 1883 Iowa Senate election =

- October 9, 1883

29 out of 50 seats in the Iowa State Senate 26 seats needed for a majority
| | Majority party | Minority party | Third party |
|---|---|---|---|
| Party | Republican | Democratic | Greenback |
| Last election | 45 | 2 | 2 |
| Seats after | 39 | 11 | 0 |
| Seat change | ▼6 | ▲9 | ▼2 |
| | Fourth party |
| Party | Independent |
| Last election | 1 |
| Seats after | 0 |
| Seat change | ▼1 |

In the 1883 Iowa State Senate elections Iowa voters elected state senators to serve in the twentieth Iowa General Assembly. Elections were held in 29 of the state senate's 50 districts. State senators serve four-year terms in the Iowa State Senate.

The general election took place on October 9, 1883.

Following the previous election, Republicans had control of the Iowa Senate with 45 seats to Democrats' two seats, two Greenbackers, and one Independent.

To claim control of the chamber from Republicans, the Democrats needed to net 24 Senate seats.

Republicans maintained control of the Iowa State Senate following the 1883 general election with the balance of power shifting to Republicans holding 39 seats and Democrats having 11 seats (a net gain of 9 seats for Democrats).

== Summary of Results ==
- Note: The holdover Senators not up for re-election are not listed on this table.

| Senate District | Incumbent | Party | Elected Senator | Party | Outcome |
|---|---|---|---|---|---|
| 2nd | Alexander Brown | Rep | John Wesley Carr | Dem | Dem Gain |
| 3rd | Jesse J. Wall | Greenbacker | Edward J. Gault | Dem | Dem Gain |
| 4th | David M. Clark | Greenbacker | Thomas Weidman | Rep | Rep Gain |
| 5th | William M. Wilson | Rep | John McDonough | Rep | Rep Hold |
| 6th | Isaac W. Keller | Rep | Anson P. Stephens | Rep | Rep Hold |
| 8th | Alfred Hebard | Rep | James S. Hendrie | Dem | Dem Gain |
| 11th | Sanford M. Boling | Rep | Francis Alexander Duncan | Rep | Rep Hold |
| 14th | John Wesley Prizer | Rep | Benjamin McCoy | Rep | Rep Hold |
| 15th | John Kelly Johnson | Rep | Edward R. Cassatt | Dem | Dem Gain |
| 16th | James F. Greenlee | Rep | Eli Wilkin | Rep | Rep Hold |
| 17th | Mark Antony Dashiell | Rep | Timothy Jordan Caldwell | Rep | Rep Hold |
| 19th | George Franklin Wright | Rep | George Carson | Rep | Rep Hold |
| 23rd | John Russell | Rep | Gilman Lewis Johnson | Dem | Dem Gain |
| 24th | Pierce Mitchell | Dem | John C. Chambers | Rep | Rep Gain |
| 25th | John Clinton Shrader | Rep | Moses Bloom | Dem | Dem Gain |
| 26th (Note: Districts in the Iowa Senate were redrawn in advance of the 1883 election. Several incumbents were redistricted to new district numbers between the 19th and 20th Iowa General Assemblies. Use these links to compare the districts:19th (1878-1883) and 20th (1884-1885).) | William Aitken Patrick | Rep | John Wimberly Henderson (Note: Senator Henderson was an incumbent Senator running for re-election. He switched parties from Independent to Democratic. Senator Henderson also was redistricted from district 27 to 26. He was re-elected to the Senate to the new 26th district as a Democrat in 1883.) | Dem | Dem Gain |
| 27th | John Wimberly Henderson | Ind | John Ryder | Dem | Dem Gain |
| 28th | John David Nichols | Rep | Preston M. Sutton | Rep | Rep Hold |
| 31st | Samuel D. Nichols | Rep | John Dudley Gillett (Note: Senator Gillett was an incumbent Senator running for re-election. Senator Gillett was redistricted from district 33 to 31. He was re-elected to the Senate to the new 31st district in 1883. Senator Gillett resigned during the next term, causing a vacancy.) | Rep | Rep Hold |
| 32nd | Delos Arnold | Rep | Enoch W. Eastman (Note: On January 9, 1885, Senator Eastman died during the next term, causing a vacancy.) | Rep | Rep Hold |
| 33rd | John Dudley Gillett | Rep | William G. Donnan | Rep | Rep Hold |
| 36th | Rodney W. Tirrill | Rep | Frank Davis Bayless | Dem | Dem Gain |
| 39th | Merritt W. Harmon | Rep | Alvin Manley Whaley (Note: Senator Whaley was an incumbent Senator running for re-election. Senator Whaley was redistricted from district 46 to 39. He was re-elected to the Senate to the new 39th district in 1883.) | Rep | Rep Hold |
| 40th | Martin Garber | Rep | William Larrabee (Note: Senator Larrabee was an incumbent Senator running for re-election. Senator Larrabee was redistricted from district 43 to 40. He was re-elected to the Senate to the new 40th district in 1883. Senator Larrabee was elected Governor of Iowa during the next term in 1885, causing a vacancy in the Iowa Senate.) | Rep | Rep Hold |
| 41st | Henry Nielander | Rep | Joseph Henry Sweney | Rep | Rep Hold |
| 43rd | William Larrabee | Rep | John D. Glass | Rep | Rep Hold |
| 46th | Alvin Manley Whaley | Rep | Charles Edwin Whiting | Dem | Dem Gain |
| 47th | Horace G. Parker | Rep | Charles C. Chubb | Rep | Rep Hold |
| 49th | Elden J. Hartshorn | Rep | Orsmond M. Barrett | Rep | Rep Hold |

== Detailed Results ==
- NOTE: The Iowa Official Register does not contain detailed vote totals for state senate elections in 1883.

== See also ==
- Elections in Iowa
