= Michael Kelly =

Michael, Mike or Mick Kelly may refer to:

== Politics ==
- Michael John Kelly (1815–1890), political figure in Newfoundland
- Michael Kelly (Australian politician), New South Wales colonial politician
- Michael Joseph Kelly (American politician) (1850–1911), Irish-born American politician from Iowa
- Michael Kelly (Scottish politician) (born 1940), former lord provost of the city of Glasgow, Scotland and businessman
- Mike Kelly (Alaska politician) (1942–2016), Republican member of the Alaska House of Representatives
- Mike Kelly (Pennsylvania politician) (born 1948), politician and U.S. Representative from Pennsylvania
- Mike Kelly (Australian politician) (born 1960), Australian lawyer, soldier and politician
- Michael Kelly (Illinois politician) (born 1975), politician and athletic director from Illinois

== Sports ==
=== Association football ===
- Michael Kelly (footballer, born 1877), English footballer
- Mike Kelly (footballer, born 1942), English football goalkeeper and coach
- Mike Kelly (footballer, born 1954), English football midfielder
- Michael Kelly (footballer, born 1996), Irish footballer for Carlisle United
- Michael Kelly (footballer, born 1997), Scottish footballer for Bristol Rovers

=== Baseball ===
- King Kelly (Michael Joseph Kelly, 1857–1894), American baseball player
- Mike Kelly (baseball, born 1896) (Bernard Francis Kelly, 1896–1968), American baseball player, coach and manager
- Mike Kelly (pitcher) (1902–1982), American baseball player
- Mike Kelly (outfielder) (born 1970), American baseball player
- Michael Kelly (baseball) (born 1992), American baseball player

=== Gridiron football ===
- Mike Kelly (American football coach) (born 1948), University of Dayton football coach, 1981–2007
- Mike Kelly (gridiron football, born 1948), American college football and National Football League player
- Mike Kelly (gridiron football) (born 1958), American college football and Canadian Football League coach

=== Other sports ===
- Michael Kelly (sport shooter) (1872–1923), American Olympic sport shooter
- Mickey Kelly (1929–2011), Irish hurler
- Mick Kelly (Australian footballer) (born 1952), Australian rules football player for Footscray
- Mike Kelly (ice hockey) (born 1960), Canadian ice hockey executive
- Michael Kelly (Gaelic footballer), Irish sportsperson who represented Donegal
- Mike Kelly (basketball) (born 1967), American/Australian basketball coach and former player
- Michael Kelly (athletic director), University of South Florida athletic director

== Business ==
- Michael Eugene Kelly (1949–2013), automotive manufacturing entrepreneur and investment holding businessman
- Michael P. Kelly (born 1954), American architect and urban planner
- Michael Kelly, former president of Blockbuster LLC
- Michael J. Kelly (born 1957), American entrepreneur and media executive

== Music ==
- Michael Kelly (tenor) (1762–1826), Irish actor, singer and composer
- Michael Schermick (born 1958), known professionally as Michael Kelly Smith, American guitar player
- Mike Kelly, drummer for the band the Mission UK
- Michael Patrick Kelly (born 1977), Irish-American singer, musician and composer
- Michael Kelly Guitars, American guitar, bass, and mandolin manufacturer

== Writing ==
- Michael Kelly (editor) (1957–2003), American writer and editor
- Mike Kelly (journalist), American writer
- Michael Kelly (Irish journalist), Irish journalist
- Mick Kelly (writer), writer of Simpsons episode Little Orphan Millie

== Other ==
- Michael Kelly (bishop) (1850–1940), fourth Roman Catholic archbishop of Sydney
- Michael Kelly (Jesuit) (1929–2021), Irish Jesuit priest and missionary in Zambia
- Michael Kelly (physicist) (born 1949), New Zealand-British physicist
- M. G. Kelly (born 1952, as Gary D. Sinclair) "Michael Gary "M.G." Kelly", U.S. on-air personality
- Michael Kelly (actor) (born 1969), American actor

== See also ==
- Mike Kellie (1947–2017), English musician, composer and record producer
- Mike Kelley (disambiguation)
- Michael Joseph Kelly (disambiguation)
