= Michael Joseph Kelly =

Michael Joseph Kelly may refer to:

- King Kelly (Michael Joseph Kelly, 1857–1894), baseball player
- Michael Kelly (physicist) (born 1949), New Zealand-British physicist
- Mike Kelly (Australian politician) (born 1960), Australian politician
- Michael Kelly (actor) (born 1969), American actor
- Michael Joseph Kelly (American politician) (1850–1911), Irish-born American politician from Iowa

== See also ==
- Mike Kelley (baseball) (1875–1955), American baseball player and manager in the minor leagues
- Michael Kelly (disambiguation)
