= 1889 Iowa Senate election =

- November 5, 1889

22 out of 50 seats in the Iowa State Senate 26 seats needed for a majority
	Majority party	Minority party	Third party
Party	Republican	Democratic	Independent
Last election	32	16	2
Seats after	28	20	1
Seat change	▼4	▲4	▼1
	Fourth party
Party	Union Labor
Last election	0
Seats after	1
Seat change	▲1
- Democratic hold Republican hold Democratic gain Union Labor gain

In the 1889 Iowa State Senate elections Iowa voters elected state senators to serve in the twenty-third Iowa General Assembly. Elections were held in 22 of the state senate's 50 districts. State senators serve four-year terms in the Iowa State Senate.

A statewide map of the 50 state Senate districts in the 1889 elections is provided by the Iowa General Assembly here.

The general election took place on November 5, 1889.

Following the previous election, Republicans had control of the Iowa Senate with 32 seats to Democrats' 16 seats and two Independents.

To claim control of the chamber from Republicans, the Democrats needed to net 10 Senate seats.

Republicans maintained control of the Iowa State Senate following the 1889 general election with the balance of power shifting to Republicans holding 28 seats, Democrats having 20 seats, one Independent, and one member of the Union Labor Party (a net gain of 4 seats for Democrats and 1 seat for the Union Labor Party).

== Summary of Results ==
- Note: The holdover Senators not up for re-election are not listed on this table.

Senate District	Incumbent	Party	Elected Senator	Party	Outcome
1st	William Gustavus Kent	Dem	William Gustavus Kent	Dem	Dem Hold
7th	Talton Embrey Clark	Rep	George Willard Perkins	Rep	Rep Hold
9th	William W. Dodge	Dem	William W. Dodge	Dem	Dem Hold
10th	John S. Woolson	Rep	John S. Woolson (Note: Senator Woolson resigned during the next term, causing a vacancy.)	Rep	Rep Hold
12th	James Dooley	Dem	Joel Stewart	Dem	Dem Hold
13th	Joseph G. Hutchison	Rep	Peter G. Ballingall (Note: On March 7, 1891, Peter G. Ballingall died during the next term, causing a vacancy.)	Dem	Dem Gain
18th	Lafayette Young	Rep	William Fiske Cleveland	Dem	Dem Gain
20th	Samuel Tyler Chesebro	Dem	John M. Gobble	Dem	Dem Hold
21st	William O. Schmidt	Dem	William O. Schmidt	Dem	Dem Hold
22nd	Patrick Bernard Wolfe	Dem	Patrick Bernard Wolfe (Note: Senator Wolfe resigned during the next term, causing a vacancy.)	Dem	Dem Hold
29th	Malcolm P. Doud	Rep	Perry Engle (Note: Senator Perry Engle switched parties from Union Labor to People's Party after the election.)	Union Labor	Union Labor Gain
30th	Conduce H. Gatch	Rep	Conduce H. Gatch	Rep	Rep Hold
34th	Lemuel Rose Bolter	Dem	Lemuel Rose Bolter	Dem	Dem Hold
35th	William J. Knight	Dem	James Hannibal Shields	Dem	Dem Hold
37th	Nicholas F. Weber	Rep	William Callum Smith	Rep	Rep Hold
38th	Mathies Parrott	Rep	Mathies Parrott	Rep	Rep Hold
39th (Note: There was not an election in the thirty-ninth senatorial district in 1889. Instead, incumbent Senator Lewis S. Hanchett switched parties.)	Lewis S. Hanchett (Note: Senator Lewis S. Hanchett switched parties from Independent to Republican.)	Independent	Lewis S. Hanchett	Rep	Rep Gain
41st (Note: Election was held to fill a vacancy.)	Joseph Henry Sweney (Note: Senator Sweeney resigned his seat in the Iowa Senate after being elected to the United States House of Representatives, causing a vacancy.)	Rep	Jefferson Fern Clyde	Rep	Rep Hold
42nd	Samuel Ambrose Converse	Rep	Ansel Kinne Bailey	Rep	Rep Hold
44th	Robert George Reiniger	Rep	Robert George Reiniger	Rep	Rep Hold
45th	Alfred Nelson Poyneer	Rep	Jacob J. Mosnat	Dem	Dem Gain
48th	John Kelsey Deal	Rep	Thomas Rich	Dem	Dem Gain
50th	Abraham Oscar Garlock	Rep	Edgar Eugene Mack	Rep	Rep Hold

== Detailed Results ==
- NOTE: The Iowa Official Register does not contain detailed vote totals for state senate elections in 1889.

== See also ==
- Elections in Iowa
