= 1895 Iowa Senate election =

- November 5, 1895

31 out of 50 seats in the Iowa State Senate 26 seats needed for a majority
	Majority party	Minority party
Party	Republican	Democratic
Last election	34	16
Seats after	43	7
Seat change	▲9	▼9

In the 1895 Iowa State Senate elections Iowa voters elected state senators to serve in the twenty-sixth Iowa General Assembly. Elections were held in 31 of the state senate's 50 districts. State senators serve four-year terms in the Iowa State Senate.

A statewide map of the 50 state Senate districts in the 1895 elections is provided by the Iowa General Assembly here.

The general election took place on November 5, 1895.

Following the previous election, Republicans had control of the Iowa Senate with 34 seats to Democrats' 16 seats.

To claim control of the chamber from Republicans, the Democrats needed to net 10 Senate seats.

Republicans maintained control of the Iowa State Senate following the 1895 general election with the balance of power shifting to Republicans holding 43 seats and Democrats having 7 seats (a net gain of 9 seats for Republicans).

== Summary of Results ==
- Note: The holdover Senators not up for re-election are not listed on this table.

Senate District	Incumbent	Party	Elected Senator	Party	Outcome
2nd	Benjamin Rex Vale	Rep	Thomas Bell	Rep	Rep Hold
3rd	Ephraim M. Reynolds	Rep	Beryl F. Carroll	Rep	Rep Hold
4th	Lester W. Lewis	Rep	Harvey L. Byers	Rep	Rep Hold
5th	James B. Harsh	Rep	George S. Allyn	Rep	Rep Hold
6th	George L. Finn	Rep	William O. Mitchell	Rep	Rep Hold
8th	Allen Joseph Chantry	Rep	Joseph McKenna Junkin	Rep	Rep Hold
11th	James H. Jamison	Rep	William Henry Berry	Rep	Rep Hold
14th	Alpheus Barto Conaway	Rep	Lucian C. Blanchard	Rep	Rep Hold
15th	Theodore Bolivar Perry	Dem	Samuel Druet	Rep	Rep Gain
16th	Lucien Moody Kilburn	Rep	Lucien Moody Kilburn	Rep	Rep Hold
17th	Henry Franklin Andrews	Rep	Albert C. Hotchkiss	Rep	Rep Hold
19th	William Groneweg	Dem	Nathan Marsh Pusey	Rep	Rep Gain
23rd	Alfred Hurst	Dem	Alfred Hurst	Dem	Dem Hold
24th	John Aloysius Green	Dem	Frederick O. Ellison	Rep	Rep Gain
25th	Michael Joseph Kelly	Dem	Cyrus S. Ranck	Dem	Dem Hold
26th	John McClure Terry	Dem	Jeremiah Smyth Alexander	Rep	Rep Gain
27th	Olaf Martin Oleson	Dem	Thomas D. Healy	Rep	Rep Gain
28th	George A. Turner	Rep	James Loring Carney	Rep	Rep Hold
31st	H. C. Boardman	Rep	Charles J. A. Ericson	Rep	Rep Hold
32nd	James D. Yeomans	Dem	John Stillman Lothrop	Rep	Rep Gain
33rd	Merritt W. Harmon	Rep	Daniel Hiel Young	Rep	Rep Hold
35th (Note: Election was held to fill a vacancy.)	Isaac W. Baldwin (Note: On February 9, 1895, Isaac W. Baldwin died causing a vacancy.)	Dem	Robert Bonson	Dem	Dem Hold
36th	John Everall	Dem	John Everall	Dem	Dem Hold
38th	John Morris Rea (Note: On August 25, 1895, John Morris Rea died causing a vacancy.)	Rep	Elbert Marion Sargent	Rep	Rep Hold
39th	George M. Craig	Rep	George M. Craig	Rep	Rep Hold
40th	Leslie B. Mattoon	Dem	James Henry Trewin	Rep	Rep Gain
41st	Charles Fred Jewett	Rep	Gilbert S. Gilbertson	Rep	Rep Hold
43rd	Norman Vaughan Brower	Rep	William F. Harriman	Rep	Rep Hold
46th	William Hamilton Dent	Dem	Alva C. Hobart	Rep	Rep Gain
47th	Abraham B. Funk	Rep	Abraham B. Funk	Rep	Rep Hold
49th	Luther H. Bishop	Dem	Henry Hospers	Rep	Rep Gain

== Detailed Results ==
- NOTE: The Iowa Official Register does not contain detailed vote totals for state senate elections in 1895.

== See also ==
- Elections in Iowa
