= Hanchett =

Hanchett is a surname. Notable people with the surname include:

- Lani Hanchett (1919–1975), American Episcopal bishop
- Lewis Hanchett (1843–1892), American politician from Iowa
- Luther Hanchett (1825–1862), American politician from Wisconsin
- Mary Hunt (née Hanchett, 1830–1906), American activist
