= 1897 Iowa Senate election =

- November 2, 1897

21 out of 50 seats in the Iowa State Senate 26 seats needed for a majority
	Majority party	Minority party
Party	Republican	Democratic
Last election	43	7
Seats after	39	11
Seat change	▼4	▲4

In the 1897 Iowa State Senate elections Iowa voters elected state senators to serve in the twenty-seventh Iowa General Assembly. Elections were held in 21 of the state senate's 50 districts. State senators serve four-year terms in the Iowa State Senate.

A statewide map of the 50 state Senate districts in the 1897 elections is provided by the Iowa General Assembly here.

The 1897 elections occurred before primary elections were established in Iowa by the Primary Election Law in 1907. The general election took place on November 2, 1897.

Following the previous election, Republicans had control of the Iowa Senate with 43 seats to Democrats' 7 seats.

To claim control of the chamber from Republicans, the Democrats needed to net 19 Senate seats.

Republicans maintained control of the Iowa State Senate following the 1897 general election with the balance of power shifting to Republicans holding 39 seats and Democrats having 11 seats (a net gain of 4 seats for Democrats).

== Summary of Results ==
- Note: The holdover Senators not up for re-election are not listed on this table.

Senate District	Incumbent	Party	Elected Senator	Party	Outcome
1st	John Downey	Dem	David Arthur Young	Dem	Dem Hold
7th	William Eaton	Rep	William Eaton	Rep	Rep Hold
9th	Thomas G. Harper	Dem	William Corse McArthur	Rep	Rep Gain
10th	David James Palmer	Rep	David James Palmer	Rep	Rep Hold
12th	John A. Riggen	Rep	William Robinson Lewis	Rep	Rep Hold
13th	Harrison Lyman Waterman	Rep	William Anderson McIntire	Dem	Dem Gain
18th	Julian Phelps	Rep	Joseph Martin Emmert	Dem	Dem Gain
20th	Charles Albert Carpenter	Rep	George Marion Titus	Rep	Rep Hold
21st	Charles G. Hipwell	Dem	William C. Hayward	Rep	Rep Gain
22nd	Lyman A. Ellis	Rep	John Lowry Wilson	Dem	Dem Gain
29th	Joseph R. Gorrell	Rep	Joseph R. Gorrell (Note: Senator Gorrell was elected to the senate from the twenty-ninth district in 1893 as a Republican. He was then re-elected in 1897 on the Democratic ticket.)	Dem	Dem Gain
30th	Thomas Abbott Cheshire	Rep	Thomas Abbott Cheshire	Rep	Rep Hold
34th	Rudolph C. H. Lehfeldt	Rep	Lemuel Rose Bolter	Dem	Dem Gain
35th	Robert Bonson	Dem	Francis Edward Malloy (Note: On January 31, 1899, Malloy died during his term.)	Dem	Dem Hold
37th	John English Rowen	Rep	Joseph Wallace	Rep	Rep Hold
38th	Elbert Marion Sargent	Rep	Charles W. Mullan	Rep	Rep Hold
42nd	Clark C. Upton	Rep	Dennis Aloysius Lyons	Dem	Dem Gain
44th	William Burton Perrin	Rep	William Burton Perrin	Rep	Rep Hold
45th	Emlen G. Penrose	Rep	Emlen G. Penrose	Rep	Rep Hold
48th	Warren Garst	Rep	Warren Garst	Rep	Rep Hold
50th	George W. Henderson	Rep	Parley Finch	Rep	Rep Hold

== Detailed Results ==
- NOTE: The Iowa Official Register does not contain detailed vote totals for state senate elections in 1897.

== See also ==
- Elections in Iowa
