= Edward Cassatt =

Edward Cassatt may refer to:

- Edward B. Cassatt (1869–1922), American soldier and racehorse breeder
- Edward R. Cassatt (1839–1907), American politician from Iowa
