= Nathaniel Cobb and Lucetia Baily Deering House =

Historic house in Iowa, United States

- Nathaniel Cobb and Lucretia Baily Deering House
- U.S. National Register of Historic Places
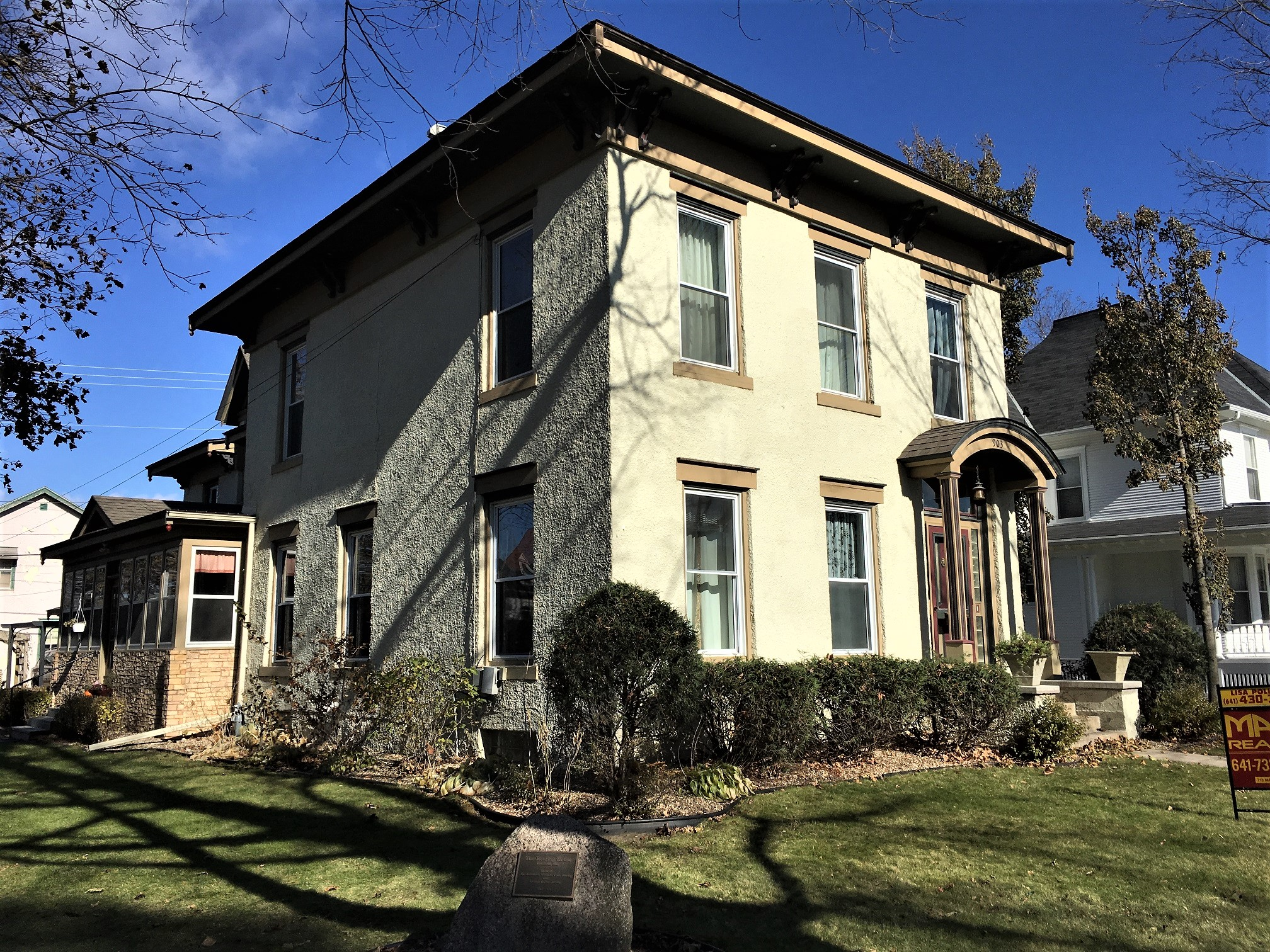

- Location within Iowa Location within the United States
- Location: 903 State St. Osage, Iowa
- Coordinates: 43°16′59″N 92°48′27″W
- Area: less than one acre
- Built: 1862
- Architectural style: Late Victorian
- NRHP reference No.: 00001678
- Added to NRHP: January 26, 2001

The Nathaniel Cobb and Lucretia Baily Deering House is a historic building located in Osage, Iowa, United States. The house served as the residence for a prominent politician. Nathaniel Cobb Deering, for whom this house was named, was involved in a variety of pursuits from his native Maine to the California Gold Rush to his adoptive state of Iowa. A Republican, he represented Iowa's 4th congressional district in the United States House of Representatives. He was friends with Hannibal Hamlin, who served as Abraham Lincoln's first term Vice-President, from the time they served together in the Maine House of Representatives. Hamlin reportedly visited Deering here in Osage. The front two-story portion of the brick house built in 1862, and Deering had the back 1½-story section built in 1867. He died here in 1887, and his second wife, Lucetia, died here in 1919. The house was listed on the National Register of Historic Places in 2001.
