= Herriottsville, Pennsylvania =

Unincorporated community in Pennsylvania, U.S.

Coordinates: 41.20332°N 77.19452°W

Herriottsville is an unincorporated community in South Fayette Township, Allegheny County, Pennsylvania, United States. The community is located in the southeast corner of the township near Chartiers Run. Herriottsville had one of the first post offices in South Fayette Township and was a stagecoach stop on the Black Horse Trail.

== Notable people ==
- John Herriott, Lieutenant Governor of Iowa
