= William Gustavus Kent =

American politician (1837–1905)

William Gustavus Kent (1837–1905) was an American politician.

Kent was born in Bellefonte, Pennsylvania, on 10 August 1837. Shortly thereafter, his family moved to Fort Madison, Iowa, where he was educated and performed farm work. At the age of eighteen, Kent became a schoolteacher. During his eight-year teaching career, Kent also served as principal of Fort Madison City Schools and attended Denmark Academy in Denmark, Iowa. After completing his studies at Denmark Academy, Kent began the first of two terms as Lee County superintendent of schools in 1867. He rejected the offer of a third term in that role. In 1888, Kent aided the establishment of the Lee County Savings Bank and was appointed the institution's director and vice president.

Politically, Kent was affiliated with the Democratic Party. He was a member of the Iowa House of Representatives from District 1 between 1886 and 1888. Kent resigned as a state representative to contest the 1887 Iowa Senate election and won the District 1 seat vacated by Joseph M. Casey, who had resigned. After completing Casey's term, Kent contested the 1889 Iowa Senate election and won a four-year term on the Iowa Senate in his own right. During his tenure as a state legislator, Kent was a member of gubernatorial commissions convened by William Larrabee and Horace Boies. In 1892, Kent lost an election for a position on the Iowa railroad commission. In 1894, governor Frank D. Jackson named Kent to the commission that planned the Cherokee Mental Health Institute, which opened in 1902.

Kent married Sarah E. Shepherd in December 1863 and died in 1905.
