= Nathaniel Cobb Deering =

American politician (1827–1887)

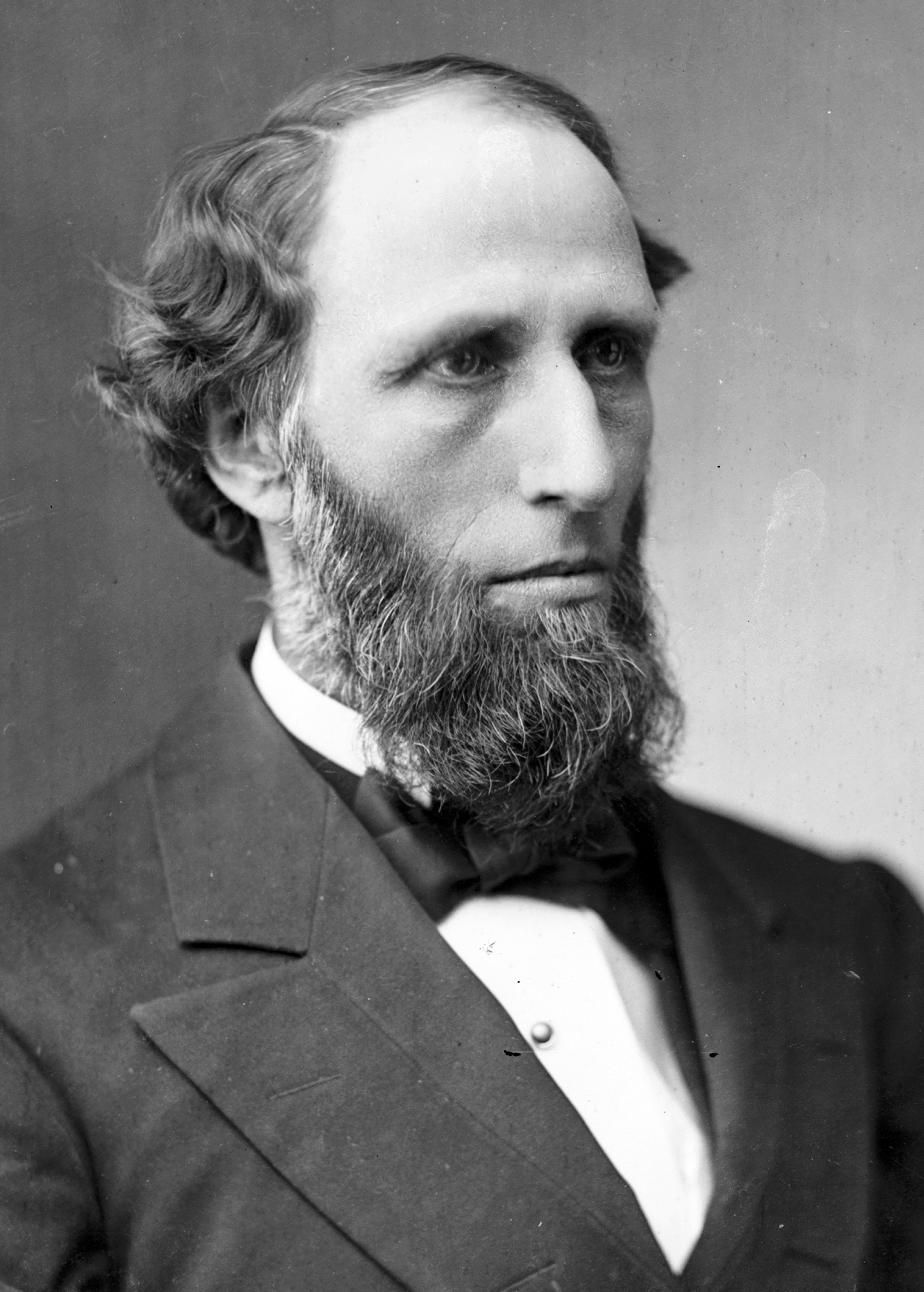

Member of the U.S. House of Representatives from Iowa's 4th district
- In office March 4, 1877 – March 3, 1883
- Preceded by: Henry O. Pratt
- Succeeded by: Luman H. Weller

Personal details
- Born: September 2, 1827 Denmark, Maine, U.S.
- Died: December 11, 1887 (aged 60) Osage, Iowa, U.S.
- Resting place: Osage Cemetery
- Party: Republican

Nathaniel Cobb Deering (September 2, 1827 – December 11, 1887) was a three-term Republican U.S. Representative from Iowa's 4th congressional district, then in northeastern Iowa.

Born in Denmark, Maine to James and Elizabeth Prentiss Deering, Nathanial Deering attended the common schools. He graduated from North Bridgeton Academy. After teaching school and working as a store clerk, he left to participate in the California Gold Rush in 1850, returning after two years with a "considerable fortune." He used his newfound wealth to enter the paper manufacturing business but that business was destroyed by fire in 1856. Meanwhile, he served as member of the Maine House of Representatives from Penobscot County in 1855 and 1856. He moved to Iowa, and settled in Osage, in Mitchell County, in 1857. He engaged in the lumber business and built and operated a sawmill.

For several years he served as a clerk in the United States Senate as a result of his connection to then-Vice President Hannibal Hamlin, but resigned in 1865. He served as special agent of the Post Office Department for the districts of Minnesota, Iowa, and Nebraska from 1865 to 1869, when he resigned. From 1872 to 1877, he served as a national-bank examiner for the State of Iowa.

In 1876, Deering was elected as a Republican to represent Iowa's 4th congressional district in the 45th United States Congress. He was re-elected twice, serving in the Forty-sixth. and Forty-seventh Congresses. He served as chairman of the Committee on Expenditures in the Department of State (in the Forty-seventh Congress).

In 1881, the congressional districts in Iowa were reapportioned to accommodate the addition of two new districts. In northeastern Iowa, Deering's home county and the home county of third district representative Thomas Updegraff were included in the reconfigured fourth district. Updegraff ran for the Republican nomination for the seat, but in May 1882, Deering announced that he would not be a candidate. In all, Deering served in Congress from March 4, 1877 to March 3, 1883.

Returning to Iowa, Deering engaged in agricultural pursuits. He was also interested in cattle raising in Montana, and at the time of his death served as president of a large cattle company in that territory.

He died in Osage on December 11, 1887, while suffering from malaria. He was interred in Osage Cemetery.

U.S. House of Representatives
Preceded by Henry O. Pratt	Member of the U.S. House of Representatives from Iowa's 4th congressional district 1877–1883	Succeeded by Luman H. Weller
