= William O. Mitchell =

American lawyer and politician (1846–1930)

William O. Mitchell (April 4, 1846 – July 29, 1930) was an American politician.

== Early life and military service ==
William Mitchell was born on April 4, 1846, in Bonaparte, Iowa, to settlers of Van Buren County, George and Sarah Mitchell. After the American Civil War broke out, Mitchell enlisted in Company C of the 13th Iowa Infantry Regiment. Mitchell saw action at the Siege of Vicksburg, during the Meridian campaign, and was captured at the Battle of Atlanta. He was held at Andersonville Prison, the Florence Stockade, and the Salisbury Prison. Mitchell's release was secured near the end of the war, and he was mustered out of service with the 18th Iowa on July 21, 1865.

== Education and political career ==
Upon his return to Iowa, Mitchelled enrolled at Cornell College for six years, graduating in 1871, then studied law with the Stuart Brothers firm in Chariton for one year before starting his own practice. Mitchell also farmed, and was president of the Southwestern Iowa Blue Grass League. His 1891 election to the Iowa House of Representatives as a Republican ended longstanding Democratic dominance of the House District 13. In his first term as state representative, Mitchell additionally served as Speaker of the House. After winning reelection to the state house in 1893, Mitchell won the District 6 seat in the 1895 Iowa Senate election. Mitchell left the Iowa Senate upon completing his four-year term in 1900.

== Later life ==
In retirement, Michell and his wife moved to Oklahoma City. Around 1927, Mitchell relocated to New York City to improve his wife's health and be nearer to one of his daughters. He was injured in a car accident, and died on July 29, 1930, following a heart attack.
