= Walter H. Butler =

American politician (1852–1931)

Walter Halben Butler
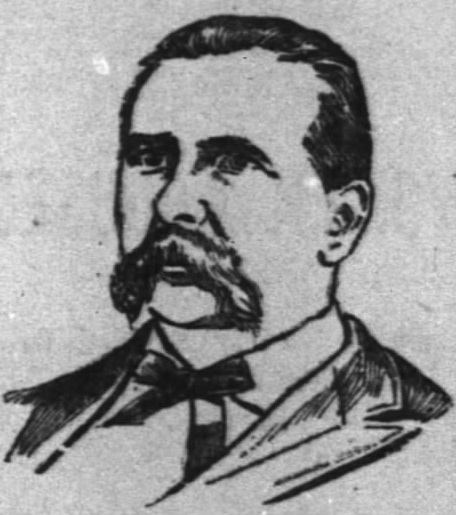
- Louisville Courier-Journal, December 31, 1894

Member of the U.S. House of Representatives from Iowa's 4th district
- In office March 4, 1891 – March 3, 1893
- Preceded by: Joseph H. Sweney
- Succeeded by: Thomas Updegraff

Personal details
- Born: February 13, 1852 Springboro, Pennsylvania, U.S.
- Died: April 24, 1931 (aged 79) Kansas City, Missouri, U.S.
- Resting place: Forest Hill Calvary Cemetery; Kansas City, Missouri, U.S.
- Party: Democratic

Walter Halben Butler (February 13, 1852 – April 24, 1931) was a lawyer, teacher, newspaper publisher, and one-term Democratic U.S. Representative from Iowa's 4th congressional district, then located in northeastern Iowa.

== Biography ==
Born in Springboro, Pennsylvania, on February 13, 1852, Butler moved to Minnesota in 1868 with his parents, who settled in Mankato, in Blue Earth County. He attended public and private schools, and graduated from the University of Wisconsin–Madison in 1875. He was a wrestler and sprinter there, and is credited as the first to run the 100-yard dash in 10 seconds.

After studying law, he was admitted to the bar in 1875 and commenced practice in Princeton, Wisconsin. He moved to Iowa in 1876 and taught school at La Porte City until 1878, and at Manchester until 1880.

He moved to West Union, Iowa, in 1883 and became owner and publisher of the Fayette County Union. From 1885 to 1889, he served as superintendent of the Railway Mail Service's tenth division, at St. Paul, Minnesota. He returned to West Union, and resumed his former newspaper pursuits.

In 1890, Butler was nominated as a Democrat to run against incumbent Republican U.S. House Representative Joseph Henry Sweney from the 4th congressional district. After defeating Sweney in the general election as part of a Democratic landslide, he served in the Fifty-second Congress. In 1892 he was defeated in his first re-election bid, by former Republican Congressman Thomas Updegraff. Butler served in Congress from March 4, 1891 to March 3, 1893.

After leaving Congress, he returned to northeastern Iowa for five years. He moved to Des Moines, Iowa, in 1897 and to Kansas City, Missouri, in 1907. He engaged in the real estate and loan business and, later in banking. He died in Kansas City on April 24, 1931. He was interred at Forest Hill Calvary Cemetery in Kansas City.

== Sources ==
=== Books ===
- Gue, Benjamin F. (1903). History of Iowa. Vol. IV, Iowa Biography. New York, NY: The century History Company.
- Onofrio, Jan (2000). Iowa Biographical Dictionary. St. Clair Shores, MI: Somerset Publishers, Inc. ISBN 978-0-403-09304-5.

Preceded by Joseph H. Sweney	Member of the U.S. House of Representatives from Iowa's 4th congressional district 1891–1893	Succeeded by Thomas Updegraff
