= William E. Fuller =

American politician (1846–1918)

William Fuller
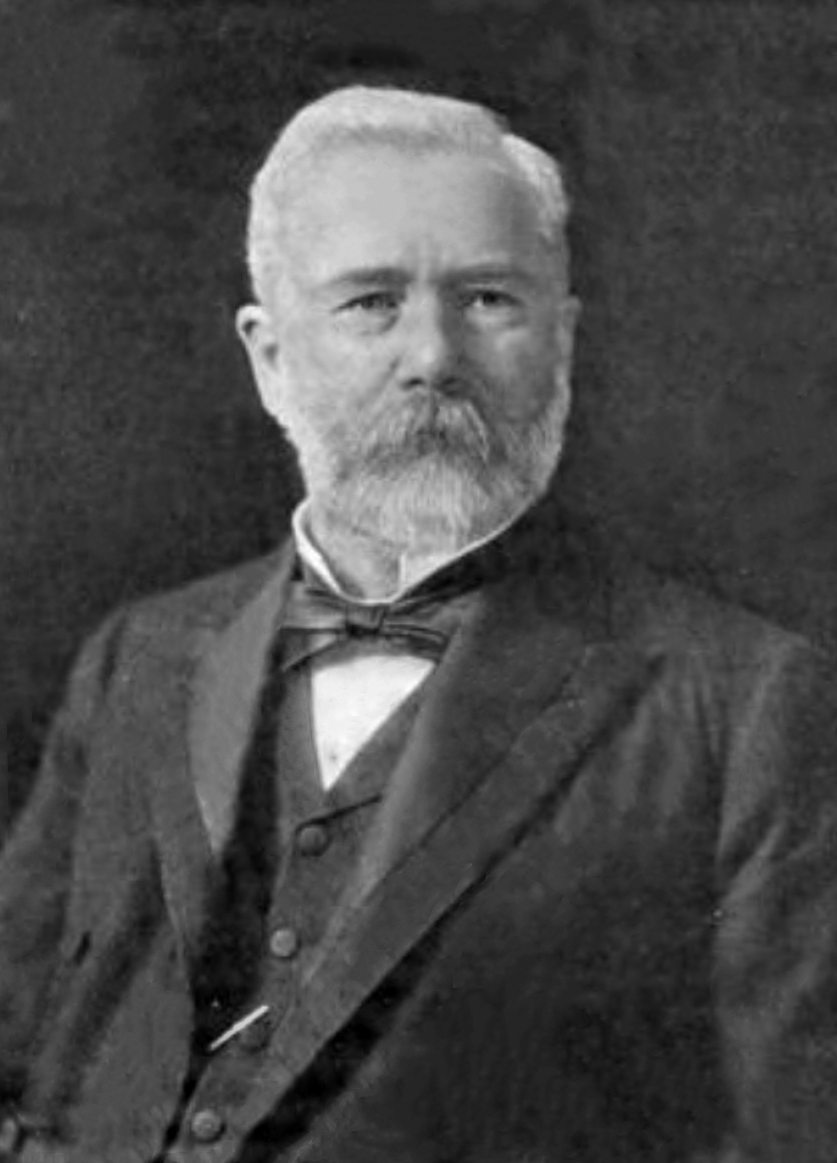

Member of the U.S. House of Representatives from Iowa's 4th district
- In office March 4, 1885 – March 3, 1889
- Preceded by: Luman H. Weller
- Succeeded by: Joseph H. Sweney

Personal details
- Born: March 30, 1846 Howard, Pennsylvania, U.S.
- Died: April 23, 1918 (aged 72) Washington, D.C., U.S
- Party: Republican

William Elijah Fuller (March 30, 1846 – April 23, 1918), was an attorney, and a two-term Republican U.S. Representative from Iowa's 4th congressional district in northeastern Iowa during the 1880s.

Born in Howard, Pennsylvania, Fuller moved with his parents to West Union, Iowa, in 1853. He attended the common schools, and the Upper Iowa University at nearby Fayette. In 1866 and 1867, he held a position in the Office of Indian Affairs of the United States Department of the Interior. He then attended the University of Iowa College of Law at Iowa City, where he received his law degree in June 1870. He was admitted to the bar the same year and commenced practice in West Union.

He served as member of the West Union Board of Education for six years. In 1876 and 1877 he served as member of the Iowa House of Representatives. He also served as member of the Republican state and congressional district committees.

In 1884 Fuller ran as a Republican to represent Iowa's 4th congressional district in the U.S. House. After winning the Republican nomination, he defeated incumbent Greenback Party Congressman Luman Hamlin Weller, who had become known in Washington as "Calamity" Weller. After serving one term in the 49th United States Congress, Fuller won the customary re-election that the district gave to incumbents, and served in the 50th United States Congress. However, in 1888 he found himself beaten for renomination by state senator Joseph H. Sweney, who had been spoken of as a possible candidate two years before. In all he served in Congress from March 4, 1885 to March 3, 1889.

Fuller's House service was respectable enough, but undistinguished. On the old war issues and on pensions for veterans, he voted as Republicans wanted. He offered bills to refund the direct tax of 1861 imposed on the states and to donate a condemned cannon to the GAR post back home in West Union. He supported a tax on oleomargarine.

Starting in 1901 he served as an assistant attorney general with the Spanish Treaty Claims Commission until 1907. Afterwards he returned to the practice of law until his death in Washington, D.C., on April 23, 1918. He was interred in West Union Cemetery.

U.S. House of Representatives
Preceded by Luman H. Weller	U.S. House of Representatives, 4th Iowa District; 1885–1889	Succeeded by Joseph H. Sweney
