= Mike Kelley =

Mike or Michael Kelley may refer to:

- Mike Kelley (artist) (1954–2012), American artist
- Mike Kelley (baseball) (1875–1955), American baseball player and manager
- Mike Kelley (quarterback) (born 1959), American football quarterback
- Mike Kelley (offensive lineman) (born 1962), American football offensive lineman
- Mike Kelley (writer) (born 1967), TV writer and producer
- Mike Kelley (Missouri politician) (born 1975), member of the Missouri House of Representatives
- Mike Kelley (Oklahoma politician), member of the Oklahoma House of Representatives
- Mikey Kelley (born 1973), voice of Ratchet in the Ratchet and Clank video game series
- Michael Kelley, candidate in the 2008 United States House of Representatives elections in Kentucky

== See also ==
- Mike Kellie (1947–2017), English musician, composer and record producer
- Michael Kelly (disambiguation)
