= John Herriott =

American politician and lawyer

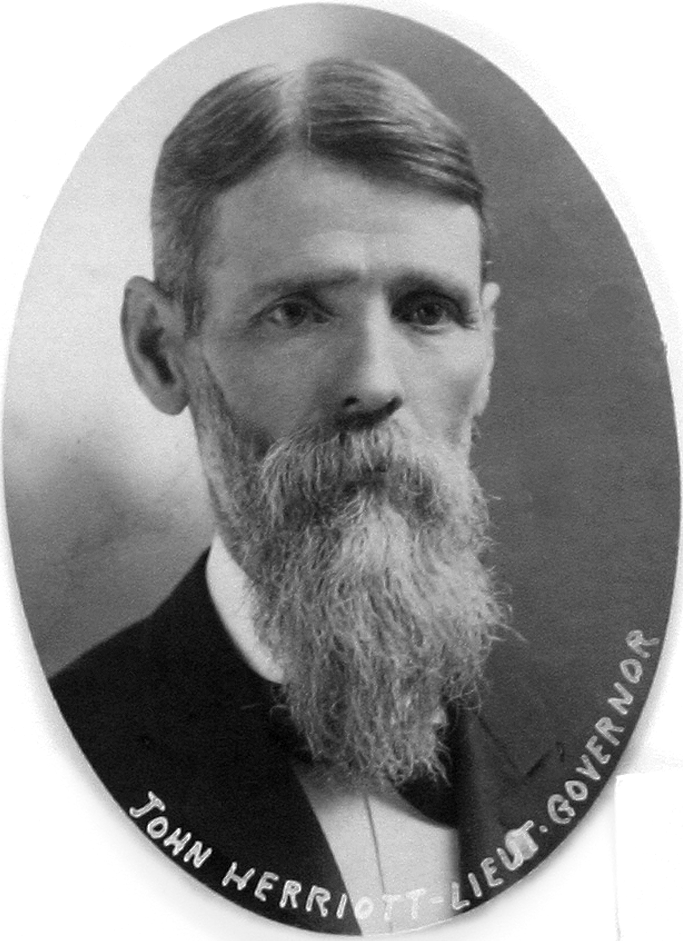

19th Lieutenant Governor of Iowa
- In office January 13, 1902 – January 13, 1907
- Governor: Albert B. Cummins
- Preceded by: James C. Milliman
- Succeeded by: Warren Garst

12th Treasurer of Iowa
- In office 1895–1901
- Governor: Francis M. Drake; Leslie M. Shaw
- Preceded by: Byron A. Beeson
- Succeeded by: Gilbert S. Gilbertson

Personal details
- Born: October 20, 1844 Herriottsville, Pennsylvania
- Died: September 24, 1918 (aged 73) Des Moines, Iowa
- Party: Republican
- Spouse: Nellie M. Herriott

Military service
- Allegiance: United States
- Branch/service: U.S. Army (Union Army)
- Years of service: 1861–1864
- Unit: 1st Pennsylvania Cavalry Regiment
- Battles/wars: American Civil War

John Herriott (October 20, 1844 – September 24, 1918) was an American politician and lawyer who served as a Lieutenant Governor from Iowa.

== Life ==
Born in Herriottsville, Pennsylvania, in Allegheny County, Pennsylvania, Herriott served in the Union Army during the American Civil War as a member of the 1st Pennsylvania Cavalry Regiment and participated in the Battles of Fredericksburg and Gettysburg.

Herriott moved to Iowa, where he served leader of the Guthrie County Republican Party and as Iowa State Treasurer and then Lieutenant Governor of Iowa from 1902 until 1907, serving under Governor Albert B. Cummins. In 1901 he ran for the Republican nomination for governor of Iowa and came second to last with only 8 delegates against Cummins 860, however he won the Lieutenant Governor nomination after two ballots.

On September 24, 1918, he died in Des Moines, Iowa. His son was Frank Irving Herriott.

Political offices
Preceded by Byron A. Beeson	Iowa State Treasurer; 1895–1901	Succeeded by Gilbert S. Gilbertson
Preceded by James C. Milliman	Lieutenant Governor of Iowa; 1902–1907	Succeeded by Warren Garst
