= James C. Milliman =

American politician (1847–1933)

James Milliman

Mayor of Logan
- In office 1902–1906
- Preceded by: L. W. Fallon
- Succeeded by: W. H. Johnson
- In office 1912–1916
- Preceded by: C. A. Bolter
- Succeeded by: O. L. Case

18th Lieutenant Governor of Iowa
- In office 1898-1902
- Governor: Leslie M. Shaw
- Preceded by: Matt Parrott
- Succeeded by: John Herriott

Member of the Iowa House of Representatives
- In office January 8, 1894 – January 12, 1896
- Constituency: 32nd District

Personal details
- Born: January 28, 1847 Saratoga County, New York
- Died: January 21, 1933 (aged 85) Santa Monica, California

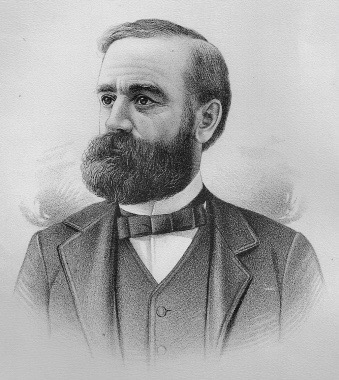
James C. Milliman

James Cutler Milliman (January 28, 1847 – January 21, 1933) was an American politician.

Born in Saratoga County, New York, Milliman served in the Union Army during the American Civil War. He then moved to Logan, Iowa where he worked in real estate. Milliman served in the Iowa House of Representatives from 1894 to 1896 and as Lieutenant Governor of Iowa, serving from 1898 until 1902. Later, he served as Mayor of Logan, Iowa from 1902 to 1915. He died in Santa Monica, California.

Political offices
| Preceded by Matt Parrott | Lieutenant Governor of Iowa; 1898–1902 | Succeeded by John Herriott |
