= Frank I. Herriott =

Frank Irving Herriott (October 19, 1868 – September 14, 1941) was an academic and educator from the U.S. state of Iowa.

== Early life and education ==
Herriott was born in New Liberty, Scott County, Iowa, on October 19, 1868, to John (who served as Lieutenant Governor of Iowa) and Nellie M. Herriott. He attended high school in Stuart, Iowa. Herriott received a Bachelor of Arts degree in 1890 and a Master of Arts degree in 1893, both from Grinnell College, and a Doctor of Philosophy degree from Johns Hopkins University in 1893.

== Career ==
Herriot served as acting professor of political science at Grinnell from 1895 until 1898; he was deputy state treasurer from 1897 until 1901. He became a professor at Drake University in 1903 and remained there until his death, teaching classes in political science, economics, and sociology. From 1903 until 1916, he also worked as a statistician for the Iowa Board of Control. He wrote on a wide variety of topics, including taxes, the state budget, Sir William Temple, and Abraham Lincoln; Johnson Brigham wrote in 1918 that "[i]f we have any typical, well-rounded Iowa authors he is one of them". Herriott was an expert on Iowa history, and an obituary characterized him as a "recognized authority" on the life of Lincoln, particularly his election and his ascent to nationwide prominence.

== Personal life ==
Herriott and Mary Haines wed in 1896; they had five children. Herriott was a member of the American Society of International Law and Phi Beta Kappa, and he was a director of the Municipal Research Bureau of Iowa and the Des Moines Bureau of Municipal Research. He was a member of the executive committee of the Associated Charities of Des Moines and manager of the Iowa Children's Home's board. Herriott drafted proposed legislation to require municipalities to publish information about their financial accounts; it was passed by the Iowa Legislature in 1906.

== Death and legacy ==
Herriott died suddenly of peritonitis on September 14, 1941. Henry G. Harmon, the president of Drake University, stated that "[t]he loss to the city of Des Moines and the university is very genuine, and one that cannot be calculated". The Iowa Children's Home established an educational fund in his honor, and in 1958, a newly constructed dormitory at Drake University was named for him. According to an obituary in The Christian Century, "[f]ew educators have had a more direct effect on political policies of the state and its municipalities, especially in relation to taxation questions".
