= Henry Otis Pratt =

American politician (1838–1931)

Henry Pratt
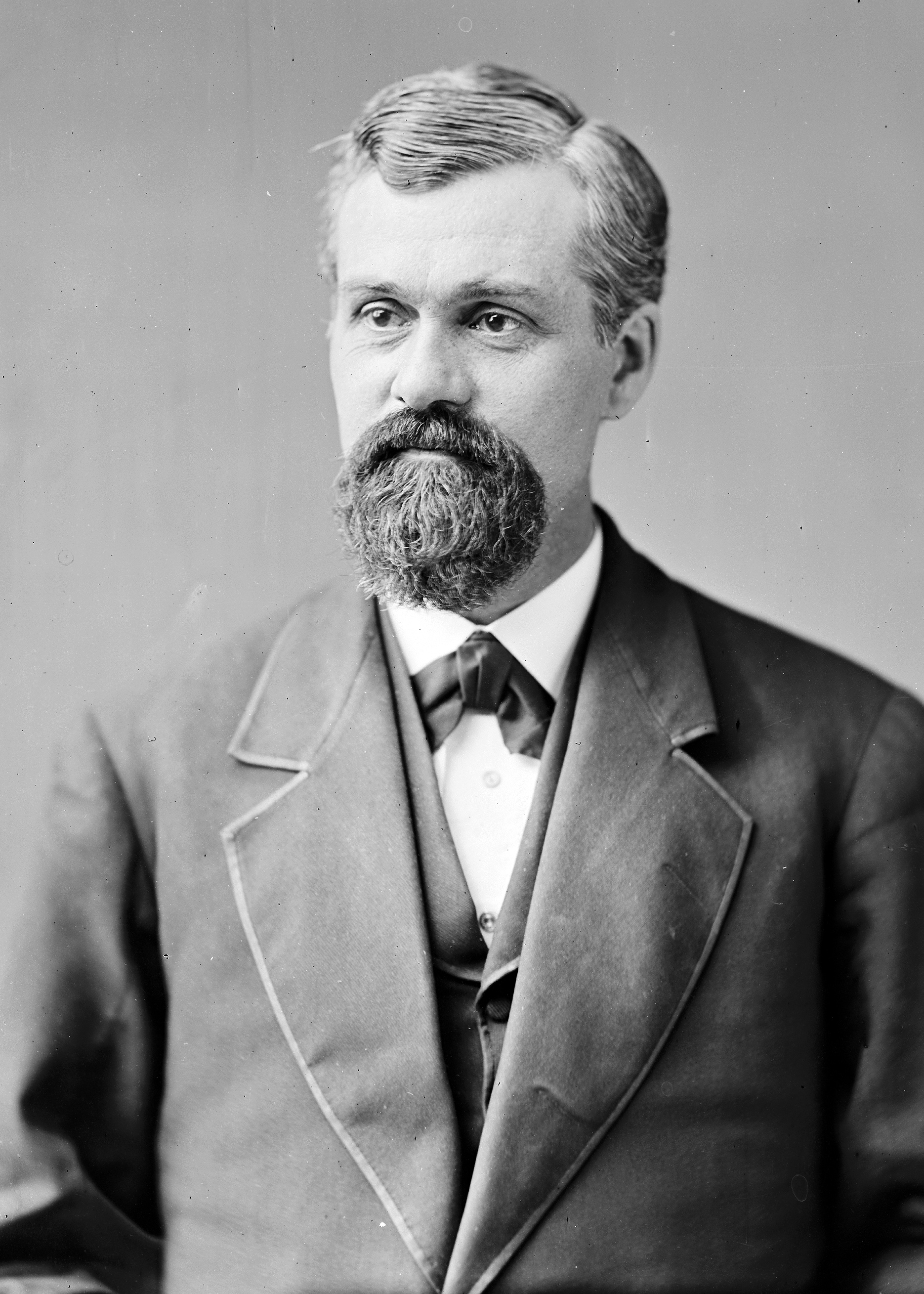

Member of the U.S. House of Representatives from Iowa's 4th district
- In office March 4, 1873 – March 3, 1877
- Preceded by: Madison M. Walden
- Succeeded by: Nathaniel C. Deering

Member of the Iowa House of Representatives
- In office 1870–1872

Personal details
- Born: Henry Otis Pratt; February 11, 1838 Dover-Foxcroft, Maine, U.S.
- Died: May 22, 1931 (aged 93) Cedar Rapids, Iowa, U.S.
- Party: Republican
- Education: Harvard University (LLB)

Military service
- Branch/service: Union Army
- Unit: 37th Iowa Infantry Regiment

Henry Otis Pratt (February 11, 1838 – May 22, 1931) was an American lawyer, Methodist Episcopal minister, and two-term Republican U.S. representative from Iowa's 4th congressional district.

== Early life and education ==
Born in Dover-Foxcroft, Maine, Pratt attended the common schools and Foxcroft Academy. He later graduated from Harvard Law School.

== Career ==
After graduating from law school, Pratt moved to Charles City, Iowa, in 1862 and taught school. He was admitted to the bar in Mason City, Iowa, in 1862, but his commencement of practice was delayed by the Civil War.

He enlisted in the Union Army in August 1862 and served in Company B of the 37th Iowa Infantry Regiment, until March 1863, when he was discharged at Fort Pillow in Henning, Tennessee due to the measles. He commenced the practice of law in Charles City, Iowa, in 1864. He was a captain. He was the county superintendent of public schools of Floyd County, Iowa in 1868 and 1869. He served one term as a member of the Iowa House of Representatives from 1870 to 1872.

In 1872, Pratt was elected as a Republican to represent Iowa's 4th congressional district in the 43rd United States Congress. He was re-elected two years later, and served in the 44th United States Congress. He was not a candidate for renomination in 1876. He served in Congress from March 4, 1873 to March 3, 1877.

Returning to Iowa, he served as president of the 1877 Republican State Convention. After studying for the ministry, he was ordained and entered the ministry of the Methodist Episcopal Church in October 1877. He continued his ministerial duties until retired on account of age in October 1918.

== Death ==
He died in Cedar Rapids, Iowa, on May 22, 1931. He was interred in Oak Hill Cemetery.

U.S. House of Representatives
| Preceded by Madison M. Walden | U.S. House of Representatives, 4th Iowa District; 1873–1877 | Succeeded by Nathaniel C. Deering |
