= List of mayors of Waterloo, Iowa =

Mayor of Waterloo, Iowa
- Incumbent; Dave Boesen since January 1, 2026
- City Government of Waterloo
- Term length: 2 years
- Inaugural holder: Romaine Adrian Whitaker
- Formation: 1868
- Salary: $94,000 (in 2020)
- Website: Official website

The mayor of Waterloo, Iowa is the chief executive of city government in Waterloo, Iowa, and chief executive officer of the city and presiding officer of its city council. In addition, the mayor is tasked with supervising various city officers and departments, being the chief operations officer for over 500 city employees, and representing the city ceremonially.

Waterloo holds mayoral elections every two years, in years ending in odd numbers. The current mayor is Dave Boesen, who was elected to succeed Quentin Hart in the 2025 city elections. He was inaugurated as mayor in January 2026.

The following is a list of mayors of the city of Waterloo, Iowa, United States.

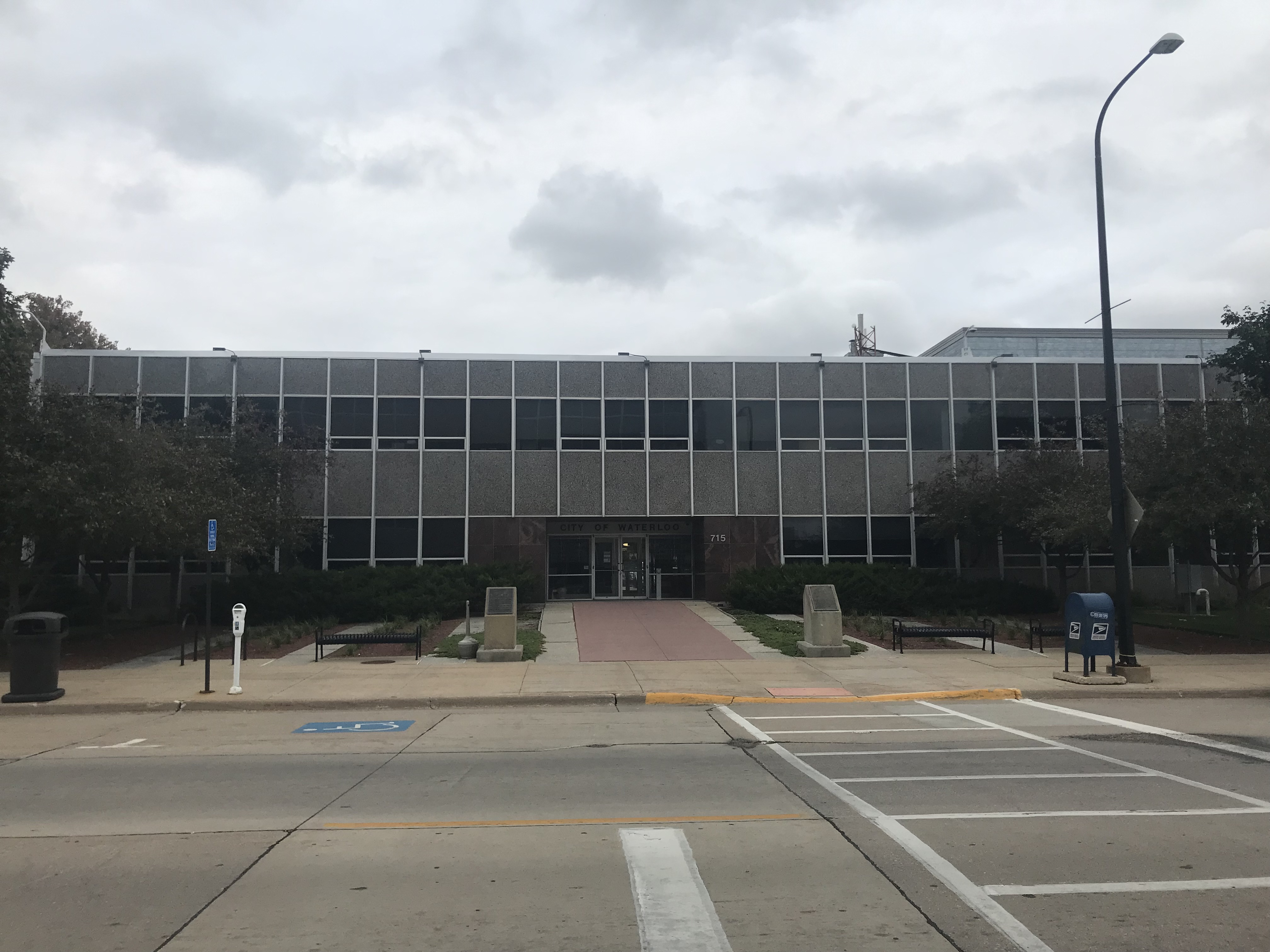
City hall building in Waterloo, Iowa; built in 1965 (photo 2022)

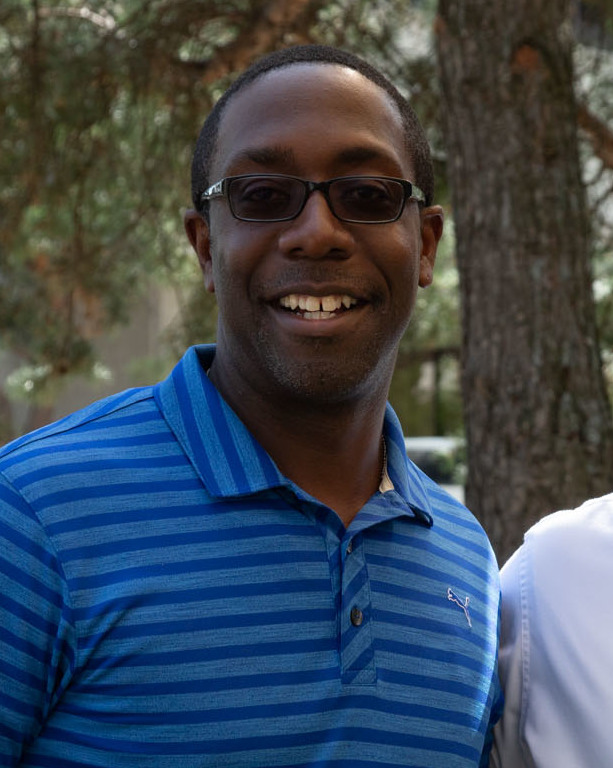
Quentin Hart, serving from 2016 to 2025, was the city's first black mayor

- Romaine Adrian Whitaker, 1868-1873
- Lewis Lichty, 1873-1877, 1882-1885
- Matt Parrott, 1877-1880
- Joseph Hay Kuhns, 1880-1882, 1885-1889
- Samuel J. Hoot, 1889-1893
- James M. Groat, 1893-1899
- John W. Krapfel, 1899-1901
- Philo J. Martin, 1901-1906
- John R. Rector, 1906-1908, 1910-1912
- Roy Archer Doty, 1908-1910
- Rea C. Thompson, 1912-1916, 1918-1919
- William Richard "Bob" Law, 1916-1917
- Thomas E. Leeper, 1919-1920
- Nelson Woodruff Frisbie, 1920-1921
- Stephen D. Brown, 1921-1922
- Andrew Earl Gnagy, c.1922-1926
- Glenn A. Tibbitts, c.1926-1929
- Dr. Edward E. Peek, c.1929-1930
- Melanthon J. Morgan, c.1930-1936
- Ralph B. Slippy, c.1936-1946
- Stanley B. Shane, c.1946
- Knapp F. Matthews, c.1946-1947
- Robert R. Buckmaster, c.1947-1948
- William Bailey Barnes, c.1948-1950
- Lawrence A. "Pat" Touchae, c.1950-1956
- Glenn S. Stech, c.1956-1958
- Ed Jochumsen, c.1958-1965
- Lloyd L. Turner, c.1966-1973
- Leo P. Rooff, c.1974-1983
- Delman "Del" Bowers, c.1984-1985
- Bernard (Bernie) L. McKinley, c.1986-1991
- Albert (Al) C. Manning Jr., c.1992-1993
- John R. Rooff III, 1994-2003
- Timothy J. Hurley, 2004-2009
- Buck Clark, 2010-2015
- Quentin M. Hart, 2016-2025
- Dave Boesen, 2026-present

== See also ==
- Waterloo history
