= Thomas Updegraff =

American politician (1834–1910)

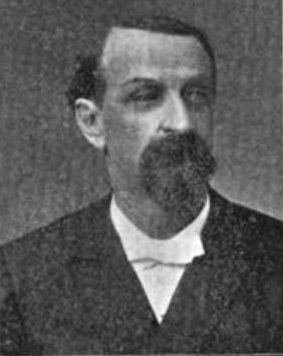

Member of the U.S. House of Representatives from Iowa's 3rd district
- In office March 4, 1879 – March 3, 1883
- Preceded by: Theodore W. Burdick
- Succeeded by: David B. Henderson

Personal details
- Born: April 3, 1834 Tioga County, Pennsylvania, U.S.
- Died: October 4, 1910 (aged 76) McGregor, Iowa, U.S
- Party: Republican
- Education: University of Notre Dame

Thomas Updegraff (April 3, 1834 – October 4, 1910) was an American attorney, politician, and five-term Republican member of the U.S. House of Representatives from northeastern Iowa. His two periods of service were separated by ten years out of Congress.

== Biography ==
=== Family background ===
Thomas Updegraff, a descendant of the Dutch and German Op den Graeff family, was born in Tioga County, Pennsylvania. He was a son of William Updegraff (1798-1846) and his wife Rachel Smith (1800-1869) and grandson of Thomas Updegraff (York County, Province of Pennsylvania, 1774-Williamsport, Lycoming County, Pennsylvania, 1857), Quaker, Businessman, and agent for the Underground Railroad Station. His great-grandfather Abraham Updegraff (1746-1781) served as a private in the Pennsylvania Militia in 1760. Through Abrahams father Herman Updegraff (1711-1758) and grandfather Isaac Updegraff (1680-1745) they were direct descendants of Abraham op den Graeff (father of Isaac), one of the founders of Germantown and in 1688 signer of the first protest against slavery in colonial America and of his grandfather Herman op den Graeff, mennonite leader of Krefeld.

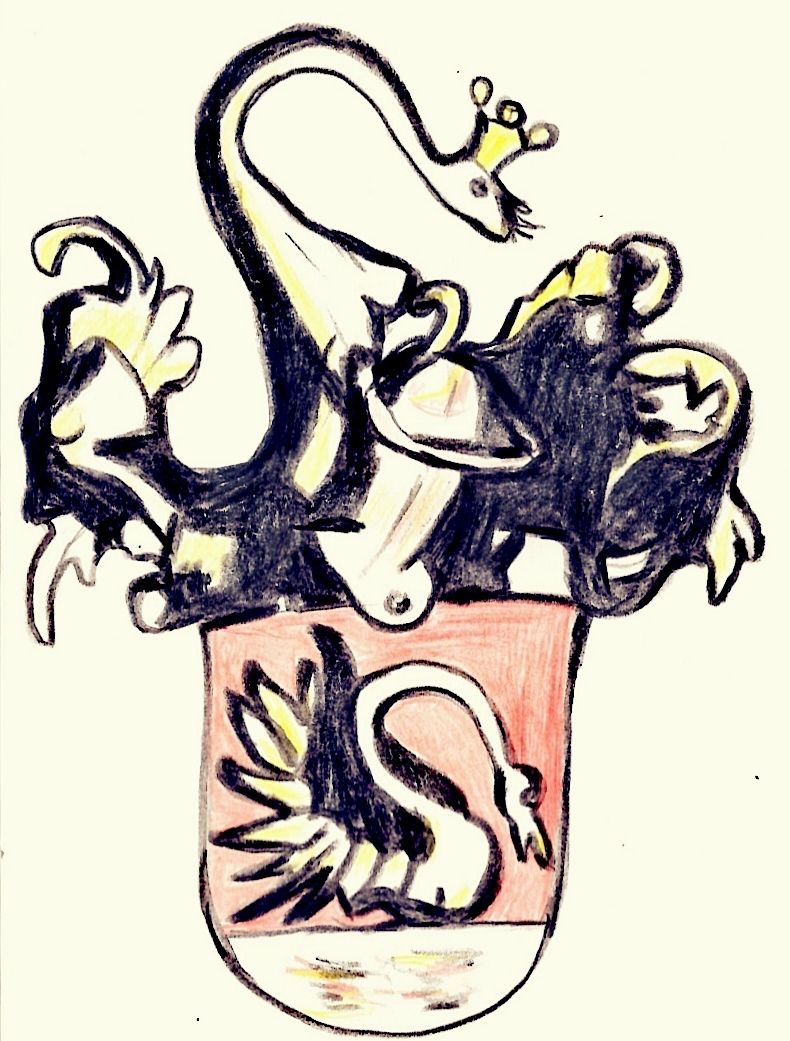
Possible, but bot proven coat of arms Op den Graeff as descendants of Herman op den Graeff (Heraldic representation by Matthias Laurenz Gräff based on the Krefeld Op den Graeff stained glass window from 1630)

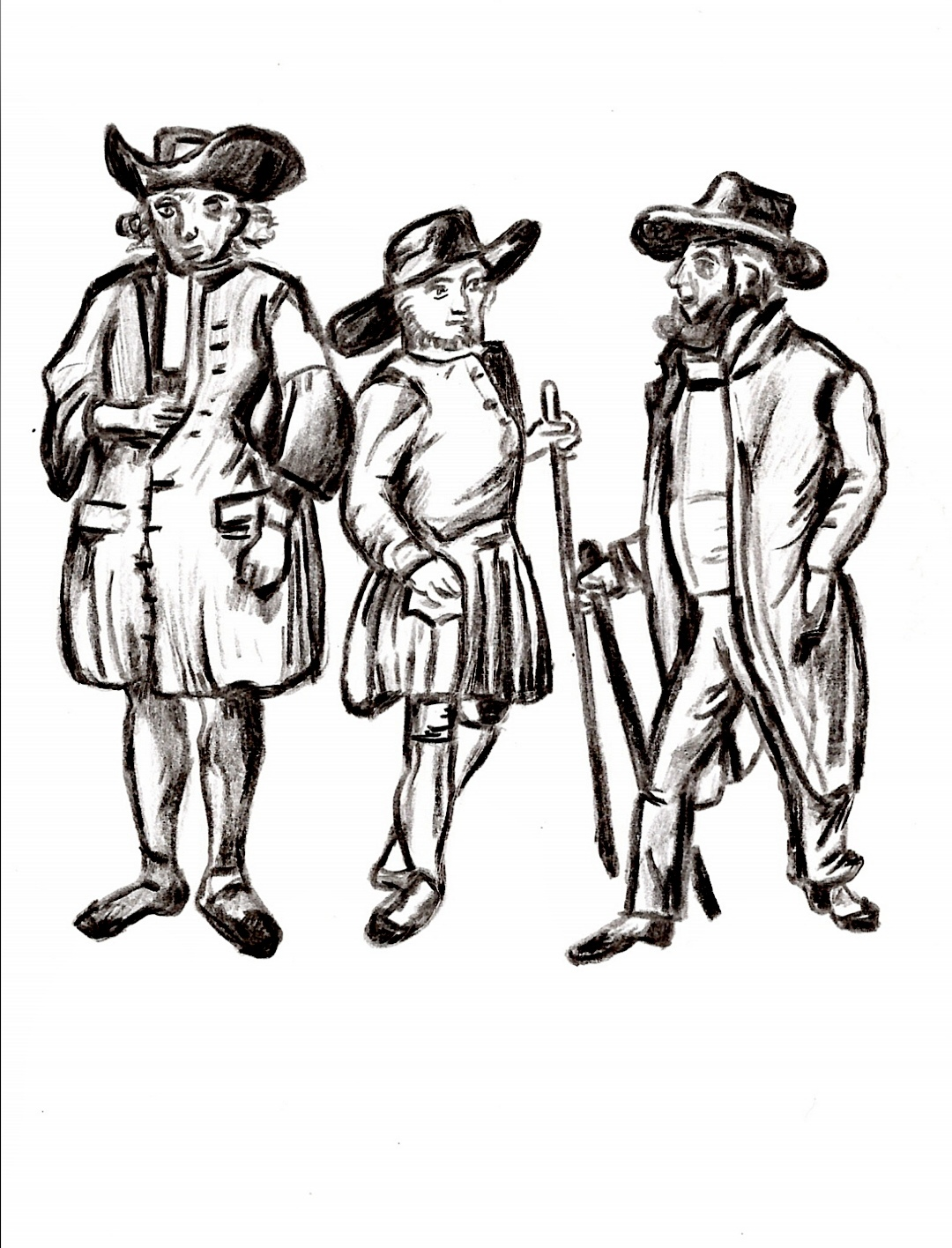
Three important members of the Op den Graeff family who were involved in the anti slavery movement and abolitionism. Left to right - Abraham op den Graeff (1649–1731), Derick op den Graeff (1646–1697) and David Benjamin Updegraff (1789–1864).

=== Early life ===
Thomas Updegraff attended the University of Notre Dame, then moved to Iowa. He was the clerk of the district court of Clayton County, Iowa, from 1856 to 1860. After studying law, he was admitted to the bar in 1860 and commenced practice in McGregor, Iowa.

=== Family ===
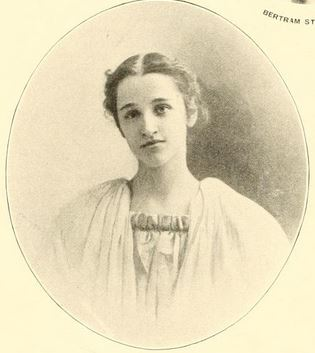
Miss Updegraff, daughter of Thomas Updegraff

In 1858, Updegraff married Laura A. Platt of Huron County, Ohio. She died in 1865, and he later married Florence Haight. They were the parents of two daughters, Elizabeth and Rachel.

=== Political career ===
In 1878 he began to serve as a member of the Iowa House of Representatives. In November of the same year, he was elected as a Republican to the United States House of Representatives from Iowa's 3rd congressional district, which was then made up of the seven counties in Iowa's northeastern corner. Two years later he was re-elected to a second term. The following year the Iowa General Assembly reapportioned the congressional districts to accommodate the addition of two additional seats, placing Updegraff's home county in a reconfigured 4th congressional district. He won the Republican Party's nomination in 1882. However, in the general election he was defeated by Luman Hamlin Weller of the United States Greenback Party. Updegraff had served Iowa's 3rd congressional district from March 4, 1879 to March 3, 1883.

Returning to Iowa, Updegraff was a member of the McGregor Board of Education, and the city solicitor. He was a delegate to the 1888 Republican National Convention.

In 1892, he again ran for Congress in Iowa's 4th district, winning not only the Republican nomination but also the general election (where he defeated incumbent Democrat Walter Halben Butler). He was re-elected to two more terms. However, in 1898, he was defeated in his bid for the Republican nomination by Gilbert N. Haugen, who would go on to serve seventeen consecutive terms. In all, Updegraff served the 4th congressional district from March 4, 1893 to March 3, 1899.

=== After Congress ===
Updegraff then returned to McGregor to resume the practice of law. He died in McGregor, and was interred there in Pleasant Grove Cemetery.

U.S. House of Representatives
Preceded by Theodore W. Burdick	Member of the U.S. House of Representatives from Iowa's 3rd congressional district 1879–1883	Succeeded by David B. Henderson
Preceded by Walter H. Butler	Member of the U.S. House of Representatives from Iowa's 4th congressional district 1893–1899	Succeeded by Gilbert N. Haugen
