= Michael P. Kelly =

American architect

- Born: January 31, 1954 (age 72); San Francisco, California
- Education: Princeton University
- Occupation: Architect
- Children: 3

Michael P. Kelly (born January 31, 1954) is an architect and urban planner who has led the public housing authorities of several large U.S. cities, and is a leading advocate for public policy that promotes affordable housing in the country.

== Early life and education ==
Kelly was born and raised in San Francisco, California. He received his Bachelor of Arts degree in Architecture and Urban Planning at Princeton University in 1977, and went on to receive a Masters of Architecture from the University of California, Berkeley, in 1983; and a Master of Arts in education from San Francisco State University that same year.

== Career ==
Kelly began his career in the public housing arena as an architect for the San Francisco Housing Authority in 1983. For nearly a decade, Kelly held a series of progressively responsible positions at the authority and was ultimately named its acting executive director—becoming the first registered architect to head a public housing authority in the U.S.

In 1994, Kelly left San Francisco to serve at the United States Department of Housing and Urban Development (HUD) as a Troubled Agency Recovery Specialist, providing technical assistance to the Transition Team at the Housing Authority of New Orleans. Then in 1995, he was named executive director of the New Orleans housing authority—a post he held until 2000.

In 2000, Kelly assumed leadership of the District of Columbia Housing Authority (DCHA), one of the nation's largest with a staff of 800 and operating and capital budgets of more than $300 million. DCHA administers 8,000 units of public housing and 12,000 units under the Housing Choice Voucher Program (HCVP), providing affordable housing for nearly 10 percent of the District's population.

At the end of September 2009, Kelly resigned from DCHA to become general manager of the New York City Housing Authority (NYCHA). Kelly served in this position until March 2011 when he was asked first to serve as the Administrative Receiver of the Philadelphia Housing Authority (PHA) by HUD Secretary Shaun Donovan and Philadelphia mayor Michael Nutter, and then by Mayor Michael Nutter to become permanent executive director at PHA. Kelly returned to Washington DC as Director of Department of Housing and Community Development in June 2012, after resigning his Philadelphia position for having had a consensual relationship that violated PHA's new ethics code prohibiting fraternization among senior staff and subordinates. On March 25, 2015, Kelly rejoined the NYCHA, again as General Manager. NYCHA administers more than 178,000 apartments with at least 400,000 residents.

In March 2018, Kelly joined the Brooklyn Navy Yard Development Corporation as executive Vice President and Chief Operating Officer in the midst of a major expansion of this mission-driven industrial park, after leaving NYCHA at the end of February 2018.

Kelly has held a number of academic appointments including Assistant Adjunct Professor in the School of Architecture and Engineering at Howard University in Washington, D.C. and Preceptor for the Project 55 Fellowship program at Princeton University, mentoring graduates with an interest in public service through a year-long fellowship. From 1997 to 2000, Kelly served as the Harvey-Wadsworth Professor of Urban Affairs at Tulane University, as well as a Visiting Lecturer at the University of California at Berkeley School of Architecture during the early 1980s. He received teaching credentials in New Jersey and California, and graduated from Princeton's program in Teaching Preparation.

In addition, Kelly has performed extensive professional service. He is the former President of the Council of Large Public Housing Authorities, a Washington, D.C.–based national non-profit organization whose members represent large metropolitan areas in the U.S. The council works to preserve and improve public and affordable housing through advocacy, research, policy analysis and public education. He also served as vice chairman of the National Organization of African Americans in Housing and sat on the boards of the National Center for Housing and Child Welfare, of the District of Columbia Interagency Commission on Homelessness, and of the Canal Park Development Association. In 2009, he became chairman of the Board of City Year, DC. Kelly is a member of the American Institute of Architects; the National Housing Conference; the National Association of Housing and Redevelopment Officials; the American Planning Association; the American Institute of Certified Planners; and is the US Green Building Council's Leed Green Associate.

Kelly is currently principal at Housing Industry Professionals (HIP) an urban planning consulting company committed to social justice through urban planning and design.
