= Perry Engle =

American physician and politician (1840–1935)

Member of the Iowa Senate from the 29th district
- In office January 11, 1892 – January 7, 1894

Personal details
- Born: July 16, 1840 Findlay, Ohio, U.S.
- Died: June 29, 1935 (aged 94)
- Spouse: Katie Madison (m. 1872)
- Education: Michigan State University
- Occupation: Politician, physician

Perry Engle (July 16, 1840 – June 29, 1935) was an American physician and politician.

== Education ==
Perry Engle was the eldest of eight sons born to Jacob Engle, a native of Somerset County, Pennsylvania, born in 1812, and his wife Louisa Engle. Perry Engle was born on July 16, 1840, in Findlay, Ohio. He planned to study law, but due to a speech disorder, pursued medicine instead. Engle earned a degree from Michigan State University and the Long Island Medical College. Engle then started his career in Brooklyn. In 1872, he married Ann Arbor, Michigan, native Katie Madison and moved with her to Newton, Iowa.

== Political career ==
Engle supported Abraham Lincoln in the 1860 presidential election. He joined the Greenback Party in 1876 and founded the Newton Herald, a newspaper aligned with the party, in the same year. From 1888, Engle transferred most of paper's management duties to William Burney. The publication changed its name later, to the Newton Daily News. Engle contested the 1889 Iowa Senate election as a candidate of the Union Labor Party, won the District 29 seat, and switched affiliations to the People's Party prior to the 1891 election. He remained a member of the Iowa Senate until the end of his four-year term in 1894. As a legislator, Engle advocated the passage of legislation that established the Educational Blind School for Adults in Knoxville. During his tenure as senator, he served as a tie-breaking vote for several measures. Engle mounted a bid for Congress in the 1882 United States House of Representatives elections. He was a candidate for the lieutenant governorship during the 1901 Iowa gubernatorial election. Both unsuccessful campaigns were supported by the People's Party.

Engle was a Freemason. He joined the society in 1861, while a resident of Findlay, Ohio. His membership was transferred to Newton, Iowa, in 1873. Engle died on June 29, 1935.
