= Thomas Rich (American politician) =

American politician (1830–1899)

Thomas Rich (3 March 1830 – 5 June 1899) was an English-born American politician.

Thomas Rich was born in Brighton, England on 3 March 1830 to parents Richard and Mary Rich. When Rich was three, his family immigrated to the United States. While they lived near Erie, Pennsylvania, Thomas pursued limited education. As the eldest son, he began working with his father in carpentry at a young age. When he turned twelve, his family moved again, to Whiteside County, Illinois. His work as a carpenter continued until the age of 28, when Rich moved to Carroll County, Iowa, where he became a farmer. He remained a farmer until 1885, when he moved into the town of Glidden to serve four years as postmaster. Subsequently, the Democratic Party nominated Rich as its candidate for the 1889 Iowa Senate election in District 48. Despite living in the heavily Republican Carroll County, Rich won the seat, defeating Z. A. Church, and served until 1894. In 1890, Rich moved to the town of Carroll. After stepping down from the Iowa Senate, Rich was elected to the Carroll County board of supervisors, serving three years from 1895, on which he had originally served from 1881 to 1884. Rich died on 5 June 1899.
