= Harrison Lyman Waterman =

American politician and businessman

Harrison Lyman Waterman (November 19, 1840 – May 21, 1918) was an American politician and businessman.

Born in Croydon, New Hampshire, Waterman moved to Iowa and was in the engineering business after graduating from Harvard University with a SB. He served in the Iowa State Senate from 1893 to 1897 as a Republican Party. He died in Ottumwa, Iowa.
