= Warren S. Dungan =

American politician (1822–1913)

16th Lieutenant Governor of Iowa
- In office 1894–1896
- Governor: Frank D. Jackson
- Preceded by: Samuel L. Bestow
- Succeeded by: Matt Parrott

Member of the Iowa House of Representatives
- In office January 12, 1880 – January 13, 1884
- Constituency: 10th District

Member of the Iowa Senate
- In office January 13, 1862 – January 10, 1864
- Constituency: 12th District
- In office January 9, 1888 – January 10, 1892
- Constituency: 4th District

Personal details
- Born: September 17, 1822 Frankfort Springs, Pennsylvania
- Died: May 9, 1913 (aged 90) Chariton, Iowa
- Party: Republican

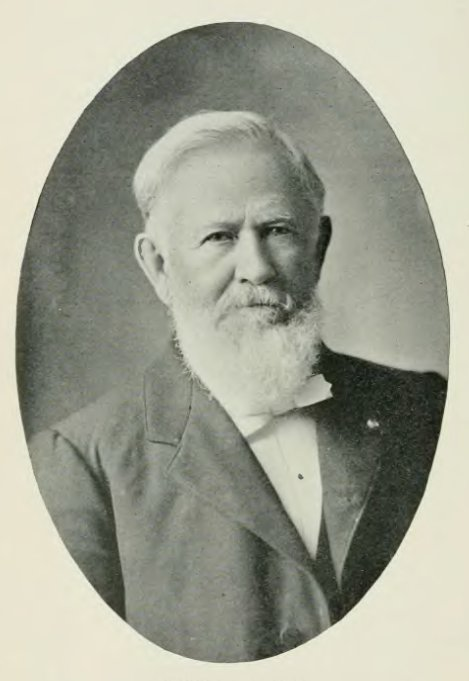
A photograph of Warren S. Dungan

Warren Scott Dungan (September 17, 1822 – May 9, 1913) was the Lieutenant Governor of Iowa from 1892 to 1894.

Born in Frankfort Springs, Pennsylvania, Dungan studied law and was admitted to the bar in Pennsylvania. He then moved to Chariton, Iowa, where he practiced law. Dungan served in the Union Army during the American Civil War. He also served in both houses of the Iowa General Assembly and as Lieutenant Governor of Iowa. Dungan died in Chariton, Iowa.

Political offices
| Preceded by Samuel L. Bestow | Lieutenant Governor of Iowa; 1894–1896 | Succeeded by Matt Parrott |
| Preceded by Lewis Miles | Iowa Senate, District 4; 1888-1891 | Succeeded by Lester W. Lewis |
