= Matt Parrott =

American politician and businessman

17th Lieutenant Governor of Iowa
- In office 1896–1898
- Governor: Francis M. Drake
- Preceded by: Warren S. Dungan
- Succeeded by: James C. Milliman

Member of the Iowa Senate
- In office January 11, 1886 – January 7, 1894
- Preceded by: Herman C. Hemenway
- Succeeded by: J. M. Rea
- Constituency: 38th District

Mayor of Waterloo
- In office 1877-1880
- Preceded by: Lewis Litchy
- Succeeded by: J. H. Kuhns

Personal details
- Born: Mathies Parrott; May 11, 1837 Schoharie County, New York, U.S.
- Died: April 21, 1900 (aged 62) Battle Creek, Michigan, U.S.
- Profession: Politician, businessman

Mathies "Matt" Parrott (May 11, 1837 – April 21, 1900) was the Lieutenant Governor of Iowa from 1896 to 1898.

Born in Schoharie County, New York, Parrott moved to Iowa and was in the newspaper and printing business. He served in the Iowa Senate from 1886 to 1894 and was Lieutenant Governor of Iowa from 1896 to 1898. He also served as Mayor of Waterloo from 1877 to 1880. He died in Battle Creek, Michigan in 1900.

== Notes ==
Political offices
| Preceded by Warren S. Dungan | Lieutenant Governor of Iowa; 1896–1898 | Succeeded by James C. Milliman |
