= Michael Kelly (physicist) =

New Zealand-British physicist

Professor Michael Kelly FRS FREng FIET

Prince Philip Professor of Technology, University of Cambridge
- In office 2002–2016

Personal details
- Born: Michael Joseph Kelly; 14 May 1949 (age 76) New Plymouth, New Zealand

Michael Joseph Kelly (born 14 May 1949) is a New Zealand-British physicist. He was Prince Philip Professor of Technology in the Department of Engineering of the University of Cambridge from 2002 to 2016.

== Education ==
Born in New Plymouth, New Zealand, Kelly went to Francis Douglas Memorial College in his High-school years, graduating he then went on to study at the Victoria University of Wellington for a BSc and MSc. He came to England in 1971 to study for a PhD at Cambridge under Volker Heine.

== Career ==
After finishing his PhD in 1974, he worked for seven years on the electronic structure of metals and semiconductors as a post-doc researcher. Kelly joined the GEC Hirst Research Centre in 1981, working on the development of microwave devices. From 1992 to 2002 he was Professor of Physics and Electronics at the University of Surrey. From 2003 to 2005 he was the Executive Director of the Cambridge–MIT Institute.

He was Prince Philip Professor of Technology working in the Solid State Electronics and Nanoscale Science group in the Electrical Engineering division of the Department of Engineering, University of Cambridge from 2002 to 2016. He is an Emeritus Fellow of Trinity Hall, Cambridge.

In 2018 Kelly became trustee of the Renewable Energy Foundation and in 2019 a trustee of the Global Warming Policy Foundation.

He was elected a Fellow of the Royal Society in 1993 and won its Hughes Medal in 2006. He was formerly the Chief Scientific Adviser to the Department for Communities and Local Government. He was elected in 1998 as a Fellow of the Royal Academy of Engineering.

== Climatic Research Unit investigation ==
In 2010, Kelly was named by the Royal Society and the University of East Anglia to an independent scientific assessment panel to investigate the Climatic Research Unit email controversy. The panel concluded that there was "no evidence of any deliberate scientific malpractice in any of the work of the Climatic Research Unit."

== Bibliography ==
- Low-Dimensional Semiconductors: Materials, Physics, Technology, Devices, Oxford University Press 2002, ISBN 0-19-851780-7
