= Lewis Hanchett =

American politician (1843–1892)

Lewis S. Hanchett (14 July 1843 – 12 May 1892) was an American politician.

Lewis Hanchett was a native of Chautauqua County, New York, born 14 July 1843 on to parents Joseph C. Hanchett and Sabrina Howard. Hanchett served in the American Civil War with the 49th New York Infantry Regiment from 1861 to the end of the conflict. He was captured as a prisoner of war during the Battle of Spotsylvania Court House, and sent to Andersonville Prison for six months, after which he was released as part of a prisoner exchange. In January 1865, Hanchett settled in Bremer County, Iowa, where he became a merchant. He was elected to three terms as county sheriff, starting in 1875. Between 1882 and 1884, Hanchett was a Republican member of the Iowa House of Representatives for District 61. He returned to the state legislature after winning the 1887 Iowa Senate election as an independent candidate from District 39. Before the 1889 election, he had rejoined the Republican Party. Hanchett completed his Iowa Senate term in January 1892 and died on 12 May 1892.
