= John Kelly Johnson =

American politician and judge (1841–1894)

John Kelly Johnson (22 August 1841 – 12 November 1894) was an American politician.

John Kelly Johnson was born on 22 August 1841 to Abijah Johnson and Elizabeth Bailey. When Johnson was thirteen, he and his family moved from Greene County, Ohio, to Indiana, where he attended Wabash College and Battle Ground Institute. Johnson subsequently pursued legal studies at the University of Michigan. Upon moving to Oskaloosa, Iowa, in 1865, he read law with J. R. Barcroft and later attended law school in Des Moines. After passing the bar in 1867, Johnson moved to Eddyville and began practicing law alongside Henry N. Clements, a classmate of his at Michigan. While living in Eddyville, Johnson served as city attorney as well. In 1868, he returned to Oskaloosa, where he established a firm with George W. Lafferty and also served as city attorney from 1869 to 1870.

Johnson was a Republican member of the Iowa Senate for District 15 from 1880 to 1884. Upon his election to a judgeship in 1883, Johnson stepped away from his partnership with Lafferty. He retained his position for the sixth judicial district in the 1886 and 1890 elections. He died on 12 November 1894.
