= Joseph M. Casey =

American lawyer, judge, and politician (1827–1895)

Joseph M. Casey (25 March 1827 – 9 February 1895) was an American lawyer, judge, and politician.

Joseph M. Casey was born on 25 March 1827, to parents Green Casey and Jane Patterson, who were living in Adair County, Kentucky, at the time. Casey's father was the first male child to be born in Adair County, and his mother was a native of Rockbridge County, Virginia. The Casey family and their six children later moved to Keokuk County, Iowa. When Joseph was eleven, his father died.

Joseph Casey pursued the study of law under John F. Kinney of Lee County, and passed the Iowa bar in 1847. Casey began practicing law in Keokuk County, serving as the county's prosecuting attorney for five years. From October 1859, Casey was Keokuk County judge. His county judgeship ended in April 1861, when he moved to Fort Madison. While a resident of Fort Madison, Casey was appointed to a judgeship in the first judicial district. Politically, Casey supported Lewis Cass during the 1844 Democratic National Convention. Casey served twice as mayor of Fort Madison. He also served in both houses of the Iowa General Assembly as a Democrat. Between 1880 and 1882, he was a member of the Iowa House of Representatives for District 1. From 1886 to 1888, Casey occupied the District 1 seat in the Iowa Senate.

In 1854, Casey married Ohio native Sarah J. Ward. The couple raised five children, four of whom survived to adulthood. Casey died at home in Fort Madison on 9 February 1895.
