= John Ryder (state senator) =

American politician (1831–1911)

John Ryder (14 August 1831 – 13 August 1911) was an American politician who served in the state legislatures of Ohio and Iowa.

Ryder was born near Tiffin, Ohio, on 14 August 1831. He was educated within rural county schools, and became a merchant, specializing in wool and grain. Ryder was a member of the Whig Party. Sometime after the dissolution of the Whig Party, he joined the Republican Party and served one term on the Ohio House of Representatives starting in 1862. In 1870, Ryder relocated to Benton County, Iowa and began selling foodstuffs, specifically eggs and butter. Ryder backed Horace Greeley's 1872 presidential campaign, during which Greeley was backed by the Liberal Republican and Democratic political parties. Ryder himself was elected to the Iowa House of Representatives in 1881, as a politically independent candidate from District 46. In 1883, Ryder was elected to a four-year term on the Iowa Senate, representing District 27 as a Democrat.

Ryder married Mary J. Tyler, a native of Fremont, Ohio, in November 1854. He died on 13 August 1911, in Vinton, Iowa.
