= William Groneweg =

German-American politician (1838–1928)

William Groneweg (24 July 1838 – 4 August 1928) was a German-born American politician.

He was born in Lemförde to parents William H. Groneweg and Caroline Behning on 24 July 1838. Upon completing his education, Groneweg was apprenticed to a storekeeper for five years. He arrived in the United States in 1859, and lived with a brother in Cincinnati, and another brother in St. Joseph, Missouri. Groneweg moved from Missouri to Council Bluffs, Iowa in 1861. In Council Bluffs, Groneweg established a retail grocery store. He divested from retail in 1878 to form a partnership with John Schoetgen as a wholesale grocer.

Politically, Groneweg was affiliated with the Democratic Party. He served on the Council Bluffs school board, was a Pottawattamie County supervisor from 1868 to 1871, and served as treasurer of Council Bluffs from 1872 to 1876, when he lost an election for Iowa State Auditor to Buren R. Sherman. Groneweg was elected mayor of Council Bluffs in 1886, serving two years in the office. In 1887, Groneweg was elected to his first term on the Iowa Senate for District 19. He won reelection in 1891, and stepped down upon the conclusion of his second term in 1896. Groneweg died in Council Bluffs on 4 August 1928.

== See also ==
- List of mayors of Council Bluffs, Iowa
