= Joseph Henry Sweney =

American politician

Joseph Sweney
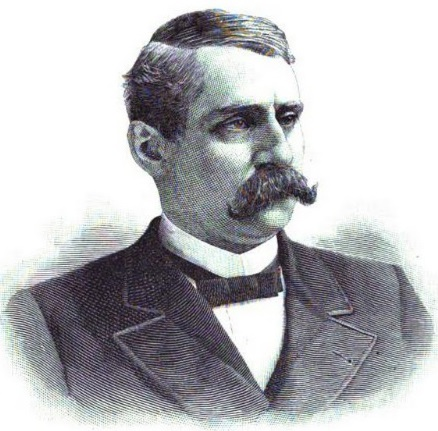

Member of the U.S. House of Representatives from Iowa's 4th district
- In office March 4, 1885 – March 3, 1889
- Preceded by: William E. Fuller
- Succeeded by: Walter H. Butler

Personal details
- Born: October 2, 1845 Warren County, Pennsylvania, U.S.
- Died: November 11, 1918 (aged 73) Norfolk, Virginia, U.S
- Party: Republican
- Education: University of Iowa

Military service
- Branch/service: Union Army
- Rank: Sergeant
- Unit: Company K, 27th Iowa Infantry Regiment
- Battles/wars: Civil War

Joseph Henry Sweney (October 2, 1845 – November 11, 1918) was a one-term Republican U.S. Representative from Iowa's 4th congressional district in northeastern Iowa.

Born in Warren County, Pennsylvania, Sweney attended the public schools of Pennsylvania and Iowa. During the Civil War enlisted in the Union Army and served as a sergeant in Company K, 27th Iowa Volunteer Infantry Regiment. After the war, he served as colonel of the Sixth Regiment of the Iowa National Guard for four years and brigadier and inspector general of the State.

He was graduated from the University of Iowa College of Law in 1881. He was admitted to the bar the same year and commenced practice in Osage, Iowa. He also engaged in banking and agricultural pursuits.

He was twice elected to the Iowa Senate, serving as president pro tempore in 1886. He was elected to two four-year terms (beginning in 1883 and 1887), but left the Senate in 1889 following his election to Congress.

In 1888, Sweney was elected as a Republican to the Fifty-first Congress, following the decision of incumbent Republican William E. Fuller not to seek a third term. However, his re-election bid was thwarted when he was upset by Democrat Walter Halben Butler as part of a Democratic landslide in 1890. He served in Congress from March 4, 1889 to March 3, 1891.

After leaving Congress, he resumed the practice of law in Osage. He died while on a visit in Norfolk, Virginia, on November 11, 1918. He was interred in Osage Cemetery.

U.S. House of Representatives
Preceded by William E. Fuller	U.S. House of Representatives, 4th Iowa District; 1889–1891	Succeeded by Walter H. Butler
