= Edward R. Cassatt =

American politician

Member of the Iowa Senate from the 15th district
- In office January 14, 1884 – January 10, 1892
- Preceded by: John Kelly Johnson
- Succeeded by: Theodore Perry

Personal details
- Born: Edward Roberts Cassatt; April 14, 1839 Wabash County, Indiana, United States
- Died: June 26, 1907 (aged 68) Albert Lea, Minnesota, United States
- Party: Democrat

Edward Roberts Cassatt (April 14, 1839 – June 26, 1907) was an American politician.

Cassatt was born on April 14, 1839, in Wabash County, Indiana. He attended Indiana common schools and first moved to Iowa in 1857, where he enrolled at Central University in Pella. He returned to Indiana to read law with judge John W. Petit, then was admitted to the bar in Knoxville, Iowa, in 1868. Cassatt worked alongside Jairus Edward Neal, whose daughter Emily he married in 1860. Due to health concerns, Cassatt abandoned the practice of law and became a miller. Subsequently, Cassatt helped establish the First National Bank of Pella and the Marion County National Bank in Knoxville. From 1884 to 1892, Casatt served in the Iowa Senate from District 15 as a Democrat.

Following his two terms as state senator, Cassatt became dependent on alcohol and morphine, and lost nearly $250,000 investing in wheat on the Chicago Board of Trade. Smaller transactions were processed in Des Moines. The First National Bank of Pella also lost money. Arraigned on charges of embezzlement, Cassatt attempted suicide on June 3, 1895, by cutting his throat and pouring poison into the resulting wounds. He was found guilty of violating banking laws. On July 15, 1895, Cassatt was sentenced to nine years imprisonment by John Simson Woolson, of which he served a portion in Anamosa, Iowa, before he was pardoned by President William McKinley in 1900. In later life, Cassatt moved to Albert Lea, Minnesota, where he died on June 26, 1907, from a stomach issue. He was buried in Pella's Oak Wood (or Oakland) Cemetery.
