= Michael Joseph Kelly (American politician) =

American politician (1850–1911)

Michael Joseph Kelly (22 March 1850 – 11 January 1911) was an Irish-born American politician.

Kelly was born in County Tipperary on 22 March 1850. When he was two years old, he and his parents emigrated the United States. For six years, Kelly lived in Port Byron, New York, until the family moved again, to Muscatine, Iowa. He was educated in Muscatine and trained as a tinsmith. Aged 18, Kelly relocated to Lytle City, in Iowa County. After one year, he relocated to Des Moines. Kelly married Margery Lytle, the daughter of Lytle City founder B. F. Lytle, in 1870. The couple raised eight children. From 1874 to 1883, Kelly again resided in Lytle City. Kelly subsequently moved to Williamsburg. While residing in Williamsburg, he chose to pursue education at the University of Iowa College of Law. He soon founded the general store Kelly & Lytle. Kelly's other business interests as a resident of Williamsburg included banking. He was the president of Williamsburg Savings Bank and a director at Parnell Saving Bank. Politically, Kelly was affiliated with the Democratic Party, had held the chairmanship of the Iowa County board of supervisors, and also served as justice of the peace. He was elected to the Iowa Senate for the first time in 1887, and held the District 25 seat until 1896. After concluding his second full term as state senator, Kelly returned to his store in Williamsburg, which closed when he moved to Colorado in 1906. Kelly died in Denver on 10 January 1911, and was buried in Williamsburg, Iowa, six days later.
