= Isaac T. Tichenor =

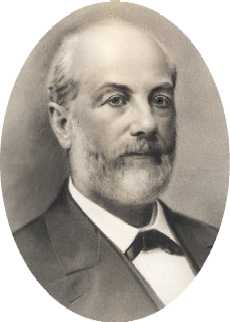

President of the Auburn University
- In office 1872–1881
- Preceded by: James Ferguson Dowdell
- Succeeded by: William Leroy Broun

Personal details
- Born: November 11, 1825 Spencer County, Kentucky
- Died: December 2, 1902 (aged 77) Atlanta, Georgia

Isaac Taylor Tichenor (November 11, 1825 – December 2, 1902), a pastor and a planter, was President of the Agricultural and Mechanical College of Alabama, now known as Auburn University, from 1872 to 1881.

== Early life ==
Isaac Taylor Tichenor was born on November 11, 1825, in Spencer County, Kentucky, to James and Margaret (Bennett) Tichenor.

== Career ==
Tichenor served as pastor in Columbus, Mississippi, in 1849 and in Henderson, Kentucky, in 1851. From 1852 to 1867, he was pastor at the First Baptist Church in Montgomery, Alabama.

During the American Civil War, he was a chaplain in the Confederate States Army. In 1863, he still defended slavery in his sermons. After the war, he spent three years on his plantation in Shelby County, Alabama.

In 1871, he became pastor at the First Baptist Church in Memphis, Tennessee, but resigned shortly after. He also was a pastor in Kentucky and Mississippi.

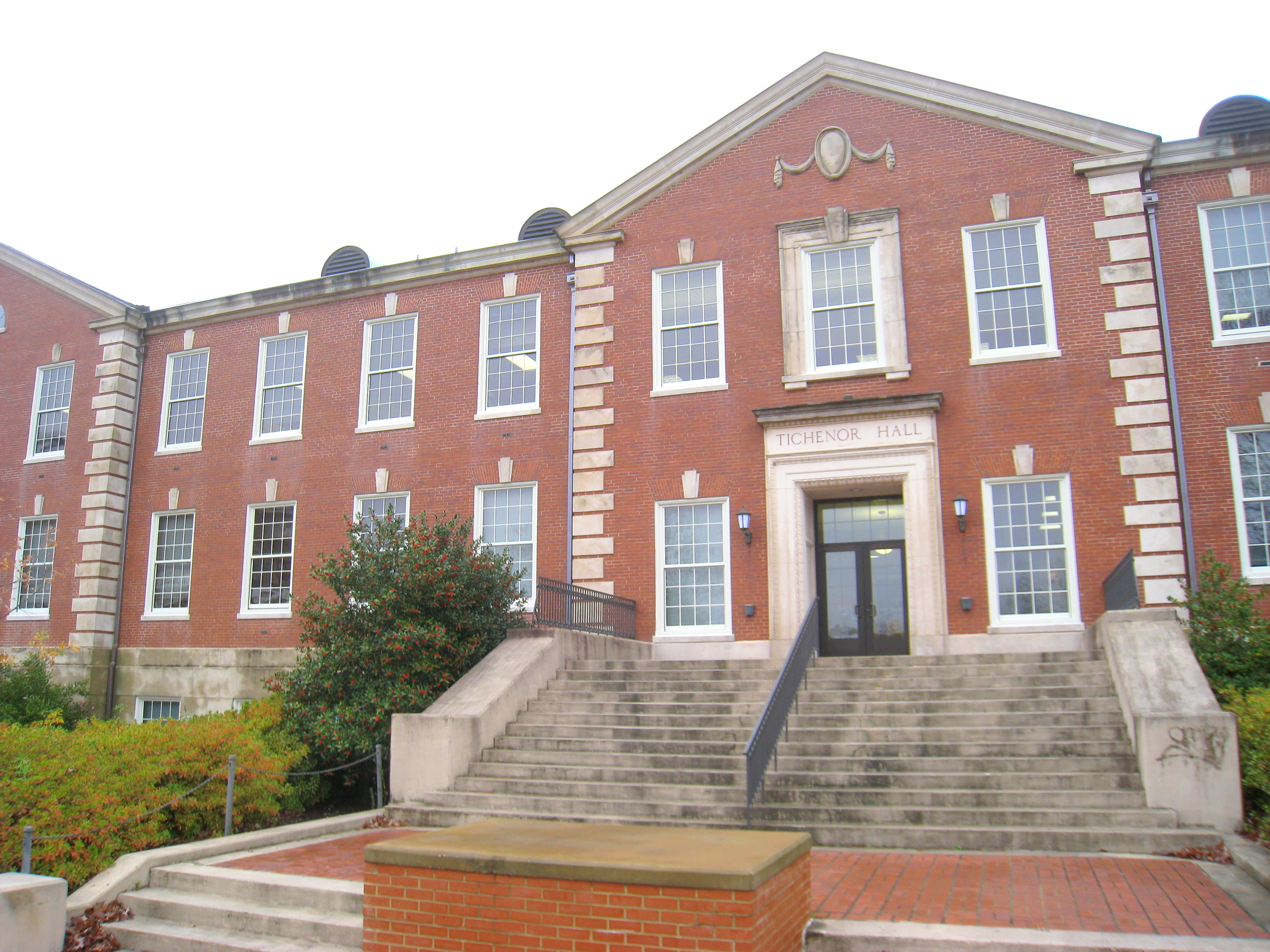
Tichenor Hall

From 1872 to 1881, he served as President of the Agricultural and Mechanical College of Alabama, now known as Auburn University. In 1882, he became President of the Southern Baptist Home Missionary Board in Atlanta, Georgia.

== Death ==
He died on December 2, 1902, in Atlanta, Georgia. He is buried in Westview Cemetery.

Academic offices
Preceded by James Ferguson Dowdell	President of Auburn University; 1872–1881	Succeeded by William Leroy Broun
