= William Leroy Broun =

American academic (1827–1902)

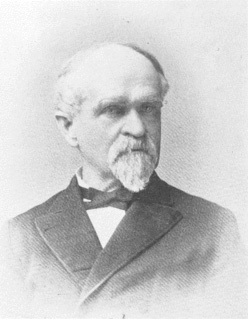
- Broun pictured in The Glomerata 1897, Auburn yearbook

President of the Auburn University
- In office 1882–1883

President of the Auburn University
- In office 1883–1902

Personal details
- Born: October 1, 1827 Middleburg, Virginia
- Died: January 24, 1902 (aged 74) Auburn, Alabama

William Leroy Broun (October 1, 1827 – January 24, 1902) was the president of the Agricultural and Mechanical College of Alabama, then known as the Alabama Polytechnic Institute, now known as Auburn University, from 1882 to 1902, with a one-year hiatus in 1883.

== Biography ==
William Leroy Broun was born in Middleburg, Virginia on October 1, 1827. He graduated from the University of Virginia in 1850. During the American Civil War, he headed the Confederate Arsenal at Richmond, Virginia.

He taught at the College of Mississippi in 1852, the University of Georgia in 1854 and again in 1866. He was a school principal of Bloomfield academy, Virginia, in 1856. From 1872 to 1875, he taught at UGA again, and became president of the Georgia Agricultural and Mechanical College, a branch of the university. From 1875 to 1882, he was a professor of mathematics at Vanderbilt University in Nashville, Tennessee. He also taught mathematics at the University of Texas in 1884.

From 1882 to 1902, he served as the president of the Agricultural and Mechanical College of Alabama, then known as the Alabama Polytechnic Institute, now known as Auburn University, with a one-year hiatus in 1883.

== Bibliography ==
- Notes On Artillery: From Robins, Hutton, Chesney, Mordecai, Dahlgreen, Jacob, Greener, Gibbon, And Benton (1862)

Academic offices
Preceded by Isaac T. Tichenor	President of Auburn University; 1882–1883	Succeeded by David French Boyd
Preceded by David French Boyd	President of Auburn University; 1883–1902	Succeeded by Charles Coleman Thach
