= David French Boyd =

American teacher and educational administrator

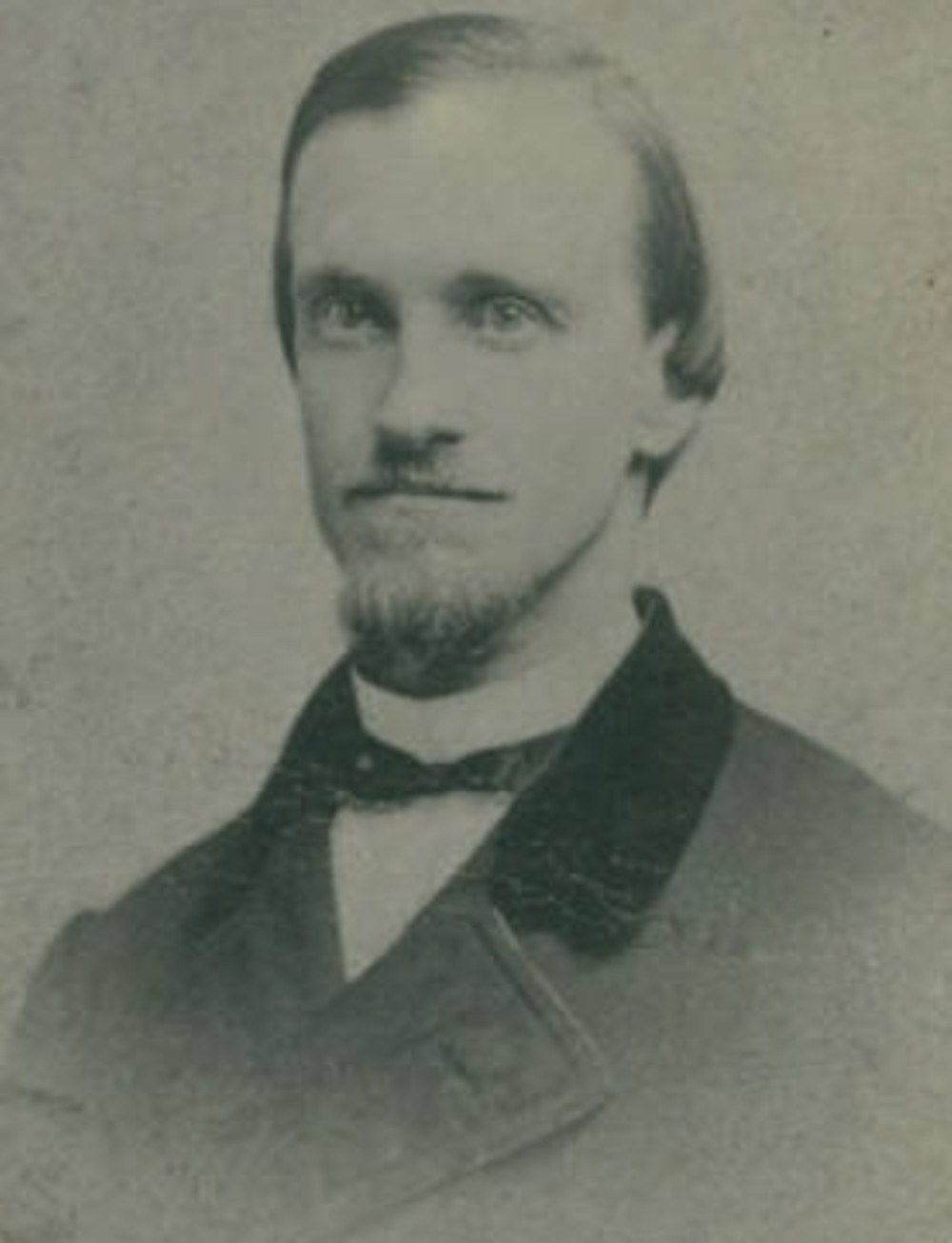

President of the Louisiana State University
- In office 1877–1880
- Preceded by: First LSU president
- In office 1884–1886
- Succeeded by: Thomas Duckett Boyd (interim)

President of Auburn University
- In office 1883–1884
- Preceded by: William Leroy Broun
- Succeeded by: William Leroy Broun

Personal details
- Born: October 5, 1834 Wytheville, Virginia, U.S.
- Died: May 27, 1899 (aged 64) Baton Rouge, Louisiana, U.S.
- Resting place: Magnolia Cemetery in Baton Rouge
- Relations: Thomas Duckett Boyd (brother)
- Parent(s): Thomas J. and Minerva A. French Boyd

Military service
- Allegiance: Confederate States of America
- Branch/service: Confederate States Army
- Rank: Major
- Unit: 9th Louisiana Infantry
- Battles/wars: American Civil War: Western Theater

David French Boyd (October 5, 1834 – May 27, 1899) was an American teacher and educational administrator. He served as the first head of Louisiana State University (LSU), where he was a professor of mathematics and moral philosophy. He was also briefly the president of the Agricultural and Mechanical College of Alabama (now Auburn University).

== Biography ==
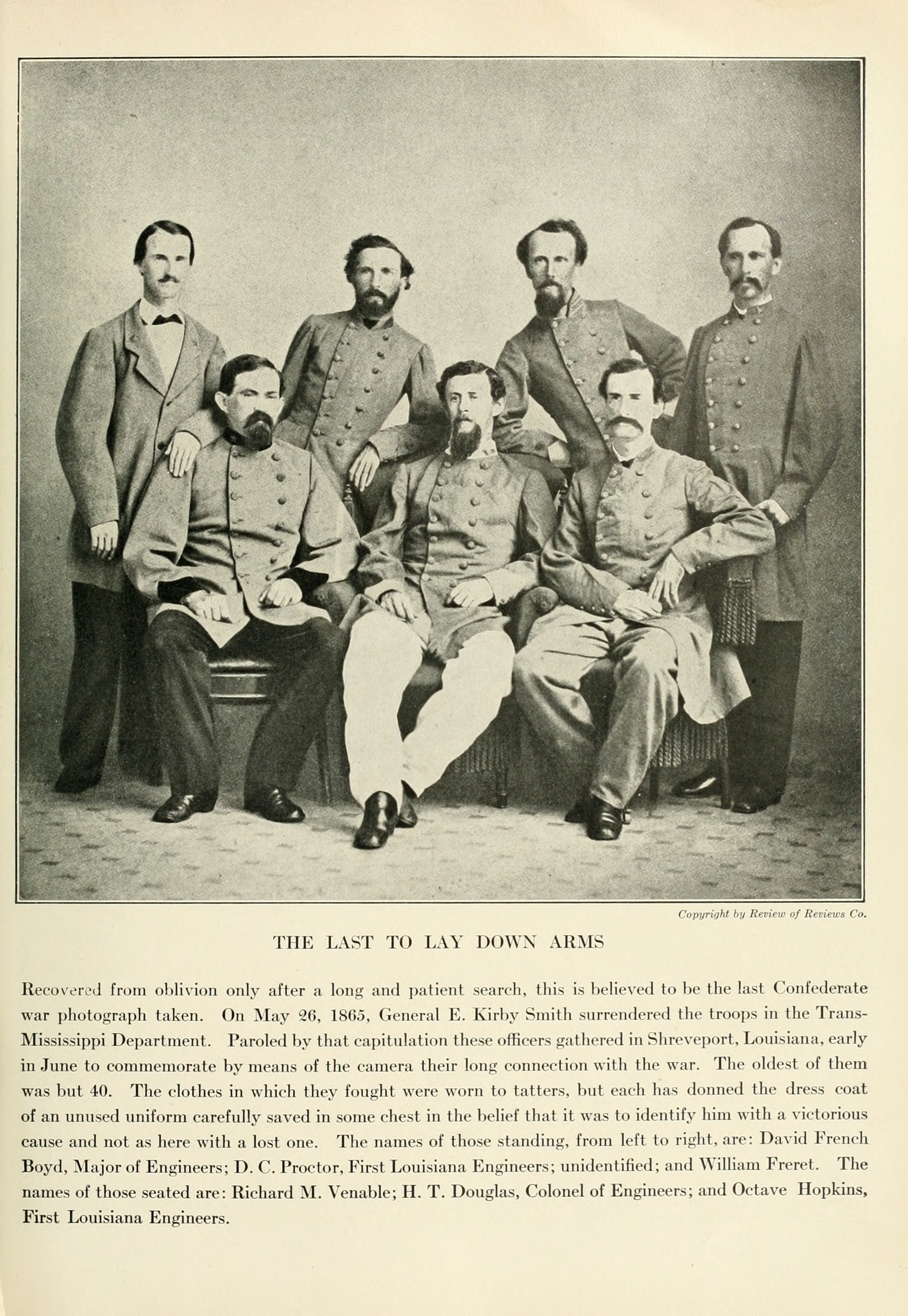
June 1865 Major Boyd is at far left top row

Boyd, the eldest son of Thomas J. Boyd, a wealthy lawyer and railroad promoter, was born in Wytheville, Virginia. He studied at the University of Virginia but failed to graduate. Because of personal difficulties in his native state, he migrated to Louisiana and, in 1860, joined the faculty of the newly created Louisiana State Seminary of Learning in Pineville in Central Louisiana. There, he became a close friend of the institution's superintendent, William Tecumseh Sherman, who on the eve of the American Civil War famously warned Boyd, an enthusiastic secessionist, of the South's folly in pursuing a war with the North which it could not possibly win.

During the war, Boyd fought in the Confederate army. He initially served in the 9th Louisiana Infantry, a regiment that was part of the famed Louisiana Tigers of the Army of Northern Virginia. He later transferred to the Western Theater, where he was a major of engineering. He was captured by Jayhawker militia and sold to the Union Army before being exchanged and returned to the South following Sherman's intervention.

After the end of the war in 1865, Boyd returned to the Seminary as superintendent and later wrote the charter that transformed the institution into Louisiana State University, based in Baton Rouge, under the terms of the Morrill Land-Grant Colleges Act. He was dismissed in 1880 over conflicts with the faculty, but was restored as president of LSU in 1884. During his hiatus, he served a year as the president of Auburn University in Auburn, Alabama.

He died in 1899, and is buried in Magnolia Cemetery in Baton Rouge.

Academic offices
Preceded by William Leroy Broun	President of Auburn University; 1883–1884	Succeeded by William Leroy Broun
