= List of United States representatives in the 46th Congress =

This is a complete list of United States representatives during the 46th United States Congress listed by seniority.

As an historical article, the districts and party affiliations listed reflect those during the 46th Congress (March 4, 1879 – March 3, 1881). Seats and party affiliations on similar lists for other congresses will be different for certain members.

Seniority depends on the date on which members were sworn into office. Since many members are sworn in on the same day, subsequent ranking is based on previous congressional service of the individual and then by alphabetical order by the last name of the representative.

Committee chairmanship in the House is often associated with seniority. However, party leadership is typically not associated with seniority.

Note: The "*" indicates that the representative/delegate may have served one or more non-consecutive terms while in the House of Representatives of the United States Congress.

== U.S. House seniority list ==
U.S. House seniority
Rank	Representative	Party	District	Seniority date (Previous service, if any)	No.# of term(s)	Notes
1	William D. Kelley	R	PA-04	March 4, 1861	10th term	Dean of the House
2	James A. Garfield	R	OH-19	March 4, 1863	9th term	Resigned on November 8, 1880.
3	Samuel J. Randall	D	PA-03	March 4, 1863	9th term	Speaker of the House
4	Fernando Wood	D	NY-09	March 4, 1867; Previous service, 1841–1843 and 1863–1865.	9th term**	Died on February 13, 1881.
5	Omar D. Conger	R	MI-07	March 4, 1869	6th term	Resigned on March 3, 1881.
6	John Morgan Bright	D	TN-05	March 4, 1871	5th term	Left the House in 1881.
7	Mark H. Dunnell	R	MN-01	March 4, 1871	5th term	
8	William P. Frye	R	ME-02	March 4, 1871	5th term	
9	John T. Harris	D	VA-07	March 4, 1871; Previous service, 1859–1861.	6th term*	Left the House in 1881.
10	James Monroe	R	OH-17	March 4, 1871	5th term	Left the House in 1881.
11	Washington C. Whitthorne	D	TN-07	March 4, 1871	5th term	
12	John DeWitt Clinton Atkins	D	TN-08	March 4, 1873; Previous service, 1857–1859.	5th term*	
13	Richard P. Bland	D	MO-05	March 4, 1873	4th term	
14	James Henderson Blount	D	GA-06	March 4, 1873	4th term	
15	Aylett Hawes Buckner	D	MO-13	March 4, 1873	4th term	
16	Joseph Gurney Cannon	R	IL-14	March 4, 1873	4th term	
17	John Bullock Clark, Jr.	D	MO-11	March 4, 1873	4th term	
18	Hiester Clymer	D	PA-08	March 4, 1873	4th term	Left the House in 1881.
19	Philip Cook	D	GA-03	March 4, 1873	4th term	
20	Greenbury L. Fort	R	IL-08	March 4, 1873	4th term	Left the House in 1881.
21	Benjamin W. Harris	R	MA-02	March 4, 1873	4th term	
22	Jay Abel Hubbell	R	MI-09	March 4, 1873	4th term	
23	Eppa Hunton	D	VA-08	March 4, 1873	4th term	Left the House in 1881.
24	Roger Q. Mills	D	TX-04	March 4, 1873	4th term	
25	William Ralls Morrison	D	IL-17	March 4, 1873; Previous service, 1863–1865.	5th term*	
26	Charles O'Neill	R	PA-02	March 4, 1873; Previous service, 1863–1871.	8th term*	
27	Horace F. Page	R	CA-02	March 4, 1873	4th term	
28	Abraham Herr Smith	R	PA-09	March 4, 1873	4th term	
29	Robert B. Vance	D	NC-08	March 4, 1873	4th term	
30	Charles G. Williams	R	WI-01	March 4, 1873	4th term	
31	Samuel S. Cox	D	NY-06	November 4, 1873; Previous service, 1857–1865 and 1869–1873.	10th term**	
32	Alexander H. Stephens	D	GA-08	December 1, 1873; Previous service, 1843–1859.	12th term*	
33	Thomas M. Gunter	D	AR-04	June 16, 1874	4th term	
34	Simeon B. Chittenden	R	NY-03	November 3, 1874	4th term	Left the House in 1881.
35	John Baker	R	IN-13	March 4, 1875	3rd term	Left the House in 1881.
36	Latimer Whipple Ballou	R	RI-02	March 4, 1875	3rd term	Left the House in 1881.
37	Joseph Clay Stiles Blackburn	D	KY-07	March 4, 1875	3rd term	
38	Archibald M. Bliss	D	NY-04	March 4, 1875	3rd term	
39	George Cabell	D	VA-05	March 4, 1875	3rd term	
40	Lucien B. Caswell	R	WI-02	March 4, 1875	3rd term	
41	David B. Culberson	D	TX-02	March 4, 1875	3rd term	
42	Joseph J. Davis	D	NC-04	March 4, 1875	3rd term	Left the House in 1881.
43	George Gibbs Dibrell	D	TN-03	March 4, 1875	3rd term	
44	E. John Ellis	D	LA-02	March 4, 1875	3rd term	
45	William Harrell Felton	D	GA-07	March 4, 1875	3rd term	Left the House in 1881.
46	William H. Forney	D	AL-07	March 4, 1875	3rd term	
47	Randall L. Gibson	D	LA-01	March 4, 1875	3rd term	
48	John Goode	D	VA-02	March 4, 1875	3rd term	Left the House in 1881.
49	Thomas J. Henderson	R	IL-06	March 4, 1875	3rd term	
50	Eli Jones Henkle	D	MD-05	March 4, 1875	3rd term	Left the House in 1881.
51	Charles E. Hooker	D	MS-05	March 4, 1875	3rd term	
52	John Ford House	D	TN-06	March 4, 1875	3rd term	
53	Charles Herbert Joyce	R	VT-01	March 4, 1875	3rd term	
54	J. Proctor Knott	D	KY-04	March 4, 1875; Previous service, 1867–1871.	5th term*	
55	Elbridge G. Lapham	R	NY-27	March 4, 1875	3rd term	
56	John A. McMahon	D	OH-03	March 4, 1875	3rd term	Left the House in 1881.
57	Hernando Money	D	MS-03	March 4, 1875	3rd term	
58	James Phelps	D	CT-02	March 4, 1875	3rd term	
59	John Henninger Reagan	D	TX-01	March 4, 1875; Previous service, 1857–1861.	5th term*	
60	Miles Ross	D	NJ-03	March 4, 1875	3rd term	
61	Alfred Moore Scales	D	NC-05	March 4, 1875; Previous service, 1857–1859.	4th term*	
62	Otho R. Singleton	D	MS-04	March 4, 1875; Previous service, 1853–1855 and 1857–1861.	6th term**	
63	William F. Slemons	D	AR-02	March 4, 1875	3rd term	Left the House in 1881.
64	William Ephraim Smith	D	GA-02	March 4, 1875	3rd term	Left the House in 1881.
65	William A.J. Sparks	D	IL-16	March 4, 1875	3rd term	
66	William McKendree Springer	D	IL-12	March 4, 1875	3rd term	
67	John R. Tucker	D	VA-06	March 4, 1875	3rd term	
68	Benjamin Wilson	D	WV-01	March 4, 1875	3rd term	
69	H. Casey Young	D	TN-10	March 4, 1875	3rd term	Left the House in 1881.
70	William W. Crapo	R	MA-01	November 2, 1875	3rd term	
71	John T. Wait	R	CT-03	April 12, 1876	3rd term	
72	D. Wyatt Aiken	D	SC-03	March 4, 1877	2nd term	
73	William Aldrich	R	IL-01	March 4, 1877	2nd term	
74	Thomas McKee Bayne	R	PA-23	March 4, 1877	2nd term	
75	George A. Bicknell	D	IN-03	March 4, 1877	2nd term	Left the House in 1881.
76	Thomas A. Boyd	R	IL-09	March 4, 1877	2nd term	Left the House in 1881.
77	Edward S. Bragg	D	WI-05	March 4, 1877	2nd term	
78	Mark S. Brewer	R	MI-06	March 4, 1877	2nd term	Left the House in 1881.
79	James Frankland Briggs	R	NH-02	March 4, 1877	2nd term	
80	Thomas M. Browne	R	IN-05	March 4, 1877	2nd term	
81	Gabriel Bouck	D	WI-06	March 4, 1877	2nd term	Left the House in 1881.
82	John W. Caldwell	D	KY-03	March 4, 1877	2nd term	
83	William H. Calkins	R	IN-10	March 4, 1877	2nd term	
84	John H. Camp	R	NY-26	March 4, 1877	2nd term	
85	John G. Carlisle	D	KY-06	March 4, 1877	2nd term	
86	James Ronald Chalmers	D	MS-06	March 4, 1877	2nd term	
87	William Claflin	R	MA-08	March 4, 1877	2nd term	Left the House in 1881.
88	Alvah A. Clark	D	NJ-04	March 4, 1877	2nd term	Left the House in 1881.
89	Rush Clark	R	IA-05	March 4, 1877	2nd term	Died on April 29, 1879.
90	Thomas R. Cobb	D	IN-02	March 4, 1877	2nd term	
91	James W. Covert	D	NY-01	March 4, 1877	2nd term	Left the House in 1881.
92	Jordan E. Cravens	D	AR-03	March 4, 1877	2nd term	
93	Nathaniel Cobb Deering	R	IA-04	March 4, 1877	2nd term	
94	Robert H. M. Davidson	D	FL-01	March 4, 1877	2nd term	
95	Horace Davis	R	CA-01	March 4, 1877	2nd term	Left the House in 1881.
96	Henry L. Dickey	D	OH-11	March 4, 1877	2nd term	Left the House in 1881.
97	Jeremiah W. Dwight	R	NY-28	March 4, 1877	2nd term	
98	Joseph Barton Elam	D	LA-04	March 4, 1877	2nd term	Left the House in 1881.
99	Russell Errett	R	PA-22	March 4, 1877	2nd term	
100	Thomas Ewing, Jr.	D	OH-10	March 4, 1877	2nd term	Left the House in 1881.
101	John H. Evins	D	SC-04	March 4, 1877	2nd term	
102	Ebenezer B. Finley	D	OH-08	March 4, 1877	2nd term	Left the House in 1881.
103	Alfred C. Harmer	R	PA-05	March 4, 1877; Previous service, 1871–1875.	4th term*	
104	Dudley C. Haskell	R	KS-02	March 4, 1877	2nd term	
105	Philip C. Hayes	R	IL-07	March 4, 1877	2nd term	Left the House in 1881.
106	George Cochrane Hazelton	R	WI-03	March 4, 1877	2nd term	
107	Daniel Maynadier Henry	D	MD-01	March 4, 1877	2nd term	Left the House in 1881.
108	Hilary A. Herbert	D	AL-02	March 4, 1877	2nd term	
109	Frank Hiscock	R	NY-25	March 4, 1877	2nd term	
110	Herman L. Humphrey	R	WI-07	March 4, 1877	2nd term	
111	Amaziah B. James	R	NY-19	March 4, 1877	2nd term	Left the House in 1881.
112	Joseph Jorgensen	R	VA-04	March 4, 1877	2nd term	
113	J. Warren Keifer	R	OH-04	March 4, 1877	2nd term	
114	John E. Kenna	D	WV-03	March 4, 1877	2nd term	
115	John H. Ketcham	R	NY-13	March 4, 1877; Previous service, 1865–1873.	6th term*	
116	John Weinland Killinger	R	PA-14	March 4, 1877; Previous service, 1859–1863 and 1871–1875.	6th term**	Left the House in 1881.
117	William Kimmel	D	MD-03	March 4, 1877	2nd term	Left the House in 1881.
118	Stephen Lindsey	R	ME-03	March 4, 1877	2nd term	
119	George B. Loring	R	MA-06	March 4, 1877	2nd term	Left the House in 1881.
120	Van H. Manning	D	MS-02	March 4, 1877	2nd term	
121	Benjamin F. Martin	D	WV-02	March 4, 1877	2nd term	Left the House in 1881.
122	Benjamin F. Marsh	R	IL-10	March 4, 1877	2nd term	
123	Anson G. McCook	R	NY-08	March 4, 1877	2nd term	
124	Jonas H. McGowan	R	MI-03	March 4, 1877	2nd term	Left the House in 1881.
125	James A. McKenzie	D	KY-02	March 4, 1877	2nd term	
126	William McKinley	R	OH-16	March 4, 1877	2nd term	
127	John I. Mitchell	R	PA-16	March 4, 1877	2nd term	Left the House in 1881.
128	Leopold Morse	D	MA-04	March 4, 1877	2nd term	
129	Henry L. Muldrow	D	MS-01	March 4, 1877	2nd term	
130	Nicholas Muller	D	NY-05	March 4, 1877	2nd term	Left the House in 1881.
131	Henry S. Neal	R	OH-12	March 4, 1877	2nd term	
132	Amasa Norcross	R	MA-10	March 4, 1877	2nd term	
133	Edward Overton, Jr.	R	PA-15	March 4, 1877	2nd term	Left the House in 1881.
134	Hiram Price	R	IA-02	March 4, 1877; Previous service, 1863–1869.	5th term*	Left the House in 1881.
135	Thaddeus C. Pound	R	WI-08	March 4, 1877	2nd term	
136	Thomas Brackett Reed	R	ME-01	March 4, 1877	2nd term	
137	William W. Rice	R	MA-09	March 4, 1877	2nd term	
138	Edward White Robertson	D	LA-06	March 4, 1877	2nd term	
139	George D. Robinson	R	MA-11	March 4, 1877	2nd term	
140	Thomas Ryan	R	KS-03	March 4, 1877	2nd term	
141	William Fletcher Sapp	R	IA-08	March 4, 1877	2nd term	Left the House in 1881.
142	William Shadrack Shallenberger	R	PA-24	March 4, 1877	2nd term	
143	Charles M. Shelley	D	AL-04	March 4, 1877	2nd term	
144	John H. Starin	R	NY-20	March 4, 1877	2nd term	Left the House in 1881.
145	Walter Leak Steele	D	NC-06	March 4, 1877	2nd term	Left the House in 1881.
146	John W. Stone	R	MI-05	March 4, 1877	2nd term	Left the House in 1881.
147	Amos Townsend	R	OH-20	March 4, 1877	2nd term	
148	Richard W. Townshend	D	IL-19	March 4, 1877	2nd term	
149	Thomas Turner	D	KY-09	March 4, 1877	2nd term	Left the House in 1881.
150	William Ward	R	PA-06	March 4, 1877	2nd term	
151	Harry White	R	PA-25	March 4, 1877	2nd term	Left the House in 1881.
152	Albert S. Willis	D	KY-05	March 4, 1877	2nd term	
153	Edwin Willits	R	MI-02	March 4, 1877	2nd term	
154	Hendrick Bradley Wright	D	PA-12	March 4, 1877; Previous service, 1853–1855 and 1861–1863.	4th term**	Left the House in 1881.
155	Joseph H. Acklen	D	LA-03	February 20, 1878	2nd term	Left the House in 1881.
156	John M. Bailey	R	NY-16	November 5, 1878	2nd term	Left the House in 1881.
157	Richard L.T. Beale	D	VA-01	January 23, 1879; Previous service, 1847–1849.	3rd term*	Left the House in 1881.
158	Nelson W. Aldrich	R	RI-01	March 4, 1879	1st term	
159	John Alexander Anderson	R	KS-01	March 4, 1879	1st term	
160	Robert Franklin Armfield	D	NC-07	March 4, 1879	1st term	
161	Gibson Atherton	D	OH-14	March 4, 1879	1st term	
162	Reuben Knecht Bachman	D	PA-10	March 4, 1879	1st term	Left the House in 1881.
163	Hiram Barber, Jr.	R	IL-03	March 4, 1879	1st term	Left the House in 1881.
164	Bradley Barlow	G	VT-03	March 4, 1879	1st term	Left the House in 1881.
165	James B. Belford	R	CO	March 4, 1879; Previous service, 1876–1877.	3rd term*	
166	Frank Eckels Beltzhoover	D	PA-19	March 4, 1879	1st term	
167	Campbell Polson Berry	D	CA-03	March 4, 1879	1st term	
168	Henry H. Bingham	R	PA-01	March 4, 1879	1st term	
169	John L. Blake	R	NJ-06	March 4, 1879	1st term	Left the House in 1881.
170	Selwyn Z. Bowman	R	MA-05	March 4, 1879	1st term	
171	Lewis A. Brigham	R	NJ-07	March 4, 1879	1st term	Left the House in 1881.
172	Julius C. Burrows	R	MI-04	March 4, 1879; Previous service, 1873–1875.	2nd term*	
173	Benjamin Butterworth	R	OH-01	March 4, 1879	1st term	
174	Cyrus C. Carpenter	R	IA-09	March 4, 1879	1st term	
175	Martin L. Clardy	D	MO-01	March 4, 1879	1st term	
176	Alexander Hamilton Coffroth	D	PA-17	March 4, 1879; Previous service, 1863–1866.	3rd term*	Left the House in 1881.
177	Walpole G. Colerick	D	IN-12	March 4, 1879	1st term	
178	George L. Converse	D	OH-09	March 4, 1879	1st term	
179	Calvin Cowgill	R	IN-11	March 4, 1879	1st term	Left the House in 1881.
180	Richard Crowley	R	NY-31	March 4, 1879	1st term	
181	Rollin M. Daggett	R	NV	March 4, 1879	1st term	Left the House in 1881.
182	George R. Davis	R	IL-02	March 4, 1879	1st term	
183	Lowndes Henry Davis	D	MO-04	March 4, 1879	1st term	
184	Peter V. Deuster	D	WI-04	March 4, 1879	1st term	
185	Samuel Bernard Dick	R	PA-26	March 4, 1879	1st term	Left the House in 1881.
186	Poindexter Dunn	D	AR-01	March 4, 1879	1st term	
187	Edwin Einstein	R	NY-07	March 4, 1879	1st term	Left the House in 1881.
188	Evarts Worcester Farr	R	NH-03	March 4, 1879	1st term	Died on November 30, 1880.
189	John W. Ferdon	R	NY-14	March 4, 1879	1st term	Left the House in 1881.
190	Walbridge A. Field	R	MA-03	March 4, 1879; Previous service, 1877–1878.	2nd term*	Left the House in 1881.
191	Horatio Fisher	R	PA-18	March 4, 1879	1st term	
192	Nicholas Ford	D	MO-09	March 4, 1879	1st term	
193	Albert P. Forsythe	G	IL-15	March 4, 1879	1st term	Left the House in 1881.
194	Richard Graham Frost	D	MO-03	March 4, 1879	1st term	
195	George W. Geddes	D	OH-15	March 4, 1879	1st term	
196	Edward H. Gillette	R	IA-07	March 4, 1879	1st term	Left the House in 1881.
197	William Godshalk	R	PA-07	March 4, 1879	1st term	
198	Joshua G. Hall	R	NH-01	March 4, 1879	1st term	
199	John Hammond	R	NY-18	March 4, 1879	1st term	
200	Nathaniel Job Hammond	D	GA-05	March 4, 1879	1st term	
201	William H. Hatch	D	MO-12	March 4, 1879	1st term	
202	Robert M. A. Hawk	R	IL-05	March 4, 1879	1st term	
203	Joseph Roswell Hawley	R	CT-01	March 4, 1879; Previous service, 1872–1875.	3rd term*	Left the House in 1881.
204	William Heilman	R	IN-01	March 4, 1879	1st term	
205	Thomas H. Herndon	D	AL-01	March 4, 1879	1st term	
206	Roswell G. Horr	R	MI-08	March 4, 1879	1st term	
207	Leonidas C. Houk	R	TN-02	March 4, 1879	1st term	
208	Abraham J. Hostetler	D	IN-08	March 4, 1879	1st term	Left the House in 1881.
209	William D. Hill	D	OH-06	March 4, 1879	1st term	Left the House in 1881.
210	Noble A. Hull	D	FL-02	March 4, 1879	1st term	Resigned on January 22, 1881.
211	Frank H. Hurd	D	OH-07	March 4, 1879; Previous service, 1875–1877.	2nd term*	Left the House in 1881.
212	Joseph E. Johnston	D	VA-03	March 4, 1879	1st term	Left the House in 1881.
213	George W. Jones	D	TX-05	March 4, 1879	1st term	
214	Robert Klotz	D	PA-11	March 4, 1879	1st term	
215	J. Floyd King	D	LA-05	March 4, 1879	1st term	
216	William H. Kitchin	D	NC-02	March 4, 1879	1st term	Left the House in 1881.
217	George W. Ladd	G	ME-04	March 4, 1879	1st term	
218	Alfred Morrison Lay	D	MO-07	March 4, 1879	1st term	Died on December 8, 1879.
219	Benjamin Le Fevre	D	OH-05	March 4, 1879	1st term	
220	Burwell Boykin Lewis	D	AL-06	March 4, 1879; Previous service, 1875–1877.	2nd term*	Resigned on October 1, 1880.
221	William Lounsbery	D	NY-15	March 4, 1879	1st term	Left the House in 1881.
222	William M. Lowe	D	AL-08	March 4, 1879	1st term	Left the House in 1881.
223	Edward L. Martin	D	DE	March 4, 1879	1st term	
224	Joseph John Martin	R	NC-01	March 4, 1879	1st term	Resigned on January 29, 1881.
225	Joseph Mason	R	NY-24	March 4, 1879	1st term	
226	Gilbert De La Matyr	G	IN-07	March 4, 1879	1st term	Left the House in 1881.
227	Moses A. McCoid	R	IA-01	March 4, 1879	1st term	
228	Robert Milligan McLane	D	MD-04	March 4, 1879; Previous service, 1847–1851.	3rd term*	
229	Benton McMillin	D	TN-04	March 4, 1879	1st term	
230	Frederick Miles	R	CT-04	March 4, 1879	1st term	
231	Warner Miller	R	NY-22	March 4, 1879	1st term	
232	Levi P. Morton	R	NY-11	March 4, 1879	1st term	
233	Thompson H. Murch	G	ME-05	March 4, 1879	1st term	
234	William R. Myers	D	IN-06	March 4, 1879	1st term	Left the House in 1881.
235	Jeptha D. New	D	IN-04	March 4, 1879; Previous service, 1875–1877.	2nd term*	Left the House in 1881.
236	John S. Newberry	R	MI-01	March 4, 1879	1st term	Left the House in 1881.
237	John C. Nicholls	D	GA-01	March 4, 1879	1st term	Left the House in 1881.
238	James O'Brien	D	NY-10	March 4, 1879	1st term	Left the House in 1881.
239	Michael P. O'Connor	D	SC-02	March 4, 1879	1st term	
240	Godlove Stein Orth	R	IN-09	March 4, 1879; Previous service, 1863–1871 and 1873–1875.	6th term**	
241	Daniel O'Reilly	D	NY-02	March 4, 1879	1st term	Left the House in 1881.
242	James H. Osmer	R	PA-27	March 4, 1879	1st term	Left the House in 1881.
243	Romualdo Pacheco	R	CA-04	March 4, 1879; Previous service, 1877–1878.	2nd term*	
244	Henry Persons	D	GA-04	March 4, 1879	1st term	Left the House in 1881.
245	Elijah Phister	D	KY-10	March 4, 1879	1st term	
246	Ray V. Pierce	R	NY-32	March 4, 1879	1st term	Resigned on September 18, 1880.
247	Henry Poehler	D	MN-02	March 4, 1879	1st term	Left the House in 1881.
248	Cyrus D. Prescott	R	NY-23	March 4, 1879	1st term	
249	David P. Richardson	R	NY-29	March 4, 1879	1st term	
250	John S. Richardson	D	SC-01	March 4, 1879	1st term	
251	James Buchanan Richmond	D	VA-09	March 4, 1879	1st term	Left the House in 1881.
252	George M. Robeson	R	NJ-01	March 4, 1879	1st term	
253	Gideon Frank Rothwell	D	MO-10	March 4, 1879	1st term	Left the House in 1881.
254	Daniel Lindsay Russell	R	NC-03	March 4, 1879	1st term	Left the House in 1881.
255	William A. Russell	R	MA-07	March 4, 1879	1st term	
256	John Walker Ryon	D	PA-13	March 4, 1879	1st term	Left the House in 1881.
257	William J. Samford	D	AL-03	March 4, 1879	1st term	Left the House in 1881.
258	Samuel Locke Sawyer	D	MO-08	March 4, 1879	1st term	Left the House in 1881.
259	John C. Sherwin	R	IL-04	March 4, 1879	1st term	
260	Charles Bryson Simonton	D	TN-09	March 4, 1879	1st term	
261	James W. Singleton	D	IL-11	March 4, 1879	1st term	
262	Hezekiah Bradley Smith	D	NJ-02	March 4, 1879	1st term	Left the House in 1881.
263	Emory Speer	D	GA-09	March 4, 1879	1st term	
264	Adlai Stevenson I	D	IL-13	March 4, 1879; Previous service, 1875–1877.	2nd term*	Left the House in 1881.
265	Joshua Frederick Cockey Talbott	D	MD-02	March 4, 1879	1st term	
266	Robert L. Taylor	D	TN-01	March 4, 1879	1st term	Left the House in 1881.
267	John R. Thomas	R	IL-18	March 4, 1879	1st term	
268	Philip B. Thompson, Jr.	D	KY-08	March 4, 1879	1st term	
269	George D. Tillman	D	SC-05	March 4, 1879	1st term	
270	Oscar Turner	D	KY-01	March 4, 1879	1st term	
271	James Manning Tyler	R	VT-02	March 4, 1879	1st term	
272	Jonathan T. Updegraff	R	OH-18	March 4, 1879	1st term	
273	Thomas Updegraff	R	IA-03	March 4, 1879	1st term	
274	Milton Urner	R	MD-06	March 4, 1879	1st term	
275	Edward K. Valentine	R	NE	March 4, 1879	1st term	
276	Henry Van Aernam	R	NY-33	March 4, 1879; Previous service, 1865–1869.	3rd term*	
277	Charles H. Voorhis	R	NJ-05	March 4, 1879	1st term	Left the House in 1881.
278	John Van Voorhis	R	NY-30	March 4, 1879	1st term	Left the House in 1881.
279	James Richard Waddill	D	MO-06	March 4, 1879	1st term	Left the House in 1881.
280	Adoniram J. Warner	D	OH-13	March 4, 1879	1st term	Left the House in 1881.
281	William D. Washburn	R	MN-03	March 4, 1879	1st term	
282	James B. Weaver	R	IA-06	March 4, 1879	1st term	Left the House in 1881.
283	Olin Wellborn	D	TX-03	March 4, 1879	1st term	
284	Erastus Wells	D	MO-02	March 4, 1879; Previous service, 1869–1877.	5th term*	Left the House in 1881.
285	John Whiteaker	D	OR	March 4, 1879	1st term	Left the House in 1881.
286	David Wilber	R	NY-21	March 4, 1879; Previous service, 1873–1875.	2nd term*	Left the House in 1881.
287	Thomas Williams	D	AL-05	March 4, 1879	1st term	
288	Morgan Ringland Wise	D	PA-21	March 4, 1879	1st term	
289	Walter A. Wood	R	NY-17	March 4, 1879	1st term	
290	Seth Hartman Yocum	G	PA-20	March 4, 1879	1st term	Left the House in 1881.
291	Thomas L. Young	R	OH-02	March 4, 1879	1st term	
	Christopher C. Upson	D	TX-06	April 15, 1879	1st term	
	Waldo Hutchins	D	NY-12	November 4, 1879	1st term	
	William George Thompson	R	IA-05	December 1, 1879	1st term	
	John Finis Philips	D	MO-07	January 10, 1880; Previous service, 1875–1877.	2nd term*	Left the House in 1881.
	Jonathan Scoville	D	NY-32	November 12, 1880	1st term	
	Newton Nash Clements	D	AL-06	December 8, 1880	1st term	Left the House in 1881.
	Ezra B. Taylor	R	OH-19	December 13, 1880	1st term	
	Ossian Ray	R	NH-03	January 8, 1881	1st term	
	Horatio Bisbee, Jr.	R	FL-02	January 22, 1881; Previous service, 1877–1879.	2nd term*	Left the House in 1881.
	Jesse Johnson Yeates	D	NC-01	January 29, 1881; Previous service, 1875–1879.	3rd term*	Left the House in 1881.

== Delegates ==
Rank	Delegate	Party	District	Seniority date (Previous service, if any)	No.# of term(s)	Notes
1	George Q. Cannon	R	UT	March 4, 1873	4th term	
2	Martin Maginnis	D	MT	March 4, 1873	4th term	
3	George Ainslie	D	ID	March 4, 1879	1st term	
4	Granville G. Bennett	R	DAK	March 4, 1879	1st term	
5	Thomas Hurley Brents	R	WA	March 4, 1879	1st term	
6	John G. Campbell	D	AZ	March 4, 1879	1st term	
7	Mariano S. Otero	R	NM	March 4, 1879	1st term	
8	Stephen Wheeler Downey	R	WY	March 4, 1879	1st term	

== See also ==
- 46th United States Congress
- List of United States congressional districts
- List of United States senators in the 46th Congress
