= South Building (disambiguation) =

The South Building is a skyscraper in New York City, United States.

South Building may also refer to:

- Bronx Terminal Market#South building, New York City, US
- Peace Hotel#South Building, Shanghai, China
- William G. Davis Building (formerly known as the South Building), University of Toronto Mississauga, Ontario, Canada
- South Building, Wellington Hospital, London, England
- United States Department of Agriculture South Building Washington, DC, United States
