= U.S. Department of Agriculture Cotton Annex =

Apartment building in Washington, D.C.

- U.S. National Register of Historic Places
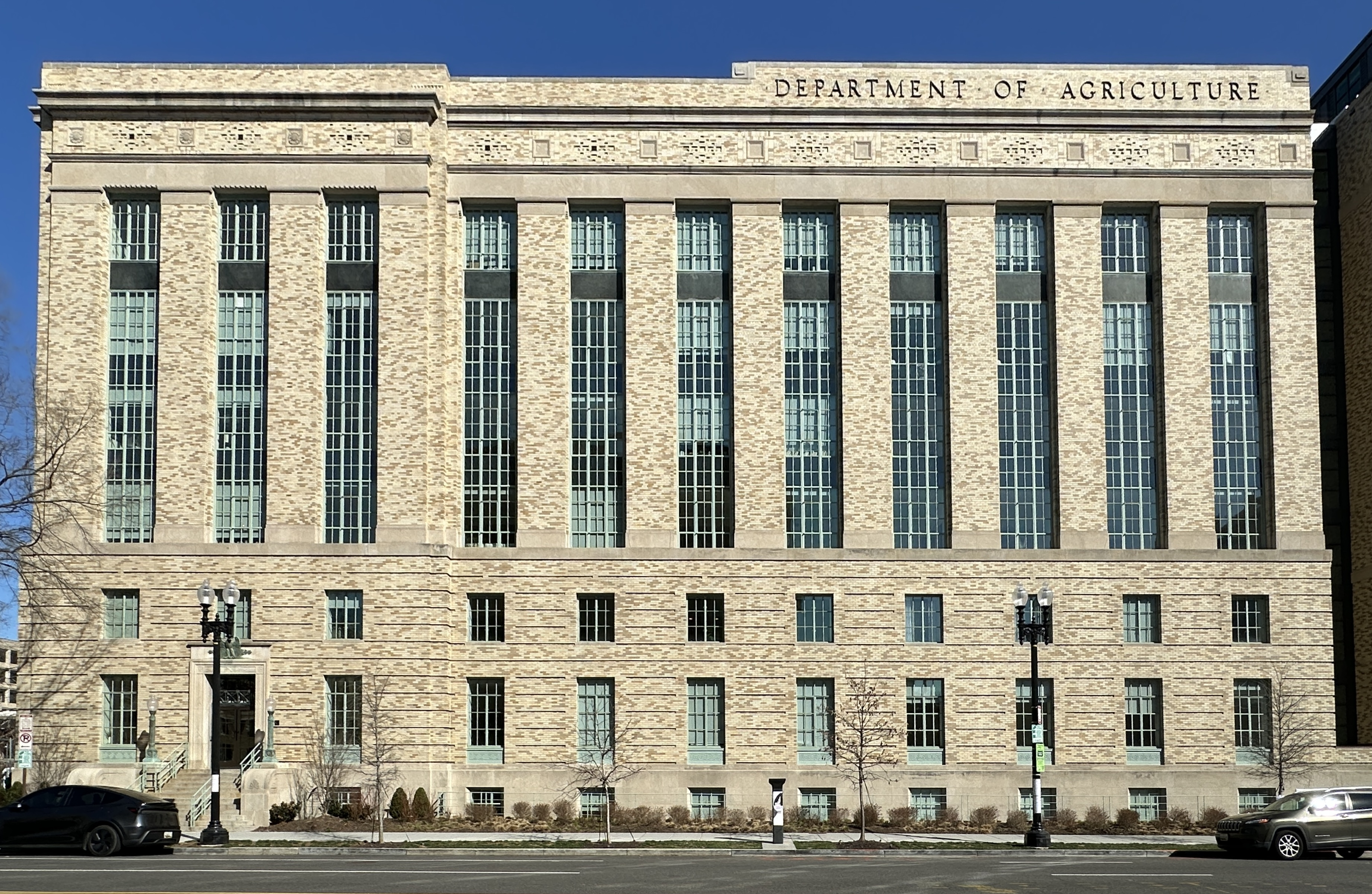
- U.S. Department of Agriculture Cotton Annex in 2026

- Location within Central Washington, D.C. Location within the District of Columbia Location within the United States
- Location: 300 12th Street, S.W. Washington, D.C.
- Coordinates: 38°53′8″N 77°01′40″W
- Built: 1937
- Architect: Louis A. Simon
- Architectural style: Modern Movement, Stripped Classicism
- NRHP reference No.: 15000683
- Added to NRHP: October 5, 2015

The U.S. Department of Agriculture Cotton Annex is a former office building located at 300 12th Street SW in Southwest Federal Center, Washington, D.C. The size of the building has been variously given at 89,000 square feet and 118,000 square feet. In 2024, it was converted into an apartment building and renamed Annex on 12th.

== Construction and government use ==
The Cotton Annex was built from 1936 and 1937 for the United States Department of Agriculture (USDA). The building was originally for offices and laboratories of the USDA's Bureau of Agricultural Economics (BAE), which was previously housed in headquarters that were being demolished as part of the expansion of the Bureau of Engraving and Printing. The site selected for the Cotton Annex was in accordance with the 1901 McMillan Plan. Funds for the construction were appropriated by Congress in the Public Buildings Act of 1926.

The Cotton Annex was designed by the Supervising Architect of the Treasury, Louis A. Simon. It is a six-story brick building in the Stripped Classical architectural style. The Cotton Annex "has distinctive walls of variegated buff-colored brick laid in an all-stretcher bond, and is covered with a flat roof with limestone coping and a tall parapet roof on the west and north elevations."

The Cotton Annex was the headquarters of the USDA Cotton Division from the building's completion until 1964, when the Cotton Division's Standards section moved to Memphis, Tennessee. Other USDA divisions moved into the empty laboratory space, and other offices of the Cotton Division remained in the Cotton Annex until 1982.

In 1982, the General Services Administration (GSA) acquired ownership of the building. The USDA vacated the building in 2007, giving maintenance and repair responsibilities to the GSA. In October 2007, the GSA and the Federal Protective Service (FPS) entered an agreement for the FPS to use land on the Cotton Annex complex as a screening facility for inspection of trucks making deliveries to the Ronald Reagan Building and International Trade Center.

== Sale and residential conversion ==
In May 2007, the Subcommittee on Economic Development, Public Buildings and Emergency Management of the United States House Committee on Transportation and Infrastructure held a "field hearing" at the Cotton Annex. Chairman John Mica of Florida, a Republican, pressured the GSA to sell the building. GSA Public Buildings Service Commissioner Bob Peck testified that although the complex's operation costs are $279,000, the FPS covers those costs as part of the rental agreement for the property.

In April 2014, GSA Administrator Dan Tangherlini proposed making a deal with developers to trade the Cotton Annex and the GSA's own regional headquarters in exchange for work on the GSA's main headquarters and the long-delayed Department of Homeland Security consolidation project, a project to build a new consolidated DHS headquarters at the former St. Elizabeths Hospital site in Southwest DC.

In February 2017, Douglas Development Corporation bought the Cotton Annex with a bid of $30.3 million. In 2021, the structure was sold for $45 million to developer Carmel Partners, who subsequently converted it into a luxury apartment building. Named Annex on 12th, the building began leasing in 2024. The new structure contains 562 units, 97 of which are within the original Cotton Annex.

== See also ==
- National Register of Historic Places listings in the District of Columbia
- Jamie L. Whitten Building
- United States Department of Agriculture South Building
