= Southwest Federal Center =

Neighborhood of Washington, D.C.

- Neighborhood of Washington, D.C.
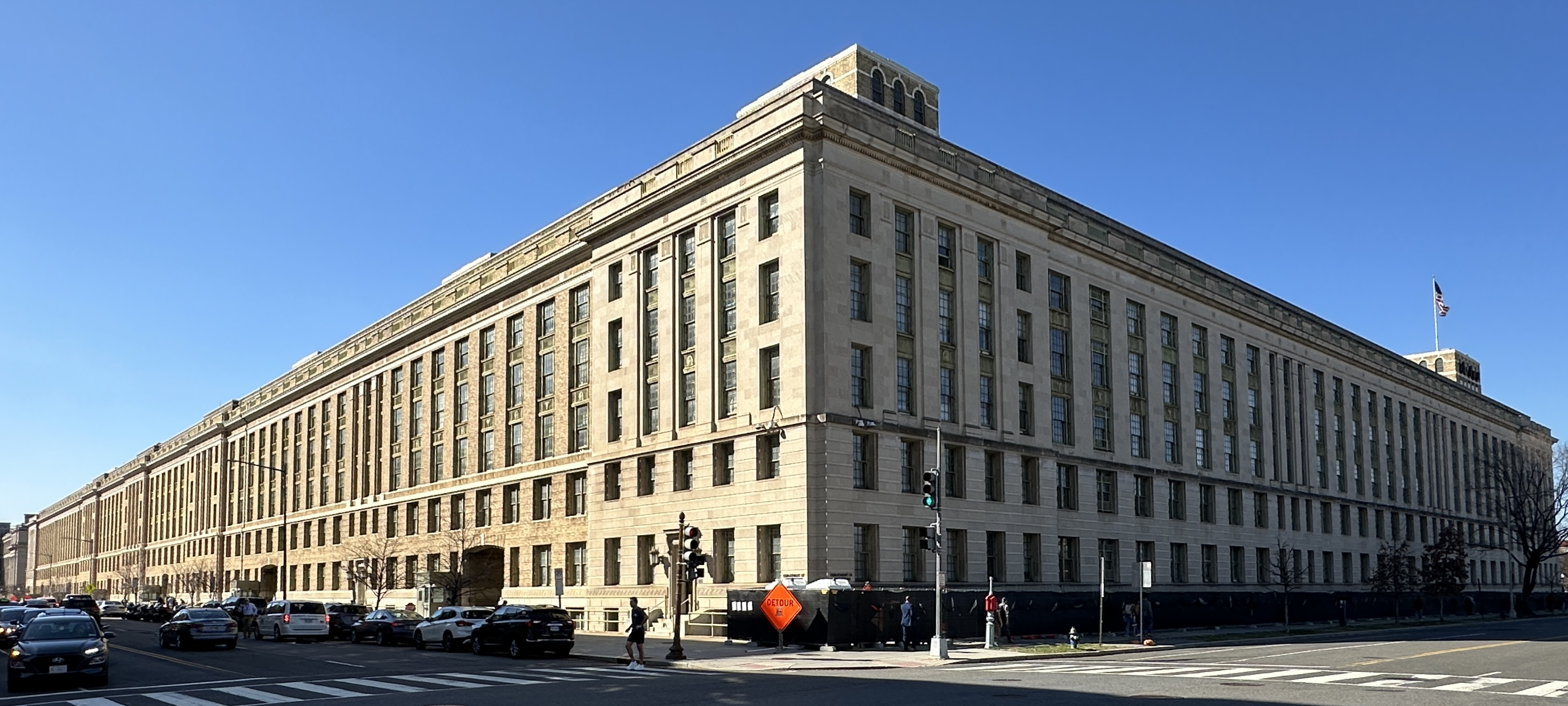
- U.S. Department of Agriculture South Building, listed on the National Register of Historic Places

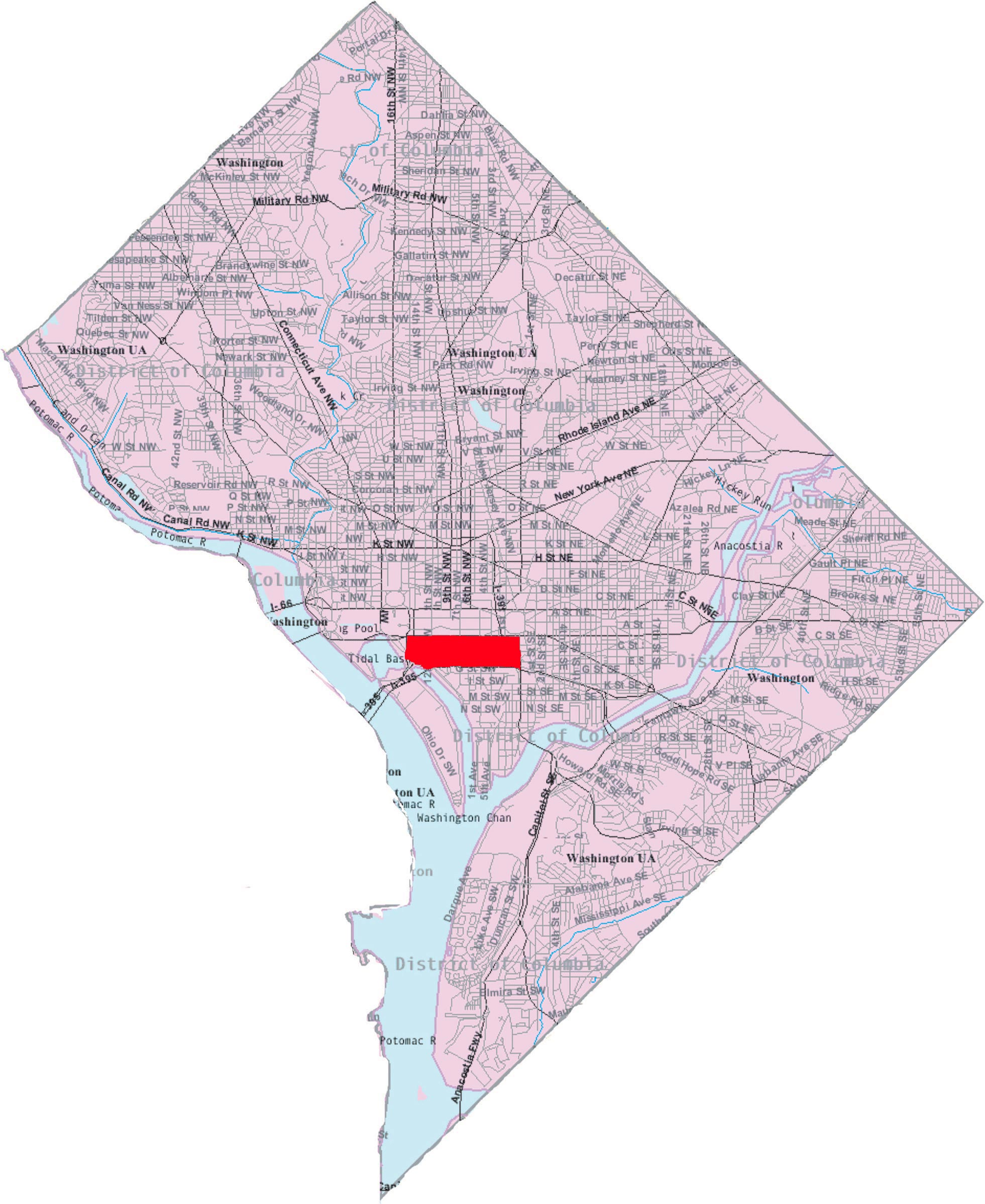
- Southwest Federal Center within the District of Columbia
- Coordinates: 38.885861°N 77.015194°W
- Country: United States
- District: Washington, D.C.
- Ward: Ward 2

Government
  - Councilmember: Brooke Pinto
- Elevation: 25 ft (7.6 m)
- Postal code: ZIP code

Southwest Federal Center is a business district in Southwest Washington, D.C., nearly entirely occupied by offices for various branches of the U.S. Government, including many of the museums of the Smithsonian Institution.

Southwest Federal Center lies between Independence Avenue and the National Mall immediately to the north, the Southeast-Southwest Freeway (Interstate 395) and the Washington Channel to the south, South Capitol Street to the east, and 15th Street SW (Raoul Wallenberg Place) to the west.

Several U.S. Cabinet Departments and agencies have headquarters or large office complexes in the area, including the Agriculture (Jamie L. Whitten Building, the former Cotton Annex, and a building dedicated to the Forest Service), HUD (Robert C. Weaver Federal Building), Health and Human Services (Hubert H. Humphrey Building and Mary E. Switzer Memorial Building), Education (Lyndon Baines Johnson Department of Education Building), and Energy (James V. Forrestal Building) Departments, the Federal Aviation Administration (Orville Wright Federal Building), NASA Headquarters, Bureau of Engraving and Printing, Federal Housing Finance Agency (Constitution Center), and Voice of America (Wilbur J. Cohen Federal Building). The most prominent are the Department of Agriculture, which is housed in a neoclassical building complex that lines both sides of Independence Avenue, and the arcing high-rise of HUD, which is characterized by a unique installation of illuminated fiberglass rings in its 7th Street plaza.

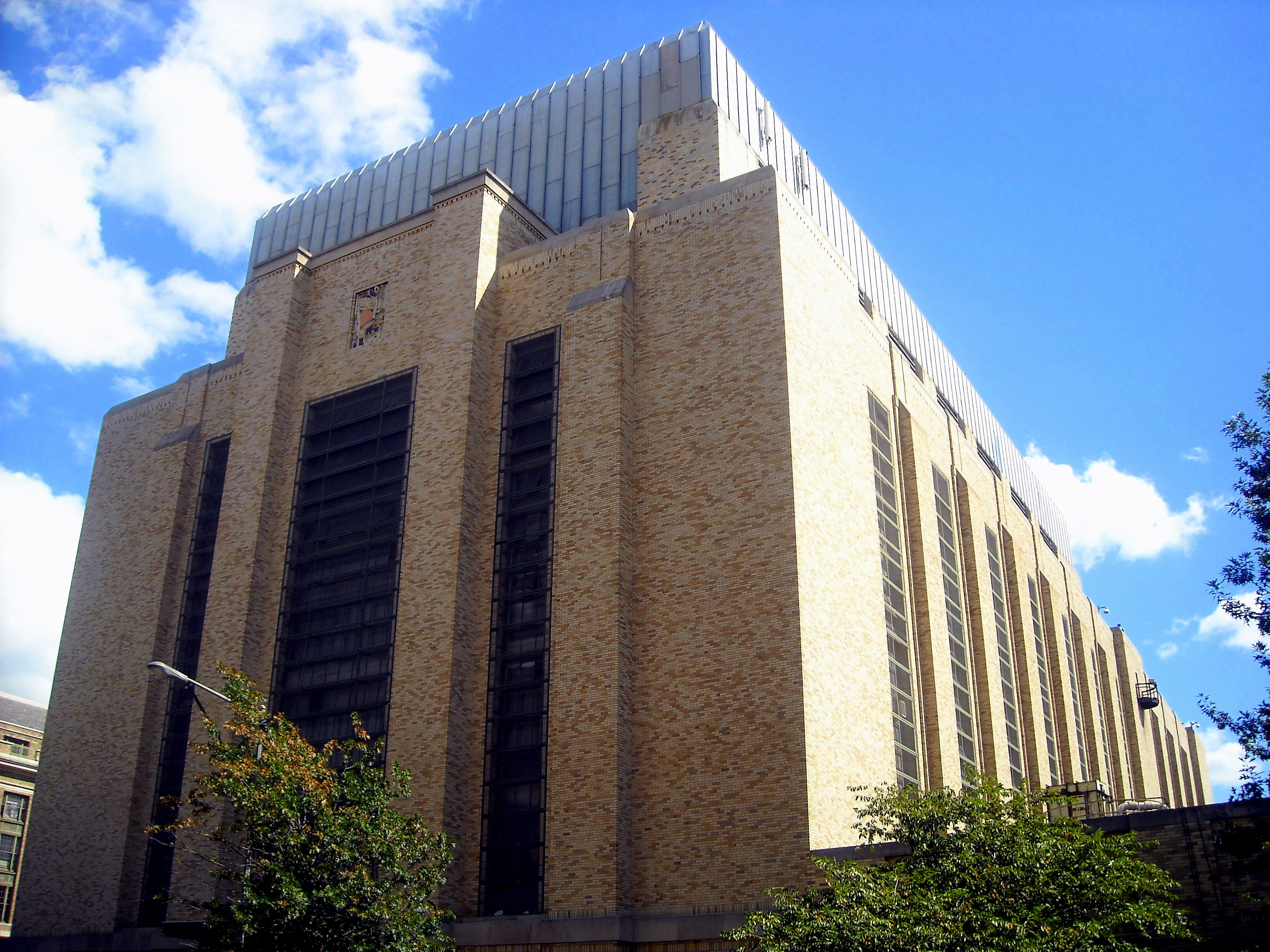
Central Heating Plant for the government offices in Southwest Federal Center

The office buildings for the U.S. House of Representatives are on the south side of the U.S. Capitol; two of these, the O'Neill and Ford House Office Buildings, are located in Southwest Federal Center between 2nd and 3rd Street SW.

The Smithsonian museums in Southwest Federal Center include the Hirshhorn Museum, the National Air and Space Museum, and the Museum of the American Indian, the Freer and Sackler galleries, the National Museum of African Art, and the Arts and Industries Building, as well as the Smithsonian Castle that forms the main offices for the Institution. The United States Holocaust Memorial Museum and International Spy Museum, though not affiliated with the Smithsonian, are also located in the vicinity, as are the Dwight D. Eisenhower Memorial and American Veterans Disabled for Life Memorial.

The few non-governmental businesses in the neighborhood include five hotels, St. Dominic's Catholic Church, a few restaurants, the Central Heating Plant, the First District police station, and commercial spaces (e.g., convenience stores, bank branches, coffee shops, etc.) in the lobbies of the hotels and office buildings. Also, L'Enfant Plaza, a multi-building complex and promenade that includes both government and civilian offices (as well as an indoor shopping mall), is located off Independence Avenue.

== Transportation ==
The Southwest Federal Center is served by the Smithsonian and Federal Center SW Metro stations on the Orange, Blue, and Silver Lines, and by the L'Enfant Plaza station on the Green, Yellow, Silver, Orange, and Blue Lines.

== See also ==
- List of neighborhoods in Washington, D.C.
- Federal Triangle
