= Charles Coleman Thach =

President of Alabama Polytechnic Institute

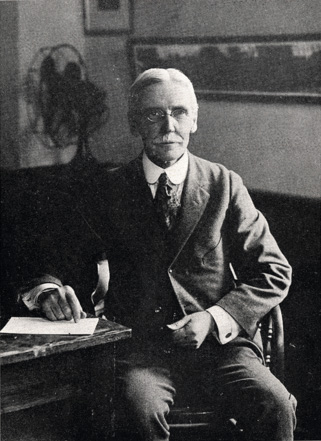
- Thach pictured in The Glomerata 1919, Auburn yearbook

President of Auburn University
- In office 1902–1920
- Preceded by: William Leroy Broun
- Succeeded by: Spright Dowell

Personal details
- Born: March 15, 1860 Athens, Alabama, US
- Died: October 3, 1921 (aged 61) Dalton, Georgia, US

Charles Coleman Thach (March 15, 1860 – October 3, 1921) was the President of Alabama Polytechnic Institute, now known as Auburn University, from 1902 to 1920.

== Biography ==
Charles Coleman Thach was born in Athens, Alabama, in 1860. He graduated from the Agricultural and Mechanical College of Alabama, now known as Auburn University, in 1877. He became a Professor of English in 1885. He was also teaching Political Economy. He was President in the same institution from 1902 to 1920.

He was a member of the American Economic Association. He was a founding member of the Alabama Library Association.

Thach was the father of historian Charles C. Thach, Jr. (1894–1966), who wrote The Creation of the Presidency, 1775–1789: A Study of Constitutional History.

Thach died in Dalton, Georgia, on October 3, 1921.

Academic offices
Preceded by William Leroy Broun	President of Auburn University; 1902–1920	Succeeded by Spright Dowell
