= Bradford Knapp =

Former college president (1870–1938)

- Bradford pictured in The Glomerata 1929, Auburn yearbook

President of the Oklahoma State University
- In office 1923–1928
- Preceded by: George Wilson
- Succeeded by: Henry G. Bennett

President of the Auburn University
- In office 1928–1933
- Preceded by: Spright Dowell
- Succeeded by: Luther Duncan

President of the Texas Tech University
- In office 1932–1938
- Preceded by: Paul W. Horn
- Succeeded by: Clifford B. Jones

Personal details
- Born: December 24, 1870 Vinton, Iowa, U.S.
- Died: June 11, 1938 (aged 67) Lubbock, Texas, U.S.
- Education: University of Michigan

Bradford Knapp (December 24, 1870 – June 11, 1938) was the President of the Alabama Polytechnic Institute, now known as Auburn University from 1928 to 1933.

== Biography ==
Bradford Knapp was born in Vinton, Iowa, on December 24, 1870, to Seaman A. Knapp. In 1899, he attended Iowa State College and graduated with a B.A. in chemistry from Vanderbilt University in 1892. In 1894, he attended Georgetown University and received a B.L. from the University of Michigan in 1896. In 1909, he worked as an assistant for his father in the Bureau of Plant Industry of the United States Department of Agriculture. From 1911 to 1915, he took up his father's position as Chief of Farm Demonstration Work. In 1915, he became Chief of Southern Extension Work for the States Relations Service of the USDA.

In 1920, he became Dean of the College of Agriculture at the University of Arkansas. From 1923 to 1928, he served as President of the Oklahoma Agricultural and Mechanical College, now known as Oklahoma State University. He also served as the President of the Alabama Polytechnic Institute, now known as Auburn University from 1928 to 1933. From 1933 to 1938, he served as the president of Texas Technological College, now known as Texas Tech University.

He served on the National Council of Boy Scouts of America, the Federal Farm Board, and the National Economic League. He wrote for the Progressive Farmer.
