= Francis W. Palmer =

American politician (1827–1907)

Francis Wayland Palmer
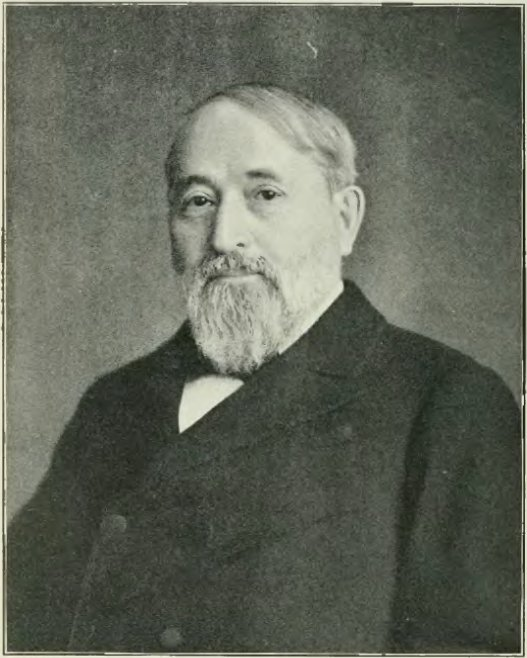

5th and 7th Public Printer of the United States
- In office 1897–1905
- President: William McKinley; Theodore Roosevelt
- Preceded by: Thomas E. Benedict
- Succeeded by: Charles A. Stillings
- In office 1889–1894
- President: Benjamin Harrison; Grover Cleveland
- Preceded by: Thomas E. Benedict
- Succeeded by: Thomas E. Benedict

Postmaster of Chicago
- In office 1877–1885
- Appointed by: Rutherford B. Hayes
- Preceded by: John McArthur
- Succeeded by: S. Corning Judd

Member of the U.S. House of Representatives from Iowa's 5th district
- In office March 4, 1869 – March 3, 1873
- Preceded by: Grenville M. Dodge
- Succeeded by: James Wilson

Member of the New York State Assembly from the Chautauqua County, 2nd district
- In office January 1, 1854 – December 31, 1855
- Preceded by: Jeremiah Ellsworth
- Succeeded by: Smith Berry

Personal details
- Born: October 11, 1827 North Manchester, Indiana, U.S.
- Died: December 3, 1907 (aged 80) Chicago, Illinois, U.S.
- Party: Republican

Francis Wayland Palmer (October 11, 1827 – December 3, 1907) was an American politician, publisher, printer, editor and proprietor from New York, Iowa and Illinois.

== Early life and education ==
Born in North Manchester, Indiana, Palmer moved to Jamestown, New York with his parents as a child and learned the printing trade at the Jamestown Journal in 1841.

== Career ==
Palmer became the owner of the newspaper in 1848 and was a member of the New York State Assembly (Chautauqua Co, 2nd D.) in 1854 and 1855. He sold the Jamestown Journal in 1858 and moved to Dubuque, Iowa the same year where he became editor and one of the proprietors of the Dubuque Times. Palmer served as Iowa state printer from 1861 to 1869, moved to Des Moines, Iowa in 1861 and was publisher and owner of the Iowa State Register. He was elected a Republican to the United States House of Representatives in 1868, serving from 1869 to 1873, not being a candidate for renomination in 1872. He moved to Chicago, Illinois in 1873 and purchased an interest in the Inter-Ocean, becoming its editor-in-chief. Palmer was a delegate to the Republican National Convention in 1876, was appointed postmaster of Chicago by President Rutherford B. Hayes in 1877, serving until 1885 and served as Public Printer of the United States from 1889 to 1894 and again from 1897 to 1905.

== Personal life ==
Palmer died in Chicago, Illinois on December 3, 1907, and was interred in Graceland Cemetery in Chicago.

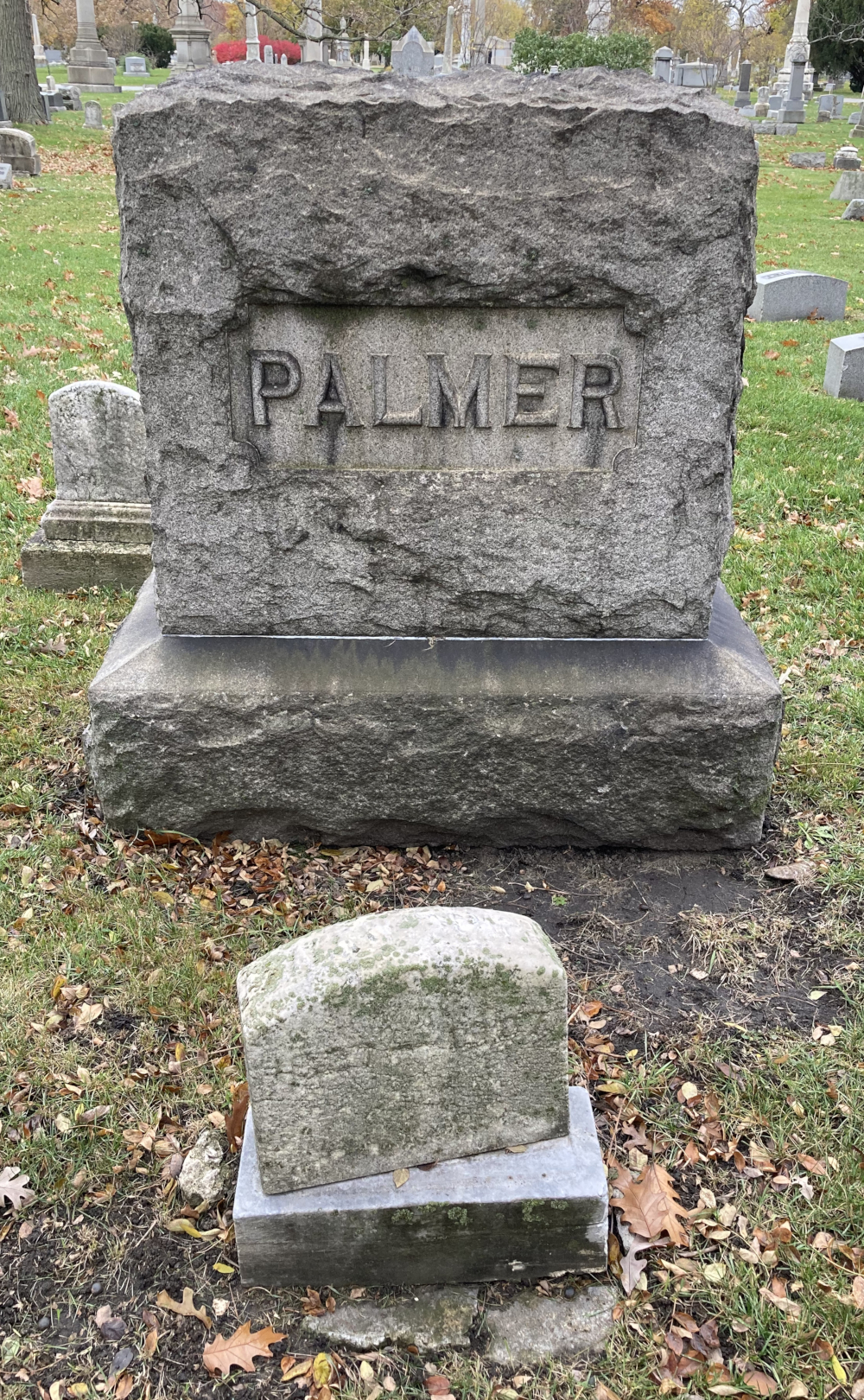
Palmer's grave

New York State Assembly
Preceded by Jeremiah Ellsworth	New York State Assembly; Chautauqua County, 2nd District; 1854–1855	Succeeded by Smith Berry
U.S. House of Representatives
Preceded by Grenville M. Dodge	Member of the U.S. House of Representatives from Iowa's 5th congressional district March 4, 1869 – March 3, 1873	Succeeded by James Wilson
