= James Wilson (secretary of agriculture) =

American politician (1835–1920)

Jim Wilson
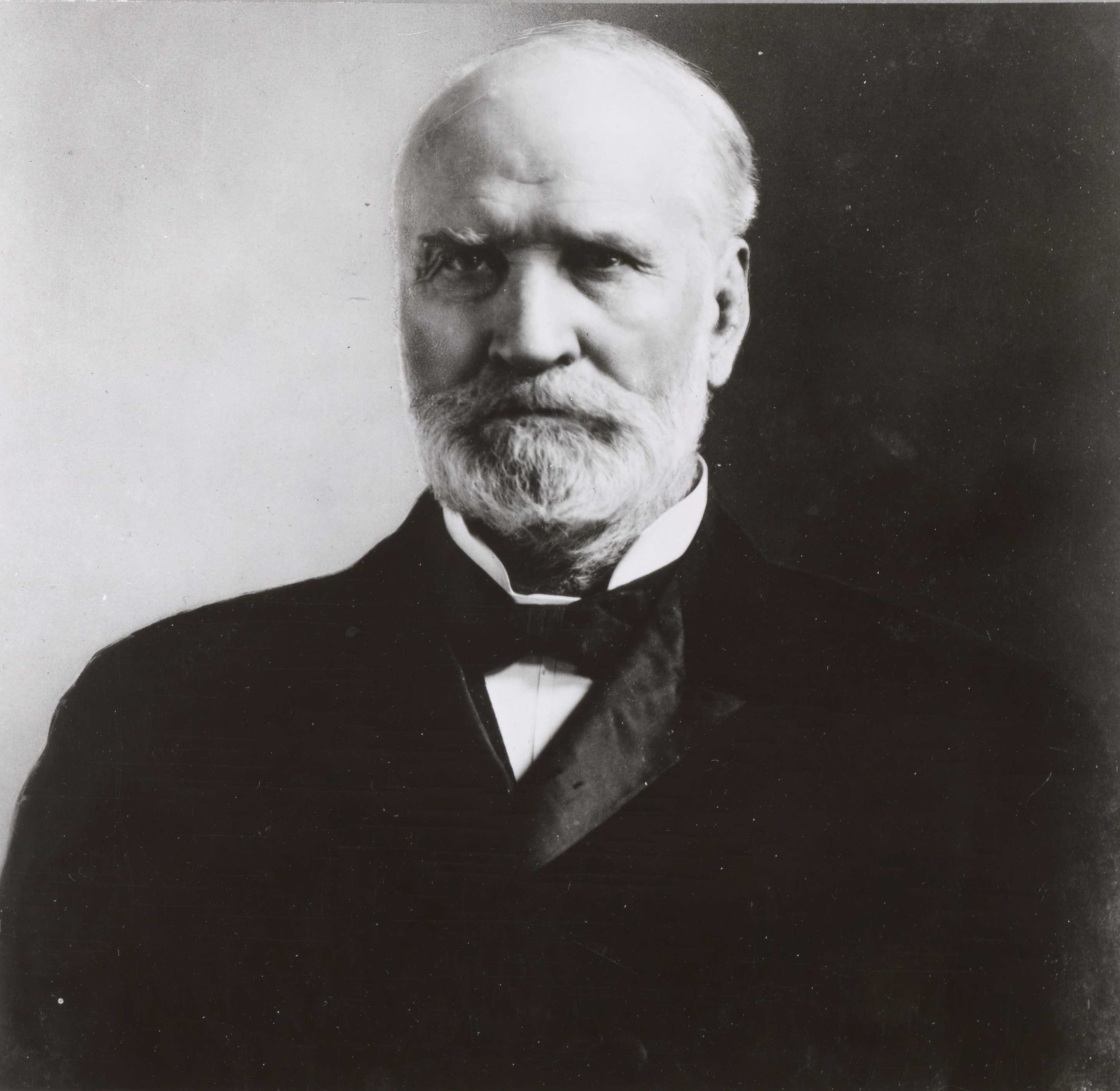
- Wilson c. 1910–20

4th United States Secretary of Agriculture
- In office March 6, 1897 – March 3, 1913
- President: William McKinley; Theodore Roosevelt; William Howard Taft
- Preceded by: Julius Morton
- Succeeded by: David Houston

Member of the U.S. House of Representatives from Iowa's 5th district
- In office March 4, 1883 – March 3, 1885
- Preceded by: William George Thompson
- Succeeded by: Benjamin T. Frederick
- In office March 4, 1873 – March 3, 1877
- Preceded by: Francis W. Palmer
- Succeeded by: Rush Clark

Speaker of the Iowa House of Representatives
- In office 1872–1873
- Preceded by: Aylett R. Cotton
- Succeeded by: John H. Gear

Personal details
- Born: August 16, 1835 Ayrshire, Scotland
- Died: August 26, 1920 (aged 85) Traer, Iowa, U.S.
- Party: Republican
- Spouse: Esther Wilbur (m. 1863–1892)
- Children: 6
- Education: Grinnell College

James "Tama Jim" Wilson (August 16, 1835 – August 26, 1920) was an American politician who served as United States secretary of agriculture for sixteen years during three presidencies, from 1897 to 1913. He holds the record as the longest serving United States Cabinet member.

== Personal background and family ==
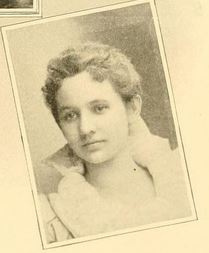
Flora Hanna Wilson

Wilson was born in Ayrshire, Scotland, on August 16, 1835. One of 14 children, he grew up in a farming community near the birthplace of Robert Burns.

His family emigrated to America in 1852, settling in Connecticut before moving to Iowa in 1855, establishing a farm near Traer in Tama County. He attended the public schools and Iowa College (now Grinnell College) in Grinnell, Iowa. He married Esther Wilbur in May 1863. Together they had six children: Esther May, Peter McCosh, Flora Hanna, John Ward, George Wright and Jasper Abijah. Esther died on August 3, 1892; Wilson remained a widower for the remainder of his life.

== Elective office ==
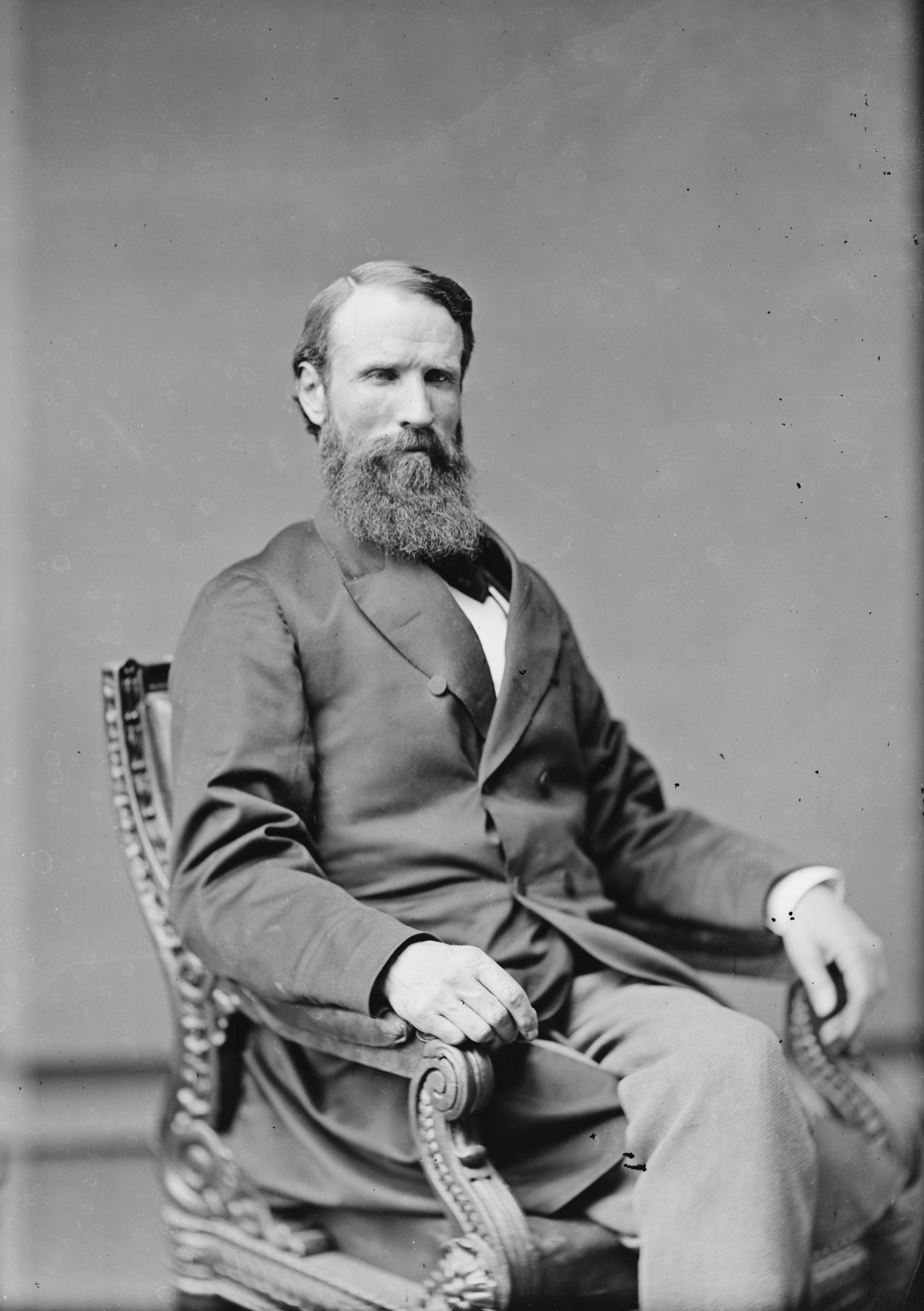
Representative James Wilson

Wilson was elected to the Iowa House of Representatives in 1867, and served as speaker from 1870 to 1871 before becoming a professor of agriculture at what is now Iowa State University, where he encouraged the work of George Washington Carver. Wilson was also appointed to the Board of Trustees (now Regents) of Iowa's public higher educational institutions, serving from 1870 to 1874.

In 1872, he was elected to represent Iowa's 5th congressional district as a Republican member of the United States House of Representatives. It was during this time that he became known as Tama Jim to distinguish him from the Iowa member of the senate, James F. Wilson. In 1874, Wilson was re-elected, serving a second term, but returned to Iowa in 1877. That year he was appointed to the Iowa State Railway Commission, where he served for six years.

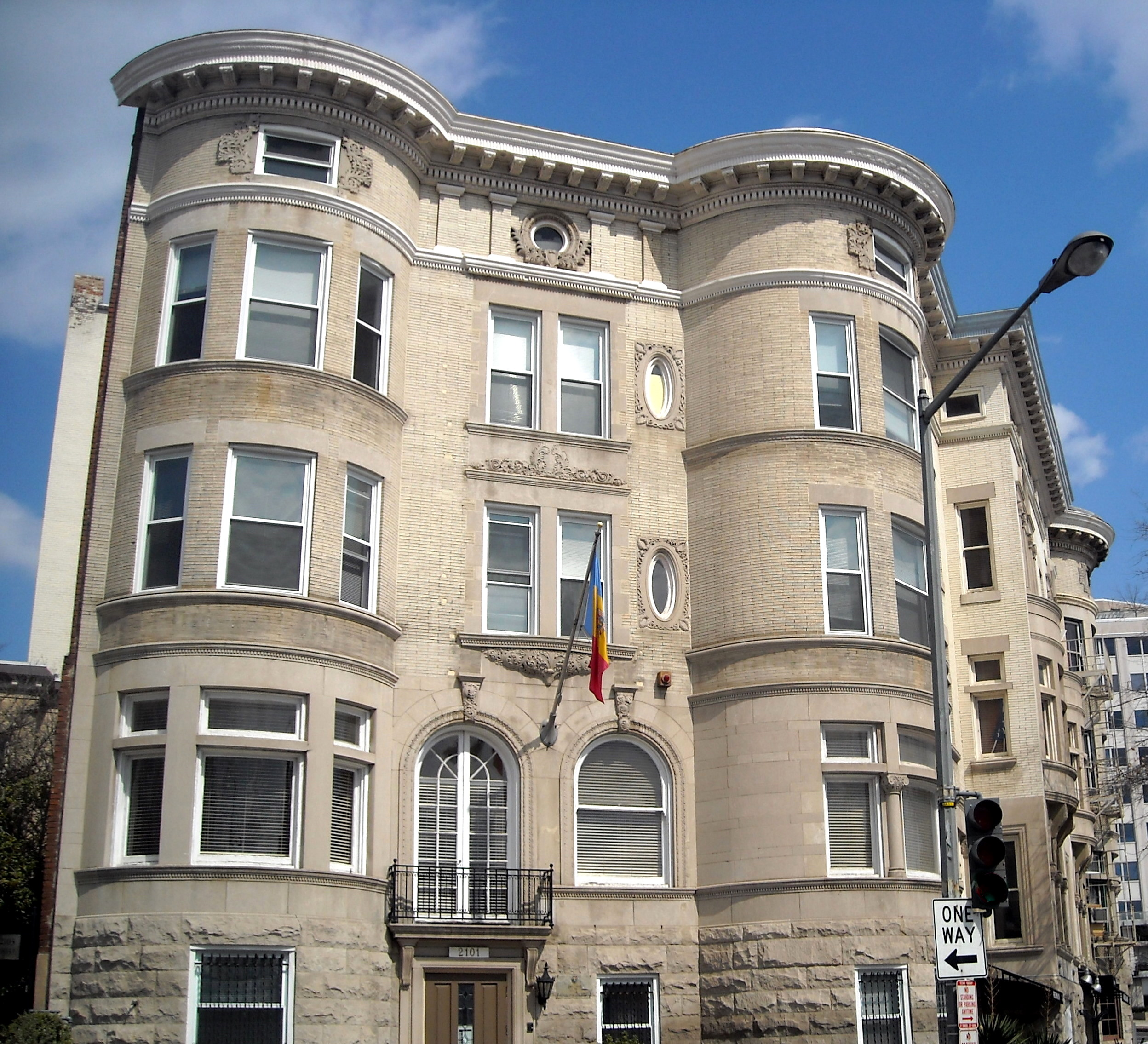
Wilson's former home in Washington, D.C.

In 1882, he ran for Congress for the third time, this time against Democrat Benjamin T. Frederick. Wilson seemingly defeated Frederick in a very close race, but Frederick soon contested the election in the U.S. House. Wilson had been issued an election certificate by the State of Iowa, enabling him to be seated during the contest. The 1882 elections gave Frederick's Democratic Party control of the House.

Through a prolonged evidentiary proceeding in 1883, followed by filibusters that delayed resolution of the contest until the final hours of the Forty-eighth Congress, Wilson's Republican Party colleagues enabled him to retain in office until the final minutes before the end of the final session. Then, Wilson consented to end the filibuster against a vote on the contest, because it was also blocking action on a popular bill to enable former President Ulysses S. Grant to enjoy the financial benefits of a military retirement. On March 4, 1885, with Grover Cleveland's inauguration festivities already starting, the House declared Frederick the winner of the 1882 race, unseated Wilson, seated Frederick, passed the Grant retirement bill, then adjourned. Returning to Iowa from Washington for the second time, Wilson rejoined the faculty at Iowa State, where he would serve as Professor (now Dean) of Agriculture and director of the agricultural experiment station from 1890 to 1897.

== Secretary of Agriculture ==
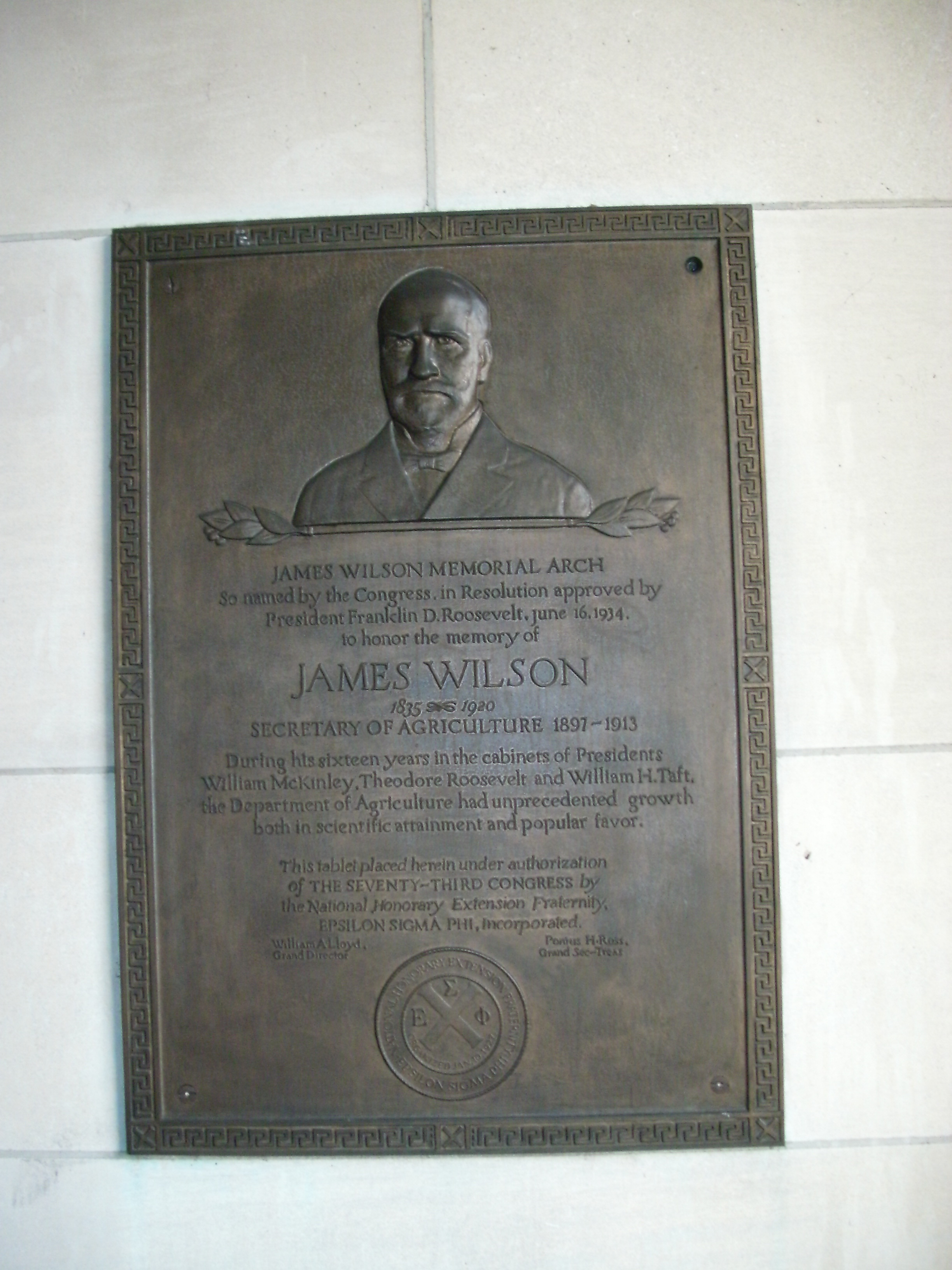
Plaque to Wilson inside the USDA Building, where a pedestrian arch is named for him

Wilson rose to national prominence in early 1897 when newly elected President William McKinley nominated him as his Secretary for Agriculture. During sixteen consecutive years of Republican administrations, Presidents McKinley, Theodore Roosevelt and William Howard Taft retained him in that position. It was not until March 1913, with the inauguration of a Democratic president (Woodrow Wilson), that Wilson left that office. In all, Wilson served as Secretary of Agriculture from March 6, 1897 to March 5, 1913—the longest duration served by any American cabinet official. The length of Wilson's tenure is attributed to not only the same political party occupying the White House in three consecutive administrations, but also the similarity in political philosophy among the three presidents under which Wilson served.

His tenure as Secretary of Agriculture is known as a period of modernization of agricultural methods. He also organized greater food inspection methods, as well as great improvement of many roads across the country.

On the other hand, Wilson spent most of his long tenure attempting to limit the regulatory impact of the pure food movement, which had led to Congress's adoption of the Food and Drugs Act of 1906. Frequently siding with incumbent business interests, Wilson consistently worked against issues pursued by his striving chief chemist, Harvey Wiley, who enjoyed a powerful grassroots following. These matters typically concerned the safety of food additives, their testing, and enforcement of the legislation.

== Later life, death and legacy ==
After leaving office at age 78, Wilson retired in Iowa. He died in Traer, Iowa on August 26, 1920, ten days after celebrating his 85th birthday. He was interred next to his wife in Buckingham Cemetery, Traer, Iowa.

Wilson Hall, a residence hall at Iowa State University, was named in his honor, as was Washington State University's Wilson Hall (renamed Wilson-Short Hall in 2009), originally built as the college's agriculture building. His home, The Farm House (Knapp–Wilson House), now on the Iowa State University campus grounds, has been a National Historic Landmark since 1964 and opened as The Farm Museum in 1976. Wilson has also been commemorated in Washington, D.C. by a bridge linking the U.S. Department of Agriculture Administration Building to the U.S. Department of Agriculture South Building across Independence Avenue. In 1943, retired USDA artist Royal Charles Steadman painted a portrait of Wilson and gave the portrait to the department to hang in the Wilson arch between the Administration and South buildings.

== See also ==
- List of foreign-born United States Cabinet members
- List of United States Cabinet members who have served more than eight years

U.S. House of Representatives
Preceded by Francis W. Palmer	Member of the U.S. House of Representatives from Iowa's 5th congressional district 1873–1877	Succeeded by Rush Clark
Preceded by William G. Thompson	Member of the U.S. House of Representatives from Iowa's 5th congressional district 1883–1885	Succeeded by Benjamin T. Frederick
Political offices
Preceded by Aylett R. Cotton	Speaker of the Iowa House of Representatives; 1872–1873	Succeeded by John H. Gear
Preceded by Julius Morton	United States Secretary of Agriculture; 1897–1913	Succeeded by David Houston
