= Seaman A. Knapp =

American university administrator (1833–1911)

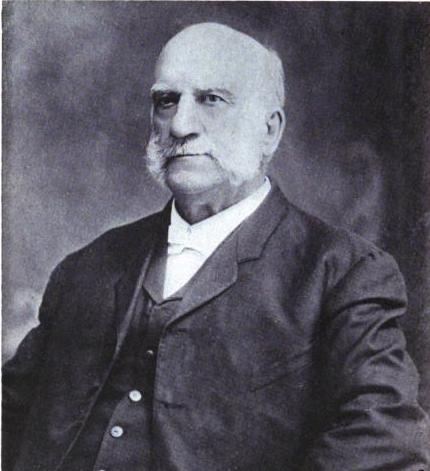
- Seaman A. Knapp
- Born: Seaman Asahel Knapp; December 16, 1833; Essex County, New York, United States
- Died: April 1, 1911 (aged 77); Washington D.C., United States
- Children: George Hotchkiss Knapp; Maria Minnie Knapp; Dr. Herman A. Knapp; Bradford Knapp; Seaman Knapp II; Helen Louise Knapp
- Scientific career
- Fields: Agronomy

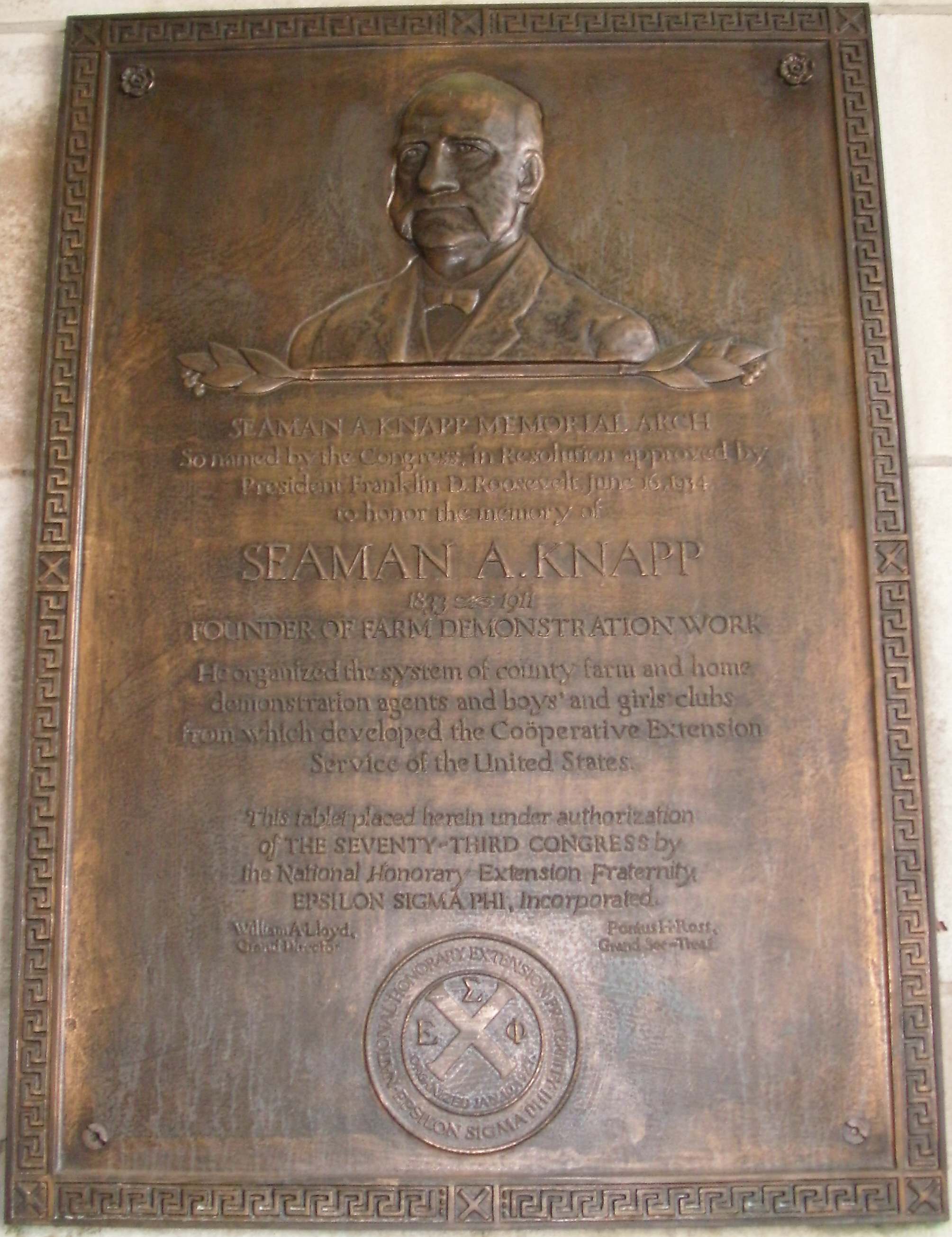
Memorial plaque dedicated to Knapp at the Agriculture Department building, where a pedestrian bridge was named after him

Seaman Asahel Knapp (December 16, 1833 – April 1, 1911) was an American physician, college instructor, and administrator.

== Early life ==
Born in New York, Knapp attended Union College and was a member of Phi Beta Kappa, later moving to Iowa.

== Career ==
Knapp became involved in an organization called 'The Teachers of Agriculture,' attending their meetings at the Michigan Agricultural College in 1881 and Iowa State University in 1882. He drafted a bill for the establishment of experimental research stations, which was later introduced to the 47th Congress, laying the foundation for a nationwide network of agricultural experiment stations.

Knapp later served as the second president of Iowa Agricultural College—the future Iowa State University—from 1883 to 1884; his interest in agricultural demonstration work began in 1886 when he moved to Louisiana and began developing a large tract of agricultural land in the western part of the state. He founded Vinton, Louisiana, naming the town after his hometown, Vinton, Iowa.

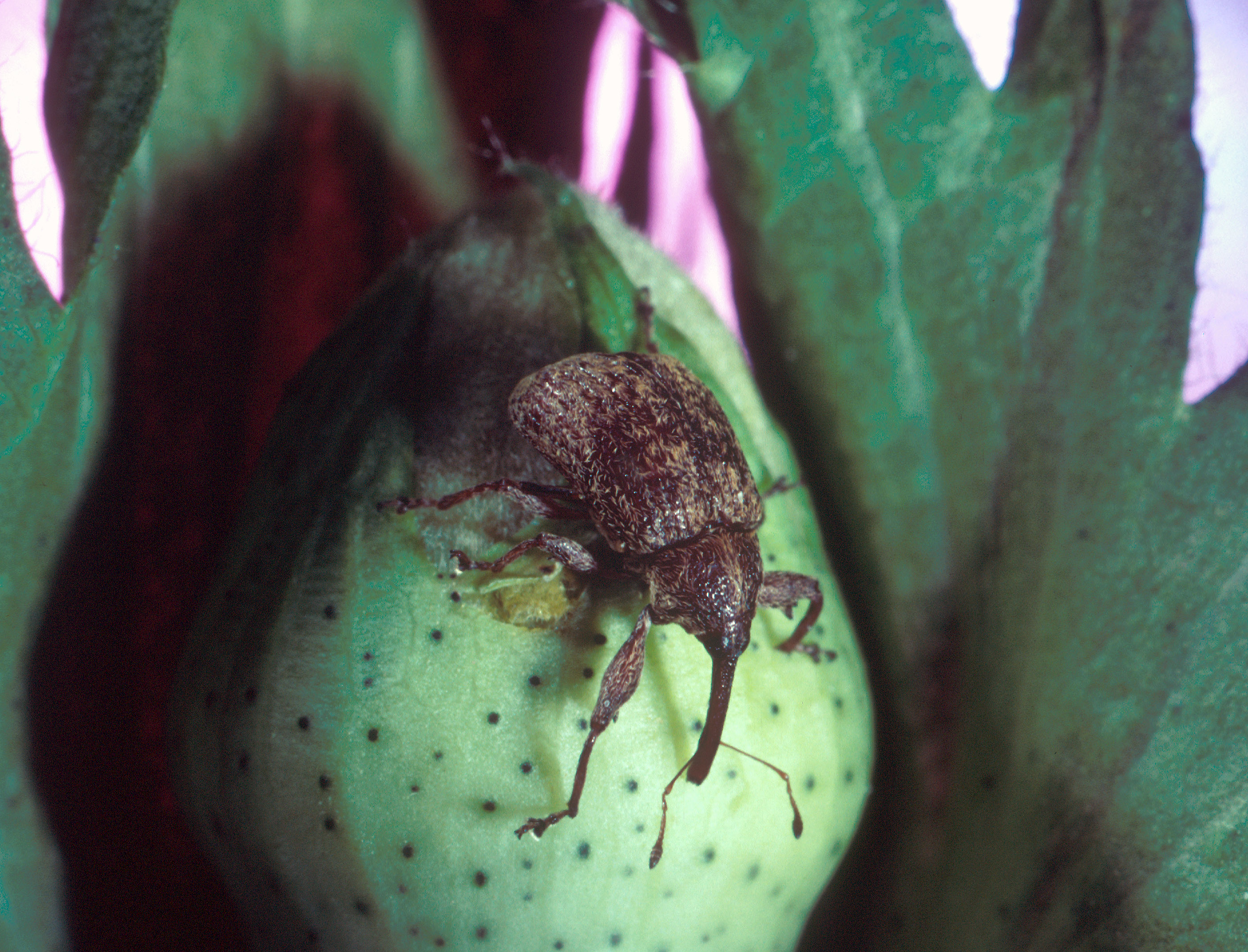
The boll weevil caused trouble for southern farmers after it entered the United States in 1892, creating an interest in farm demonstrations as a way to show farmers how to deal with the pest most effectively. This provided the foundations for formal Cooperative Extension work, which followed in 1914.

Knapp could neither persuade local farmers to adopt the techniques he had perfected on his farm, nor could he enlist farmers from the North to move to the region to help teach them. Thus, he decided to provide incentives for farmers to settle in each township on the condition that each would demonstrate the results of his farming methods to other farmers. Northern farmers began moving into the region, and native farmers began using Knapp's methods. By 1902, Knapp was employed by the government to promote good agricultural practices in the South.

In 1903, the U.S. Department of Agriculture hired Knapp to lead a response to an emergency caused by the boll weevil, which feeds on cotton and contributed to widespread crop losses. He planned to select a representative from each affected community to implement a recommended method for boll weevil control and demonstrate the results.

A farm demonstration at the Walter G. Porter farm, now a National Historic Landmark in Terrell, Texas, was set up by the Department of Agriculture at the urging of concerned merchants and growers. This demonstration of Knapp's techniques was the first in a series of steps that eventually led to the passage of the legislation that formalized Cooperative Extension work.

Convinced with the success of this demonstration, the USDA officials appropriated $250,000 to combat the weevil, which included hiring farmers to demonstrate Knapp’s techniques. By 1904, some 20 agents were employed in Texas, Louisiana, and Arkansas. The movement also spread to neighboring Mississippi and Alabama.

Knapp is commemorated in Washington, D.C., by a bridge linking the U.S. Department of Agriculture Administration Building to the U.S. Department of Agriculture South Building across Independence Avenue.

== Death and legacy ==
Seaman A. Knapp died in 1911, aged 77, and is interred at Iowa State University Cemetery, Ames, Iowa.

November 27, 1912 was named "Knapp Agricultural Day" in all public schools in memory of Knapp. His work continued to be recognized with special honors long after his death.

His son, Bradford Knapp, was the president of the Alabama Polytechnic Institute, now known as Auburn University, from 1928 to 1933, and the second president of Texas Tech University in Lubbock, Texas.

== See also ==
- Kenyon L. Butterfield

Academic offices
Preceded by Adonijah Welch	President of Iowa State University (1883–84)	Succeeded by Leigh S. J. Hunt
