= Genie Clark Pomeroy =

American poet

Eugenia Clark Pomeroy
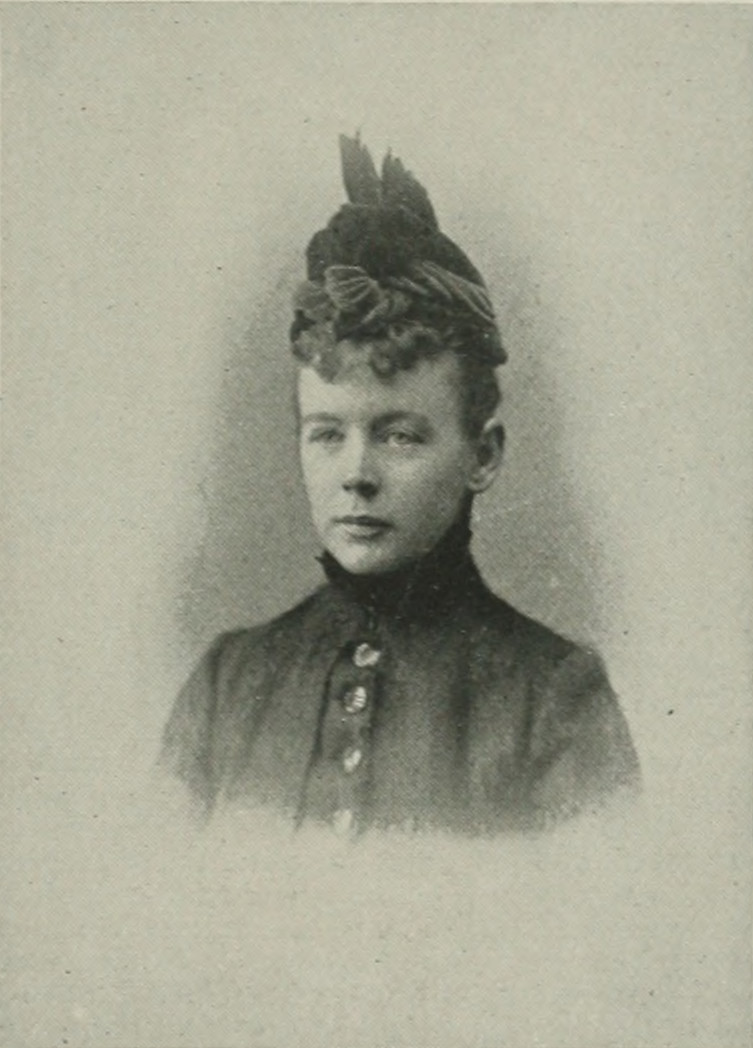
- Born: Eugenia Orr Clark; April 27, 1867; Iowa City, Iowa
- Died: September 21, 1904 (aged 37); New York City, New York
- Education: Des Moines University
- Occupations: Writer, journalist
- Known for: A woman of the century
- Spouse: Carl Harrington Pomeroy
- Father: Rep. Rush B. Clark (1834-1879)

Eugenia Orr Clark Pomeroy (April 27, 1867 – September 21, 1904), later Emerson, was an American writer and journalist.

== Early life ==
Eugenia "Genie" Clark was born in Iowa City, Iowa, on April 27, 1867. Her father, Rush B. Clark (1834–1879 had been an Iowa pioneer as a young man. Both parents were college graduates. Her mother, Eugenia Orr (died April 27, 1867), was a teacher who died giving birth to Genie. A previous son, Eugene Rush Clark, had died during birth in 1865. Clark's father married again in a few years, and to this union, several more children were born, of which two lived.

When Genie Clark was eleven years old, she went to Washington, D.C., to be with her father during his second term as a representative in the U.S. Congress. After his death on the floor of Congress in 1879, she returned to her former home and lived with her guardian at his country seat near Iowa City. Two years were spent afterward in Schellsburg, Pennsylvania, with relatives.

At the age of fourteen she was sent to public schools in Iowa City for the University, from which, after the freshman year, she was sent to Callanan College in Des Moines, Iowa, where she studied for two years.

In 1890, she was among the founders of the Pacific Coast Women's Press Association. A large number of women journalists met on September 27, 1890, at Parkhurst's home at 1419 Tavlor Street, San Francisco, for the formation of the Pacific Coast Woman's Press Association. Henry X. Clemont presided as temporary Chairman. Swett delivered an address, in which she set forth the objects of the association. Nellie B. Evster of San Francisco was unanimously elected president; Jeanne C. Carr of Pasadena, First Vice-President; Ella Rhoads Higginson of the Portland West, Shore, Second Vice-President, and Sarah B. Cooper, Third Vice-President. Swett was elected Corresponding Secretary; Mrs. Sam Davis, Recording Secretary; Mary O. Stanton, Treasurer, and Mrs. M. U. Field of San Jose, Auditor. The Executive Board was still further fortified by three members at large, Mrs. Hall-Wood of the Santa Barbara Independent; Andrea Hofer of the Salem Journal, and Frances Bagby of the San Diego Union.

== Career ==
In 1888 Genie and new husband Carl moved to Seattle, Washington, and afterward to Hoquiam, Washington. While living in Seattle, Genie Pomeroy for the first time made literature a matter of business as well as pleasure, contributing to, among other publications Washington Magazine, Woman's Journal (Boston), Pacific Christian Advocate, Time, West Shore, and other publications.

== Personal life ==
While attending Des Moines University, Genie Clark met Carl Harrington Pomeroy (1862 – September 27, 1923), the son of the president of the college. They married on June 30, 1886, and had one daughter, Delia Imogene Pomeroy. They later divorced. After their marriage, Carl Pomeroy took the chair of history in the college, and Genie Clark Pomeroy remained as a pupil. Both afterward returned to Iowa City and entered school, the one in the post-graduate law department, and the other in the collegiate.

She married Charles Bill Emerson in 1901. She died from an ectopic pregnancy in 1904 in New York City.
