= Spright Dowell =

American academic (1878-1963)

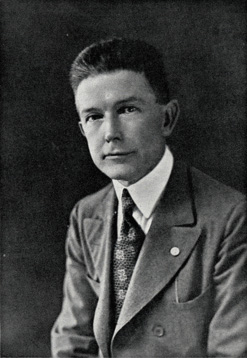
- Dowell pictured in The Glomerata 1921, Auburn yearbook

President of Auburn University
- In office 1920–1927
- Preceded by: Charles Coleman Thach
- Succeeded by: Bradford Knapp

Personal details
- Born: January 2, 1878; Cary, North Carolina
- Died: February 24, 1963 (aged 85); Macon, Georgia

Spright Dowell (January 2, 1878 – February 24, 1963) was the President of Alabama Polytechnic Institute, now known as Auburn University, from 1920 to 1927, and of Mercer University from 1928 to 1953.

== Biography ==
Spright Dowell was born in Cary, North Carolina on January 2, 1878. In 1896, he graduated from Wake Forest College. He attended the Southern University of Tennessee, and received an M.A. from Columbia University in 1911. He taught and worked as a school principal in Alabama and North Carolina. From 1913 to 1919, he worked for the Alabama Department of Education, as chief clerk, director of teacher training, and superintendent of education.

From 1920 to 1927, he was the President of Alabama Polytechnic Institute, now known as Auburn University. From 1928 to 1953, he was President of Mercer University. In 1949 and 1950, he was President of the Georgia Baptist Convention. He also served as secretary-treasurer of the Southern Baptist Education Commission, and became its Chairman in 1953.

== Bibliography ==
- Columbus Roberts, Christian Steward Extraordinary
- A History of Mercer University, 1833-1953

Academic offices
Preceded by Charles Coleman Thach	President of Auburn University; 1920–1927	Succeeded by Bradford Knapp
