= List of United States senators in the 46th Congress =

This is a complete list of United States senators during the 46th United States Congress listed by seniority from March 4, 1879, to March 3, 1881.

Order of service is based on the commencement of the senator's first term. Behind this is former service as a senator (only giving the senator seniority within their new incoming class), service as vice president, a House member, a cabinet secretary, or a governor of a state. The final factor is the population of the senator's state.

Senators who were sworn in during the middle of the Congress (up until the last senator who was not sworn in early after winning the November 1880 election) are listed at the end of the list with no number.

== Terms of service ==
Class	Terms of service of senators that expired in years
Class 1	Terms of service of senators that expired in 1881 (CA, CT, DE, FL, IN, MA, MD, ME, MI, MN, MO, MS, NE, NJ, NV, NY, OH, PA, RI, TN, TX, VA, VT, WI, and WV.)
Class 2	Terms of service of senators that expired in 1883 (AL, AR, CO, DE, GA, IA, IL, KS, KY, LA, MA, ME, MI, MN, MS, NC, NE, NH, NJ, OR, RI, SC, TN, TX, VA, and WV.)
Class 3	Terms of service of senators that expired in 1885 (AL, AR, CA, CO, CT, FL, GA, IA, IL, IN, KS, KY, LA, MD, MO, NC, NH, NV, NY, OH, OR, PA, SC, VT, and WI.)

== U.S. Senate seniority list ==
U.S. Senate seniority
Rank	Senator (party-state)	Seniority date	Other factors
1	Henry B. Anthony (R-RI)	March 4, 1859	Former governor
2	George F. Edmunds (R-VT)	April 3, 1866	
3	Roscoe Conkling (R-NY)	March 4, 1867	
4	Justin Smith Morrill (R-VT)	March 4, 1867	
5	Thomas F. Bayard (D-DE)	March 4, 1869	
6	Hannibal Hamlin (R-ME)	March 4, 1869	
7	Allen G. Thurman (D-OH)	March 4, 1869	
8	Eli Saulsbury (D-DE)	March 4, 1871	
9	Thomas W. Ferry (R-MI)	March 4, 1871	Former representative
10	William Windom (R-MN)	March 4, 1871	Former representative
11	Henry G. Davis (D-WV)	March 4, 1871	
12	John W. Johnston (D-VA)	March 15, 1871	
13	Matt W. Ransom (D-NC)	January 30, 1872	
14	William B. Allison (R-IA)	March 4, 1873	Former representative
15	John J. Ingalls (R-KS)	March 4, 1873	
16	John P. Jones (R-NV)	March 4, 1873	
17	John Brown Gordon (D-GA)	March 4, 1873	
18	William W. Eaton (D-CT)	February 5, 1875	
19	Francis Cockrell (D-MO)	March 4, 1875	
20	Henry L. Dawes (R-MA)	March 4, 1875	
21	Charles W. Jones (D-FL)	March 4, 1875	
22	Samuel J. R. McMillan (R-MN)	March 4, 1875	
23	Samuel B. Maxey (D-TX)	March 4, 1875	
24	Ambrose Burnside (R-RI)	March 4, 1875	Former governor
25	Newton Booth (AM-CA)	March 4, 1875	Former governor
26	Joseph E. McDonald (D-IN)	March 4, 1875	Former representative
27	William Pinkney Whyte (D-MD)	March 4, 1875	
28	Blanche Bruce (R-MS)	March 4, 1875	
29	Algernon Paddock (R-NE)	March 4, 1875	
30	Theodore F. Randolph (D-NJ)	March 4, 1875	Former governor
31	Francis Kernan (D-NY)	March 4, 1875	
32	William A. Wallace (D-PA)	March 4, 1875	
33	Robert E. Withers (D-VA)	March 4, 1875	
34	William Sharon (R-NV)	March 4, 1875	
35	James G. Blaine (R-ME)	July 10, 1876	Former representative
36	Henry M. Teller (R-CO)	November 15, 1876	
37	James E. Bailey (D-TN)	January 19, 1877	
38	Frank Hereford (D-WV)	January 31, 1877	
39	George F. Hoar (R-MA)	March 4, 1877	Former representative
40	Isham G. Harris (D-TN)	March 4, 1877	Former governor
41	John Tyler Morgan (D-AL)	March 4, 1877	
42	John R. McPherson (D-NJ)	March 4, 1877	
43	Matthew Butler (D-SC)	March 4, 1877	
44	Richard Coke (D-TX)	March 4, 1877	
45	Preston B. Plumb (R-KS)	March 4, 1877	
46	James B. Beck (D-KY)	March 4, 1877	
47	Lucius Q. C. Lamar (D-MS)	March 4, 1877	
48	Augustus H. Garland (D-AR)	March 4, 1877	
49	Benjamin H. Hill (D-GA)	March 4, 1877	
50	David Davis (I-IL)	March 4, 1877	
51	Samuel J. Kirkwood (R-IA)	March 4, 1877	
52	Alvin Saunders (R-NE)	March 4, 1877	
53	Edward H. Rollins (R-NH)	March 4, 1877	
54	William P. Kellogg (R-LA)	March 4, 1877	
55	La Fayette Grover (D-OR)	March 4, 1877	Former governor
56	J. Donald Cameron (R-PA)	March 20, 1877	
57	Daniel W. Voorhees (D-IN)	November 6, 1877	
58	Zachariah Chandler (R-MI)	February 22, 1879	
59	George G. Vest (D-MO)	March 4, 1879	Missouri 5th in population (1870)
60	Orville H. Platt (R-CT)	March 4, 1879	Connecticut 25th in population (1870)
61	Wilkinson Call (D-FL)	March 4, 1879	Florida 33rd in population (1870)
62	Zebulon Baird Vance (D-NC)	March 4, 1879	
63	Wade Hampton III (R-SC)	March 4, 1879	
64	John A. Logan (R-IL)	March 4, 1879	
65	James D. Walker (D-AR)	March 4, 1879	
66	James T. Farley (D-CA)	March 4, 1879	
67	Nathaniel P. Hill (R-CO)	March 4, 1879	
68	John S. Williams (D-KY)	March 4, 1879	
69	Benjamin F. Jonas (D-LA)	March 4, 1879	
70	George H. Pendleton (D-OH)	March 4, 1879	Former representative
71	James H. Slater (D-OR)	March 4, 1879	Former representative
72	James B. Groome (D-MD)	March 4, 1879	Former governor
73	George S. Houston (D-AL)	March 4, 1879	Former representative
74	Matthew H. Carpenter (R-WI)	March 4, 1879	
	Charles H. Bell (R-NH)	March 13, 1879	
	Henry W. Blair (R-NH)	June 18, 1879	Former representative
	Henry P. Baldwin (R-MI)	November 17, 1879	Former governor
	Luke Pryor (D-AL)	January 7, 1880	
	Joseph E. Brown (D-GA)	May 26, 1880	
	James L. Pugh (D-AL)	November 24, 1880	

== See also ==
- 46th United States Congress
- List of United States representatives in the 46th Congress
