= Central Heating Plant =

Building in Washington, D.C.

- U.S. National Register of Historic Places
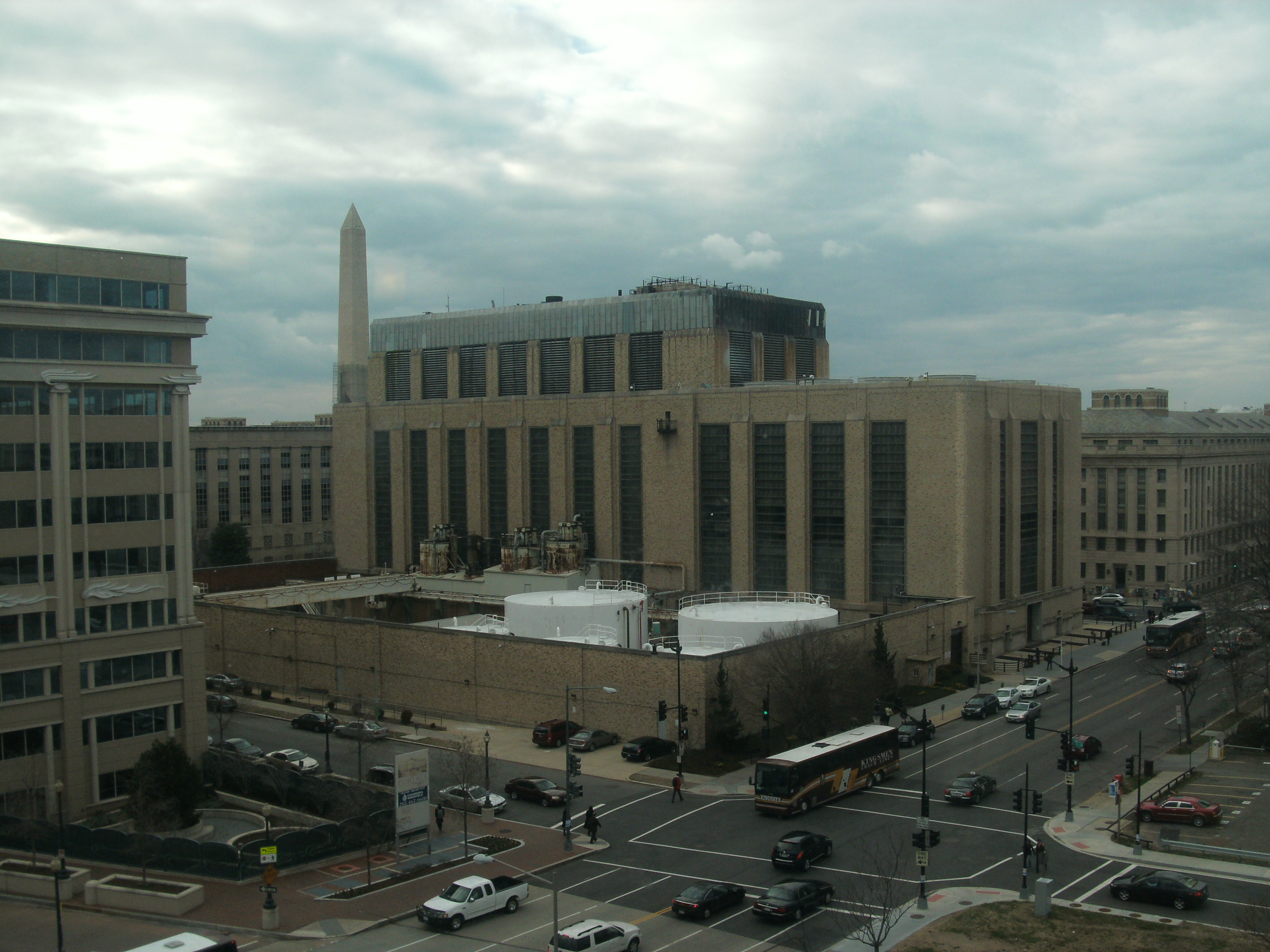

- Location within Central Washington, D.C. Location within the District of Columbia Location within the United States
- Location: 325 13th Street, SW Washington, D.C.
- Coordinates: 38°53′08.07″N 77°01′44.1″W
- Built: 1933
- Architect: Paul Philippe Cret
- Architectural style: Art Deco, Industrial
- NRHP reference No.: 07000637
- Added to NRHP: July 06, 2007

The Central Heating Plant is a power station located at 325 13th Street, SW in the Southwest Federal Center neighborhood of Washington, D.C. which serves most of the United States federal government buildings near the National Mall.

== Background ==
Operated by the General Services Administration, it was designed by architect Paul Philippe Cret in 1933. At the time of its construction it was the largest such heating facility in the United States and served 22 federal buildings. It was placed on the National Register of Historic Places in 2007.

Cret used Art Deco styling for the essentially industrial building, a departure from the prevailing Washington classicism, but was able to integrate it with its surroundings through careful massing and detailing. Pilasters and vertical ribbons of windows stand in for classical colonnades. Cret designed the roof profile so that the plant's smokestacks did not project above the equipment screen, satisfying the concerns of the District of Columbia Commission on Fine Arts, which had jurisdiction over the design. The three octagonal smokestacks rise only 42 feet (13 m). Limestone relief panels illustrate the building's purpose with depictions of a boiler, safety valve, generator, fan and heat exchanger. The building is noteworthy as an early example of Modernism-influenced architecture, and as a notably attractive building in its own right.

Originally designed to burn coal, the Central Heating Plant has been converted to use oil and natural gas. A central refrigeration plant constructed in 1957 obscures the east elevation.

== See also ==
- National Register of Historic Places listings in Southwest Quadrant, Washington, D.C.
- Capitol Power Plant
