= William George Thompson =

American politician

William G. Thompson
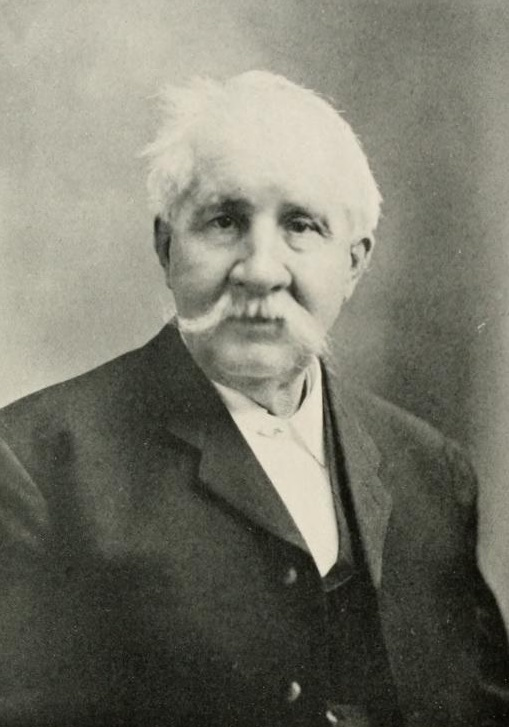

Member of the Iowa House of Representatives
- In office 1885–1887

Member of the U.S. House of Representatives from Iowa's 5th district
- In office December 1, 1879 – March 3, 1883
- Preceded by: Rush Clark
- Succeeded by: James Wilson

Chief Justice of the Idaho Territorial Supreme Court
- In office January 23, 1879 – April 1879
- Appointed by: Rutherford B. Hayes
- Preceded by: M. E. Hollister
- Succeeded by: John T. Morgan

Personal details
- Born: January 17, 1830 Butler, Pennsylvania, U.S.
- Died: April 2, 1911 (aged 81) Kenwood Park, Iowa, U.S
- Party: Republican
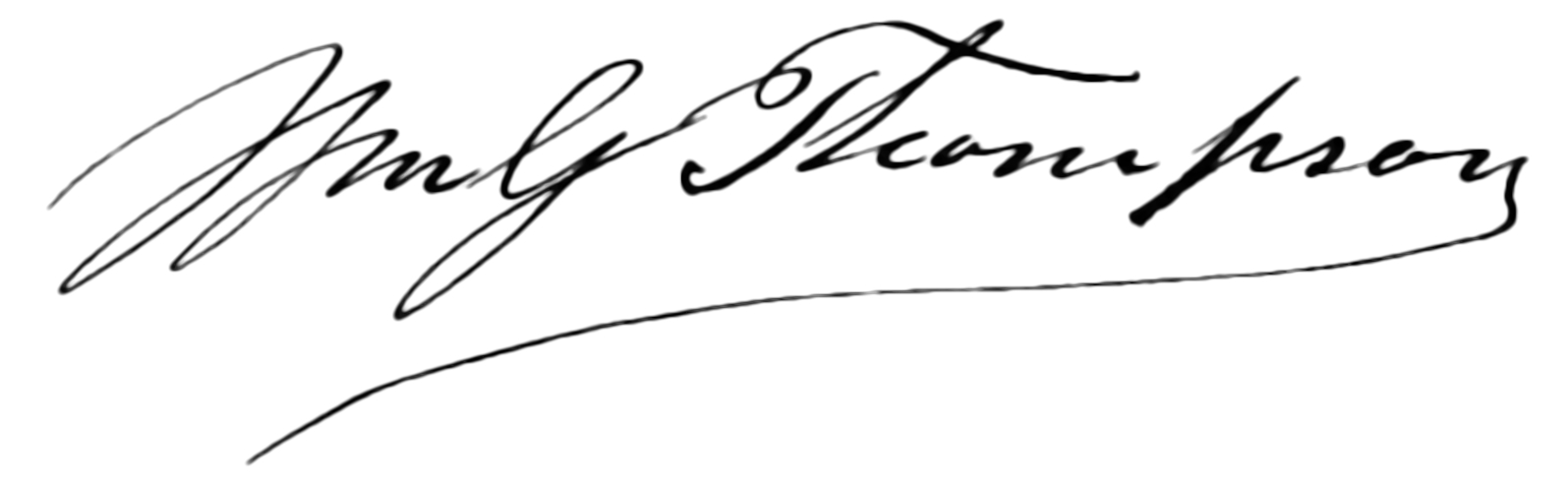
- Signature

Military service
- Branch/service: Union Army
- Rank: Major
- Unit: 20th Iowa Infantry Regiment
- Battles/wars: Civil War

William George Thompson (January 17, 1830 – April 2, 1911) was an American Civil War officer, trial-court judge, territorial justice, and Republican Representative in the United States House of Iowa's 5th congressional district.

== Biography ==
Thompson was born and raised in Butler, Pennsylvania, the younger brother of future Pennsylvania Congressman John McCandless Thompson. In 1853, he was admitted to the bar and moved to Marion, Iowa. He became the prosecuting attorney for Linn County, Iowa in 1854, then left in 1856 to serve in the Iowa Senate, serving until 1860. When the Civil War broke out he became a major in the 20th Iowa Volunteer Infantry Regiment.

After the War, he served as district attorney for Iowa's eighth judicial district for six years. He then was nominated by President Rutherford B. Hayes as Chief Justice of the Idaho Territorial Supreme Court on January 20, 1879, and was confirmed by the United States Senate three days later.

In April 1879, Thompson resigned as chief justice to run as a Republican to represent Iowa's fifth district in the Forty-sixth Congress, to fill the vacancy caused by the death of Rush Clark. Thompson won the special election, and served in most of the Forty-sixth Congress. In 1882, he was re-elected, serving in the Forty-seventh Congress, but chose not to run in 1884 for the Forty-eighth.

On his return to Iowa, Thompson served on the Marion City Council and ran for the Iowa General Assembly. He served in the Iowa House of Representatives from 1885 to 1887. Returning to the bench, he was elected as judge of Iowa's eighteenth judicial district, serving from 1894 to 1906. He retired to Kenwood Park, Iowa where he died April 2, 1911. He is interred at Oak Shade Cemetery in Marion.

U.S. House of Representatives
Preceded by Rush Clark	Member of the U.S. House of Representatives from Iowa's 5th congressional district December 1, 1879–March 3, 1883	Succeeded by James Wilson
