= Rush Clark =

American politician (1834–1879)

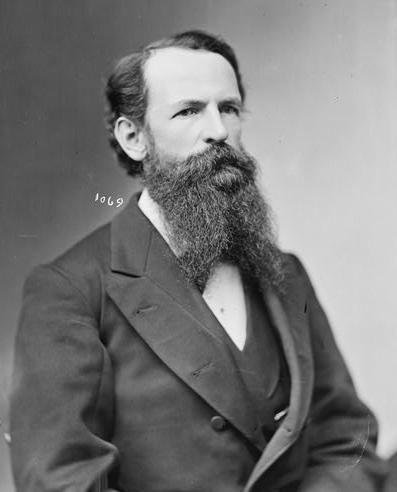

Member of the U.S. House of Representatives from Iowa's 5th district
- In office March 4, 1877 – April 29, 1879
- Preceded by: James Wilson
- Succeeded by: William G. Thompson

Member of the Iowa House of Representatives
- In office 1860-1864

Personal details
- Born: October 1, 1834 Schellsburg, Pennsylvania, US
- Died: April 29, 1879 (aged 44) Washington, D.C., US
- Party: Republican
- Profession: Politician • Lawyer

Rush Clark (October 1, 1834 – April 29, 1879) was a nineteenth-century politician and lawyer from Iowa, who died on the floor of Congress in 1879.

== Biography ==
Born in Schellsburg, Pennsylvania, Clark attended common schools and a local academy in Ligonier, Pennsylvania as a child. He graduated from Jefferson College in 1853, studied law and was admitted to the bar the same year, commencing practice in Iowa City, Iowa.

He was a member of the Iowa House of Representatives from 1860 to 1864, serving as Speaker of the House in 1863 and 1864, served on the staff of Governor Samuel J. Kirkwood in 1861 and 1862 and aided in the organization of volunteer regiments from Iowa during the Civil War. Clark was a trustee of the University of Iowa from 1862 to 1866, was again a member of the Iowa House of Representatives in 1876.

In 1876, he was elected as a Republican to represent Iowa's 5th congressional district in the United States House of Representatives. He was re-elected two years later. However, on April 29, 1879, near the beginning of the first session of his second term, he died suddenly on the floor of the House, reportedly suffering an attack of meningitis. He was interred in Oakland Cemetery in Iowa City.

== Personal life ==
He married Eugenia Orr (died April 27, 1867), who was a teacher who died giving birth to daughter Eugenia Clark Pomeroy. A previous son, Eugene Rush Clark, had died during birth in 1865. Clark married again in a few years, and to this union, several more children were born, of which two lived.

== See also ==
- List of members of the United States Congress who died in office (1790–1899)

U.S. House of Representatives
Preceded by James Wilson	Member of the U.S. House of Representatives from Iowa's 5th congressional district March 4, 1877 – April 29, 1879	Succeeded by William G. Thompson
