= United States Department of Agriculture South Building =

Office building in Washington, D.C.

- U.S. Department of Agriculture South Building
- U.S. National Register of Historic Places
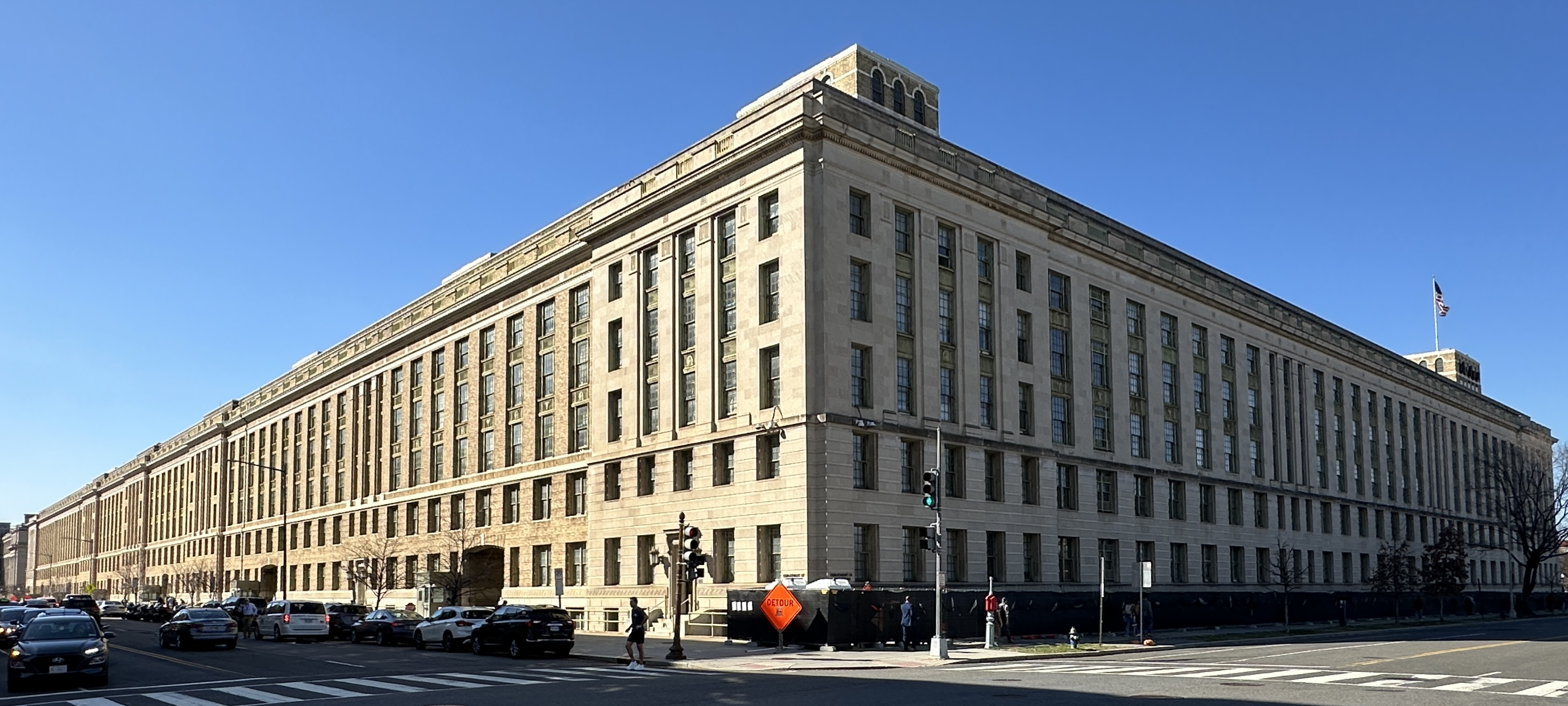
- U.S. Department of Agriculture South Building in 2026

- Location within Central Washington, D.C. Location within the District of Columbia Location within the United States
- Location: 14th Street and Independence Avenue, SW; Washington, D.C.
- Coordinates: 38°53′12″N 77°01′48″W
- Built: 1936
- Architect: Louis A. Simon
- Architectural style: Modern Movement, Stripped Classicism
- NRHP reference No.: 07000643
- Added to NRHP: July 05, 2007

The U.S. Department of Agriculture South Building is an office building located at 14th Street and Independence Avenue, Southwest, Washington, D.C.

== History ==
It was built beginning in 1930, to house the expanded offices of the United States Department of Agriculture (USDA). Construction was completed on the U.S. Department of Agriculture Administration Building to the north of Independence Avenue in 1930, but Depression-era agriculture programs demanded far more office space than the main building could provide. The phased construction was completed in 1936. The building was added to the National Register of Historic Places in 2007.

Completed in 1936, the South Building was the largest office building in the world until the completion of the Pentagon, with dimensions of 458 feet (140 m) by 944 feet (288 m) in seven stories with 4500 rooms. The building's design is credited to Louis A. Simon of the Federal Office of the Supervising Architect. The South Building was joined to the Administration Building by two enclosed pedestrian bridges spanning Independence Avenue, thus consolidating USDA operations into one complex. The single-span stone arches form a dramatic accent on Independence Avenue. The soffits of the bridges are faced with Guastavino tile. The east bridge is dedicated to Seaman A. Knapp, while the west bridge commemorates Agriculture Secretary James Wilson. The new building contained laboratory space as well as offices. It was originally referred to as the "Extensible Building", which could be expanded in a phased fashion. Phasing was necessary due to the time required to acquire such a large parcel of land.

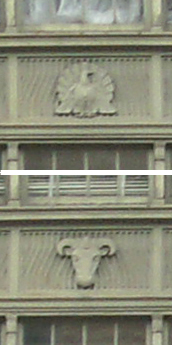
Edwin Morris relief panels on the windows at the rear of the building, facing C Street

The architecture of the South Building is a stripped-down example of Classicism, with plain detailing that borrows from Classical form and proportion without using a great deal of expensive and time-consuming detail. The style became popular for government buildings until the advent of the Modern style in government architecture, reaching its apex at the Pentagon. In the case of the South Building, the lesser level of detail indicated its subordinate position vis-à-vis the Administration Building. The interior is based on a rigidly-enforced network of corridors; only the departmental auditorium and library deviate from the corridor grid. Interiors are even more plain than the exterior.

The building is arranged in seven north–south wings, connected at the ends by the Headhouse (facing Independence Avenue) and Tailhouse (facing C Street). The 12th and 14th Street elevations were planned to be seen from the National Mall and so were sheathed in limestone. The C Street and Independence Avenue elevations, which are not visible from the National Mall, used brick as the primary material, with limestone and terra cotta detailing. The 14th Street elevation also features a monumental entrance with sixteen Corinthian columns. Elsewhere, relief panels between windows feature depictions of animals native to the United States by sculptor Edwin Morris.

Since the relocation of laboratory space to the Beltsville Agricultural Research Center, the South Building has been occupied exclusively by offices. In February 2026, the USDA announced plans to relocate elsewhere and sell the building.

== See also ==
- National Register of Historic Places listings in the District of Columbia
- Southwest Federal Center, Washington, D.C.
- U.S. Department of Agriculture Cotton Annex
