= Jamie L. Whitten Building =

Headquarters of the U.S. Department of Agriculture

- U.S. Department of Agriculture Administration Building
- U.S. National Register of Historic Places
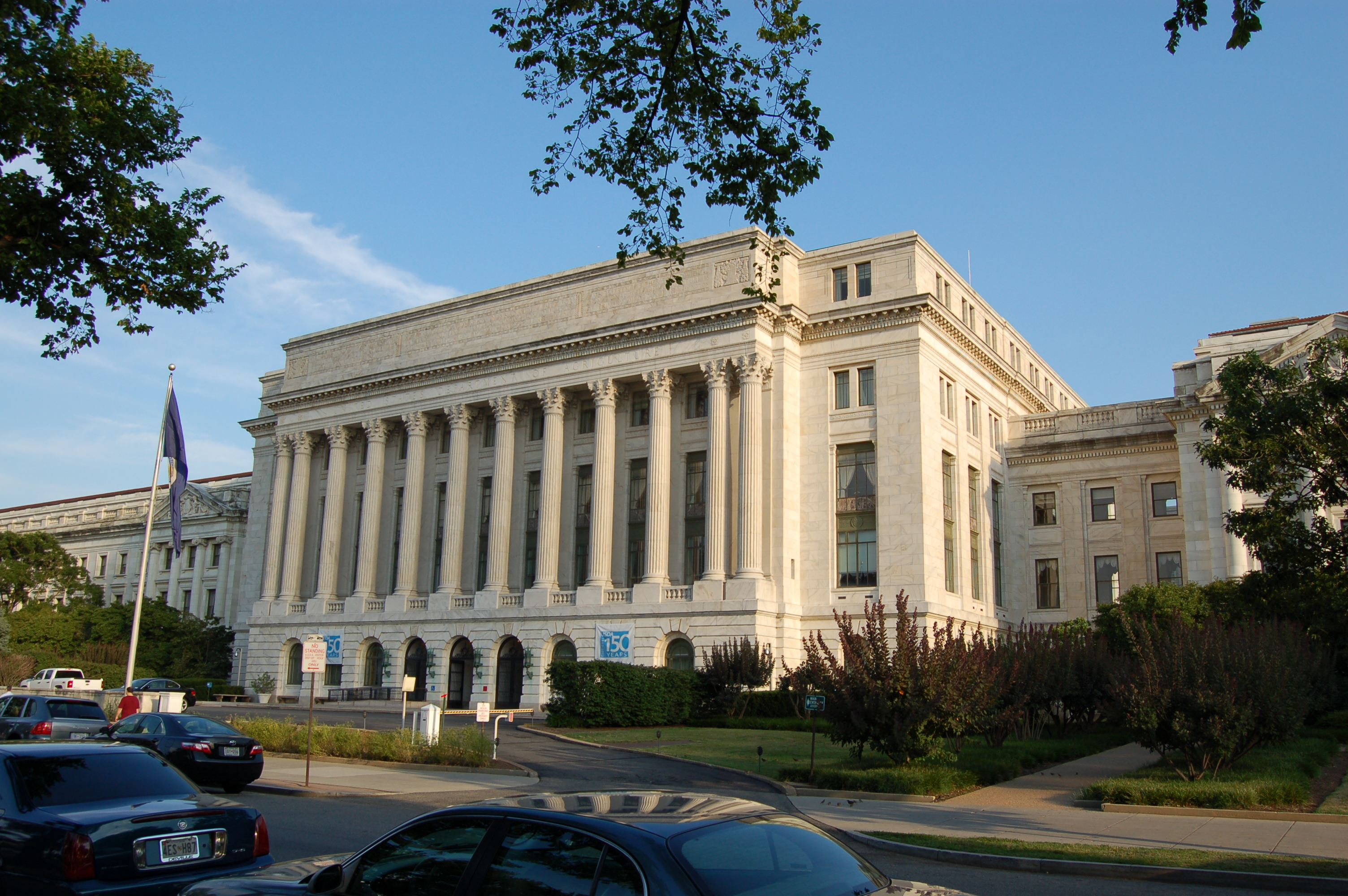
- Jamie L. Whitten Building in 2012

- Location within Central Washington, D.C.
- Location: 12th St. and Jefferson Dr., SW., Washington, D.C.
- Coordinates: 38°53′17″N 77°1′48″W
- Built: 1908; 118 years ago
- Architect: Rankin, Kellogg & Crane
- Architectural style: Classical Revival, Beaux-Arts
- Website: Official website
- NRHP reference No.: 74002175 (original); 15000845 (increase)

Significant dates
- Added to NRHP: January 24, 1974
- Boundary increase: December 1, 2015

The U.S. Department of Agriculture Administration Building, also known as the Jamie L. Whitten Building, houses the administrative offices of the U.S. Department of Agriculture in Washington, D.C. The Administration Building projects into the National Mall from the larger U.S. Department of Agriculture South Building, and is the only building on the Mall that is not intended for use by the general public. It was the first large Beaux-Arts style building in Washington and set the prototype for the later buildings of the Federal Triangle. The east and west wings were the first Federal office buildings to be built of reinforced concrete. The Whitten Building was listed on the National Register of Historic Places in 1974.

== History ==
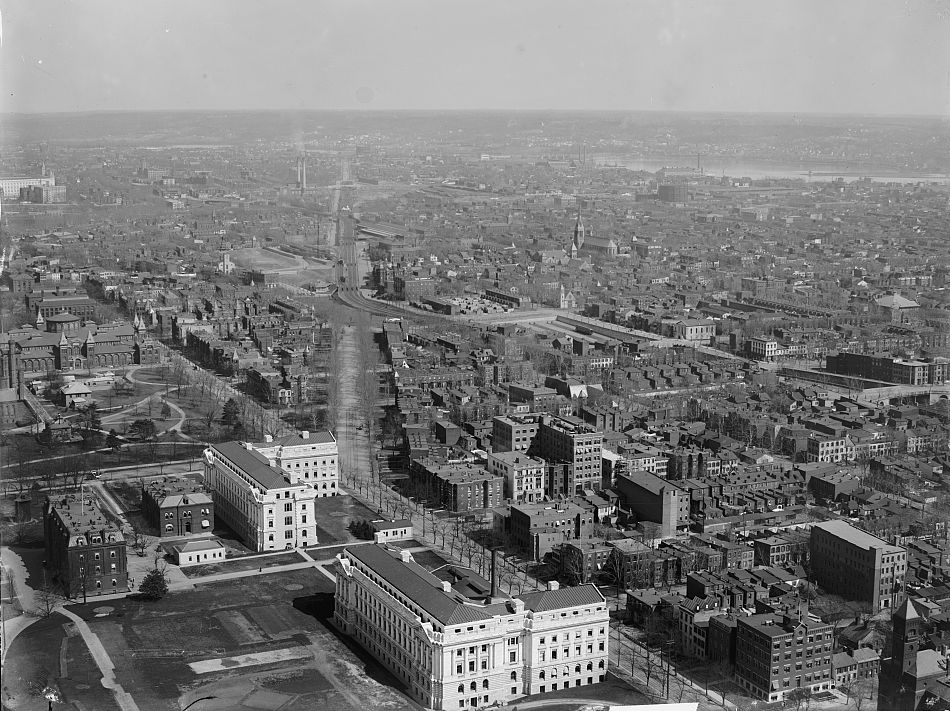
The new Department of Agriculture building around 1910. The two wings were constructed before the central portion. The old headquarters building is to their right.

The placement of the new building on the Mall was at odds with the proposed McMillan Plan, which envisioned a Mall free of intrusive buildings. The Agriculture Department's proposed placement was opposed by Commission members Daniel Burnham and Charles McKim. After a series of intercessions by President Theodore Roosevelt the building was moved to be in accordance with the Plan, but only after foundations were in place for a building 106 feet (32 m) to the east of the final location.

As the public face of the Department of Agriculture, the Beaux-Arts style Administration Building was designed by architects Rankin, Kellogg and Crane to a higher standard than the South Building. However, a limited budget enforced a comparative plainness when set against other buildings on the Mall. The L-shaped wings were completed between 1904 and 1908, but the central block was not finished until 1930. The prototype for the design was Ange-Jacques Gabriel's 1774 Hôtel de la Marine on the Place de la Concorde in Paris. The pediment features sculpture by Adolph Alexander Weinman, while interior murals are by Gilbert White. While the earlier east and west wings featured reinforced concrete construction, the central portion was built in steel.

The building was named the Jamie L. Whitten building in 1995 in honor of Mississippi Congressman Jamie L. Whitten, former chairman of the United States House Appropriations Subcommittee on Agriculture, Rural Development, Food and Drug Administration, and Related Agencies.

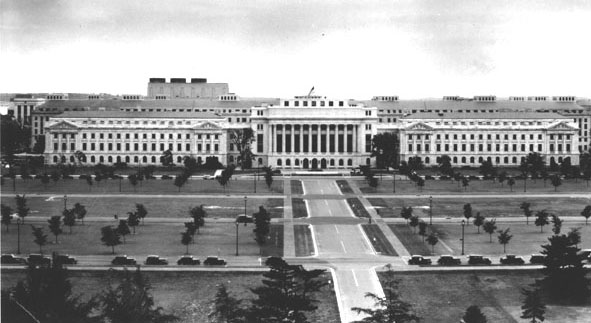
Administration Building, c. 1934

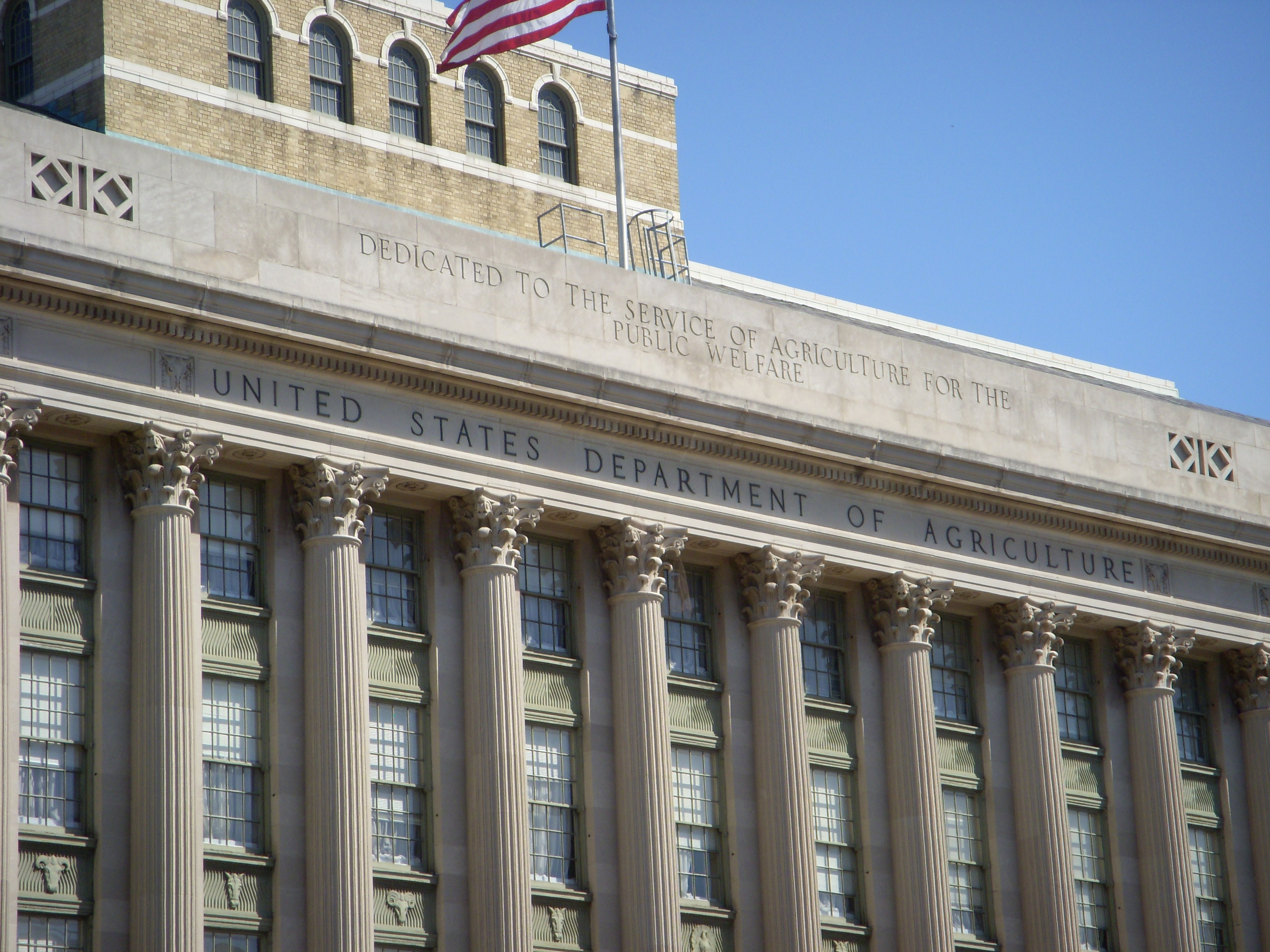
Façade of the building with Corinthian columns

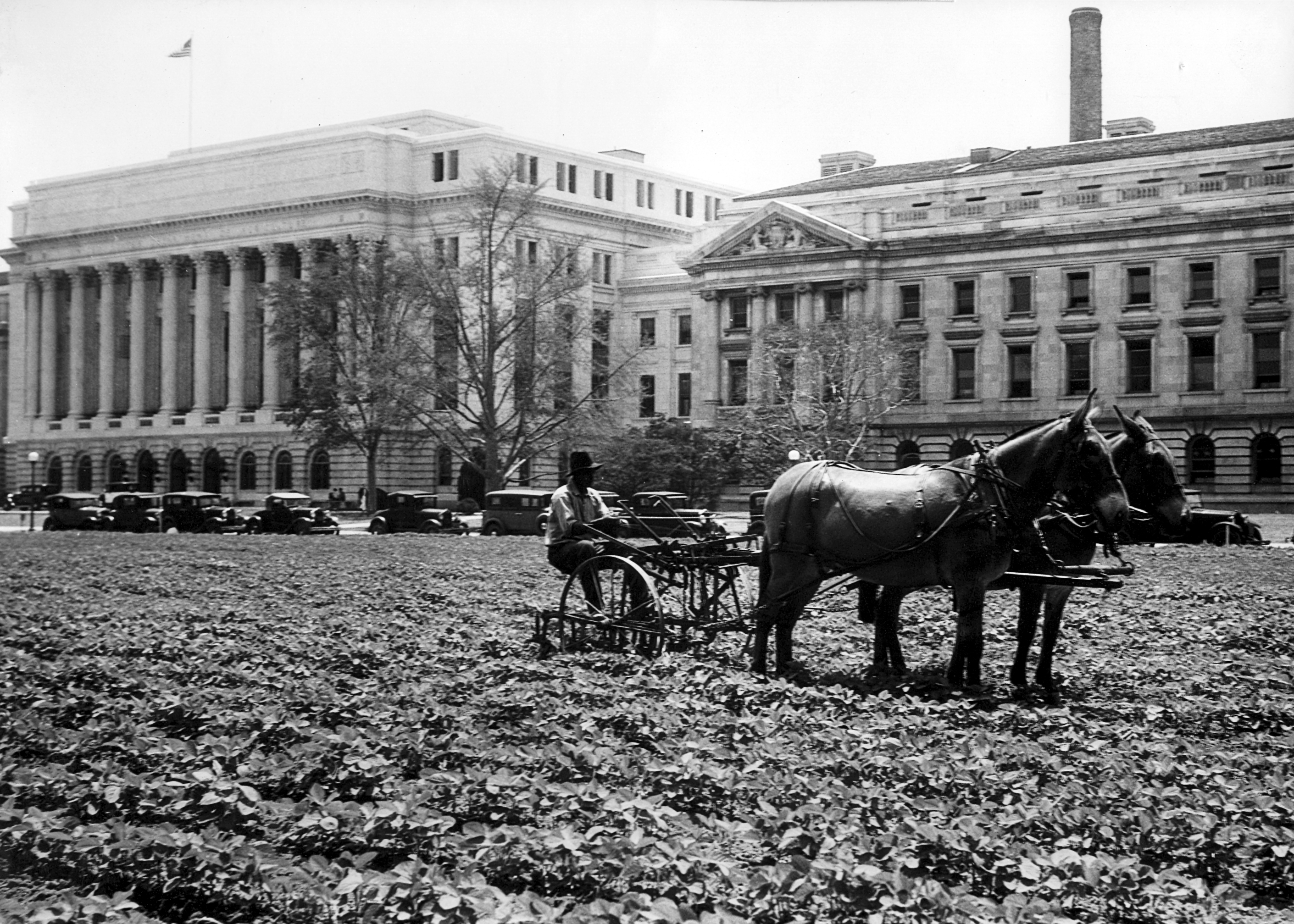
A Department of Agriculture employee uses a mule-drawn tiller to plant a new lawn, 1931

=== Linking bridges ===
In 1936, two enclosed pedestrian bridges were built across Independence Avenue. The single-span stone arches form a dramatic accent on Independence Avenue. The soffits of the bridges are faced with Guastavino tile. The east bridge is dedicated to Seaman A. Knapp, while the west bridge commemorates Agriculture Secretary James Wilson.
