= Curtis and Davis Architects and Engineers =

American architectural firm

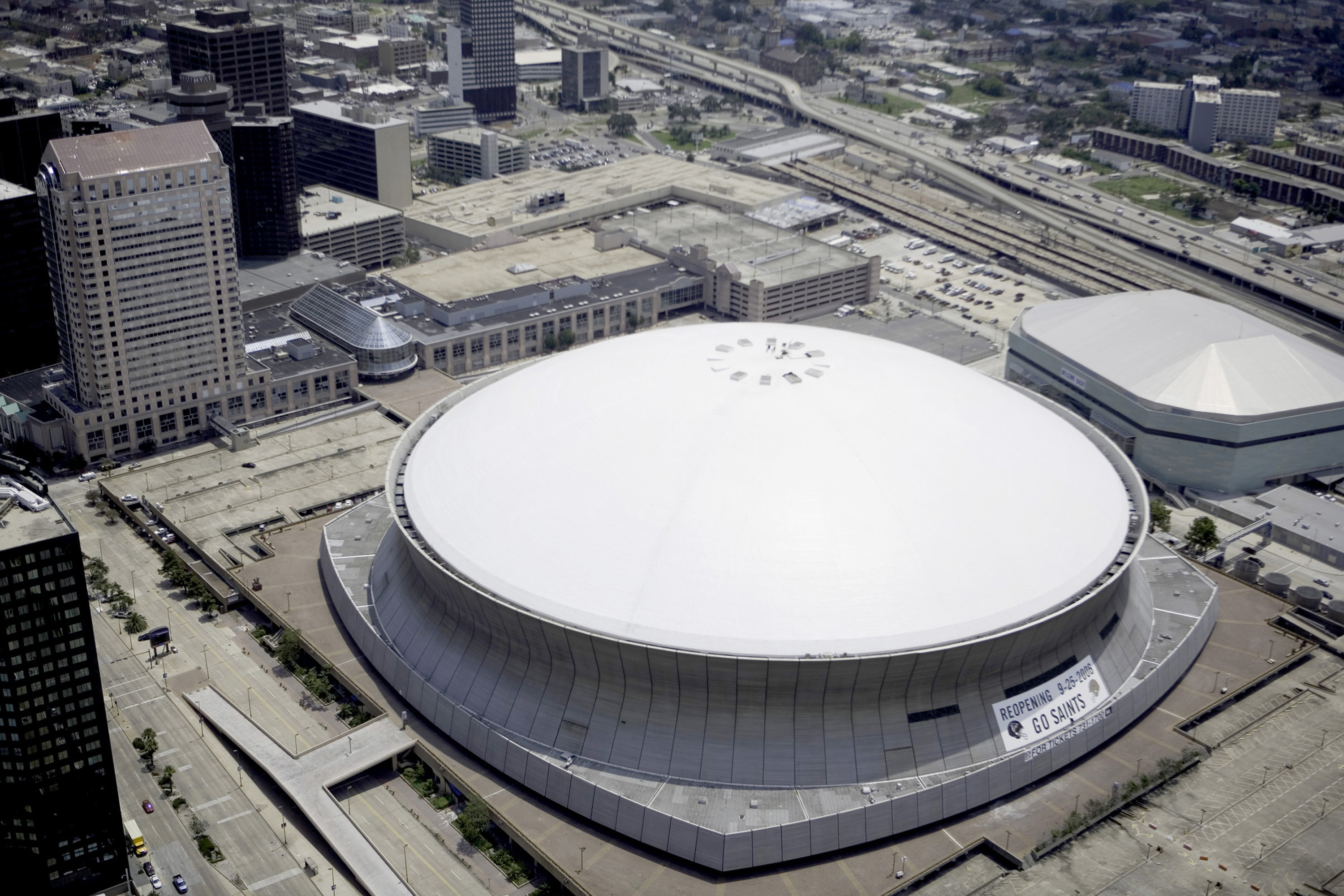
- Louisiana Superdome in 2006

Practice information
- Key architects: Nathaniel Cortlandt Curtis Jr. Arthur Quentin Davis
- Founded: 1947
- Dissolved: 1978
- Location: New Orleans, Louisiana, USA

Significant works and honors
- Buildings: Louisiana Superdome; Embassy of the United States, Saigon; IBM Building
- Awards: Awards of Merit, American Institute of Architects; Outstanding Interior Design, Institutions magazine

Curtis and Davis Architects and Engineers was an American architectural and design firm based in New Orleans, Louisiana. They designed more than 400 buildings in 30 states in the United States and nine countries worldwide. Curtis and Davis was dissolved upon its 1978 sale to the firm of Daniel, Mann, Johnson and Mendenhall. The firm is sometimes referred to as Curtis & Davis.

In 2011, Kenneth Schwartz, then dean of the Tulane University School of Architecture, stated: "It [Curtis and Davis] was the pivotal firm of the city from the 1950s on. Their legacy is really extensive, not only in New Orleans but also across the world."

== Founding ==
Nathaniel Cortlandt Curtis, Jr., and Arthur Quentin Davis formed Curtis and Davis in 1947. They knew each other as classmates at the Tulane University School of Architecture, having graduated one year apart. Curtis approached Davis about forming the firm, at a time when they perceived that the city of New Orleans was ripe for an infusion of modernist architecture. Revivalist designs had dominated New Orleans architecture in the years leading up to the founding of Curtis and Davis. In the immediate post-war period, there was significant demand for new construction in New Orleans. For these reasons, their earliest projects were in New Orleans.

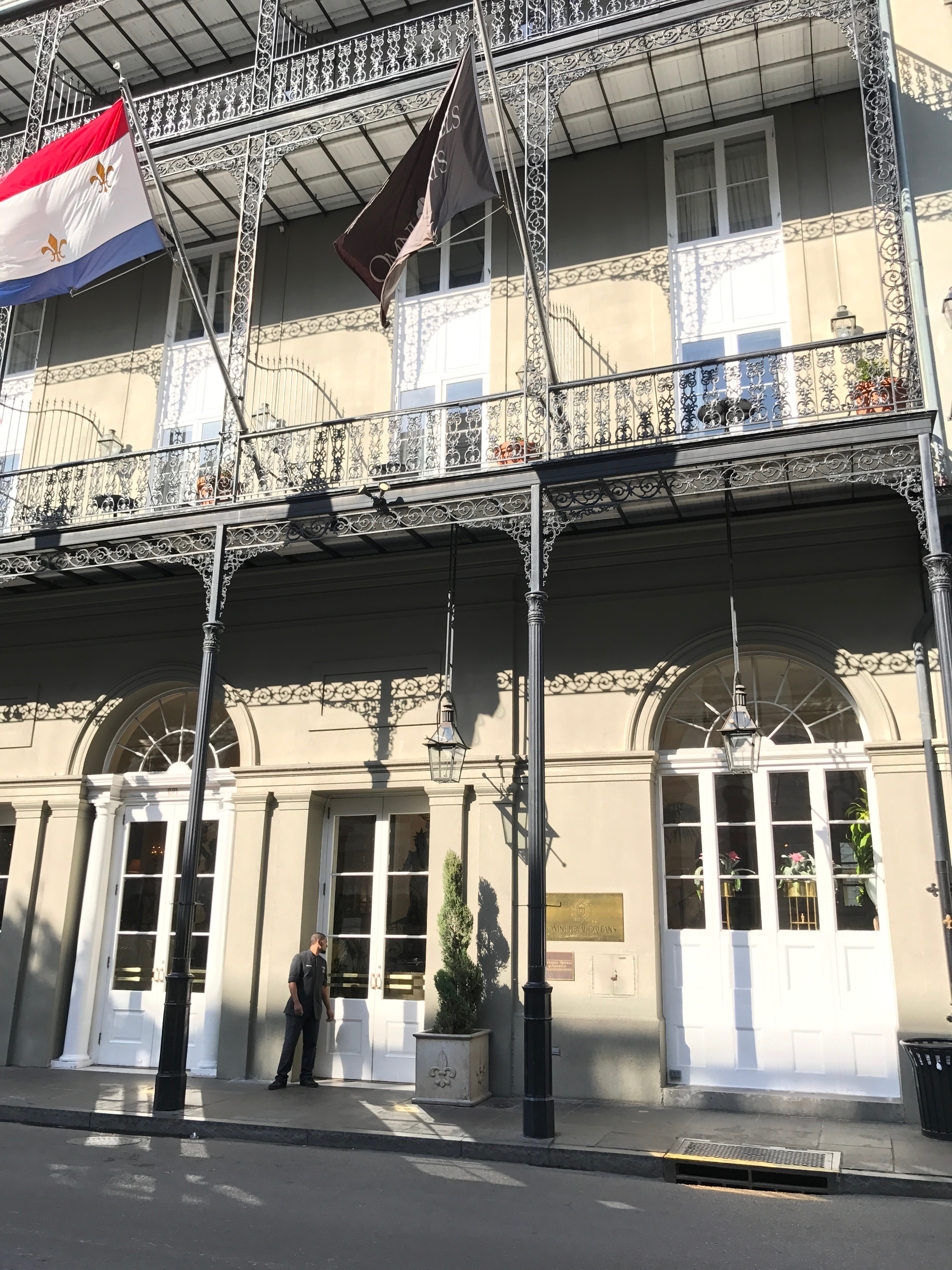
Omni Royal Orleans Hotel, designed by Curtis & Davis in collaboration with S. Wilson, as seen in 2017

In Curtis's autobiographical account of the founding of Curtis and Davis, published posthumously, Curtis stated that the founding of the firm was a "totally casual undertaking". With little thought, Davis accepted Curtis's proposal to create the firm. The two founders then capitalized the firm for USD 500 and rented office space on Union Street in the New Orleans Central Business District.

As the firm grew, Curtis and Davis employed a significant number of associate architects. Some achieved the status of partner. By 1960, the firm had a considerable number of international design projects underway and had opened satellite offices in New York, London, Berlin, and Los Angeles. It employed 40 people at its New Orleans office. Its headquarters at the time was in the Caribe Building, also a Curtis and Davis design, located at 2475 Canal Street in New Orleans. As part of the firm's successful expansion, Curtis and Davis employed a marketing director (then called a "job-getter") and instituted a public relations program.

Typical of architectural practice, Curtis and Davis often collaborated with other architects and designers, especially for large projects. An example was the collaboration between Curtis and Davis and architect Sam Wilson on the design of the Royal Orleans Hotel in the French Quarter of New Orleans.

By 1971, Curtis and Davis housed their headquarters in an historic and renovated sugar warehouse at 111 Iberville Street in the French Quarter of New Orleans.

=== Nathaniel Cortlandt Curtis Jr. ===
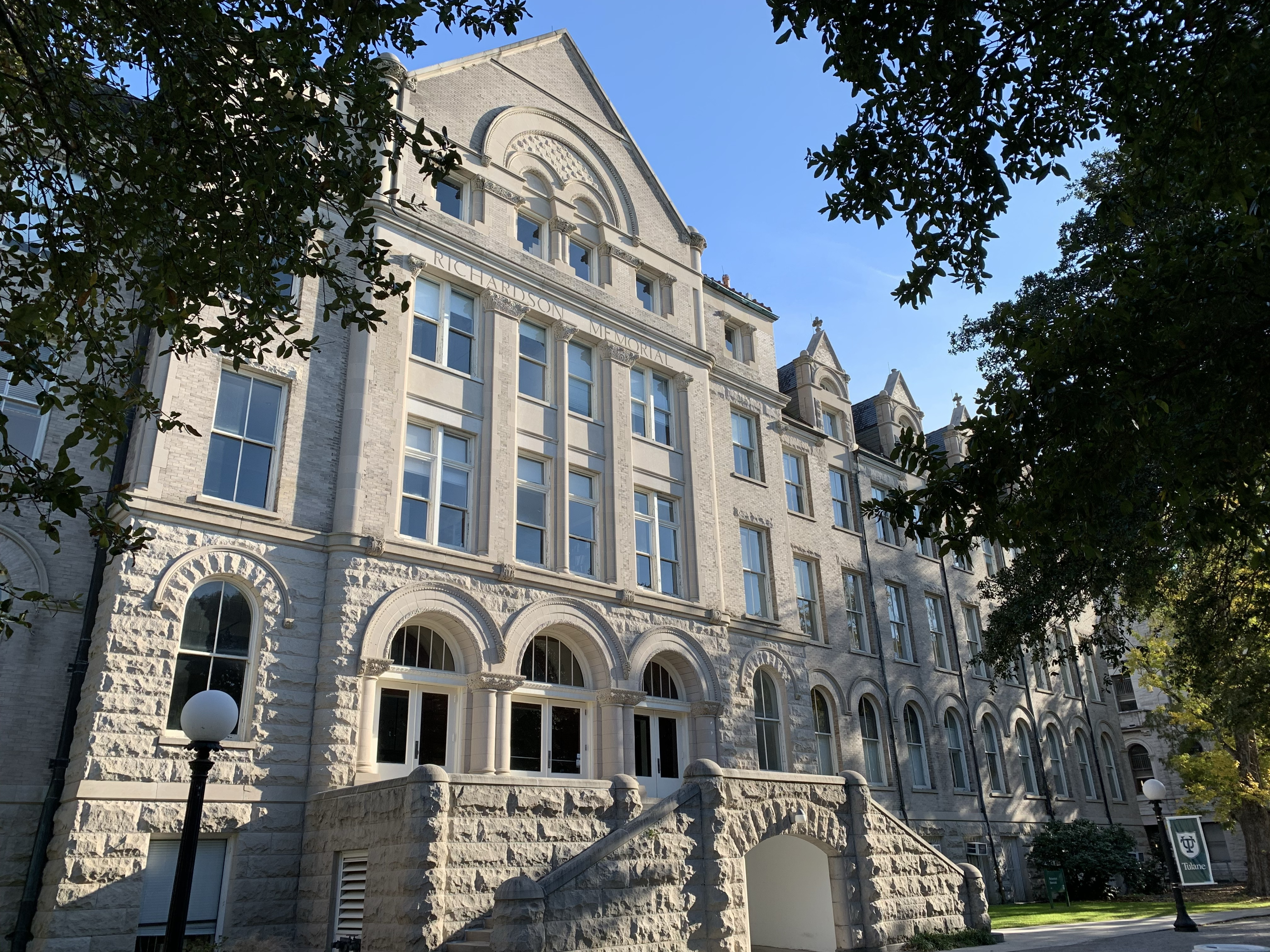
School of Architecture at Tulane University

Curtis was born on November 29, 1917, in Auburn, Alabama USA. Friends called him "Buster". Curtis completed a bachelor's degree in architecture at Tulane University in 1940. Subsequently he served in the United States Navy as a lieutenant commander in World War II. His military tour of duty included graduate level studies in the naval architecture program at the United States Naval Academy at Annapolis. This gave Curtis some training in the field of engineering.

Curts was for a time the president of International House in New Orleans. From 1978 until his death, he was a member of the architectural review panel for the United States Federal Reserve.

Curtis died on June 10, 1997, at Baptist Memorial Medical Center in New Orleans, Louisiana, of cancer. He is interred at Metairie Lake Lawn Cemetery in New Orleans.

Curtis's father, Nathaniel Cortlandt Curtis, Sr., was the first dean of the Tulane University School of Architecture. Curtis's son David Curtis is also an architect in New Orleans.

Following the sale of Curtis and Davis, Curtis formed his own architectural firm, Nathaniel Curtis, FAIA, Architect, in July 1978.

=== Arthur Quentin Davis ===
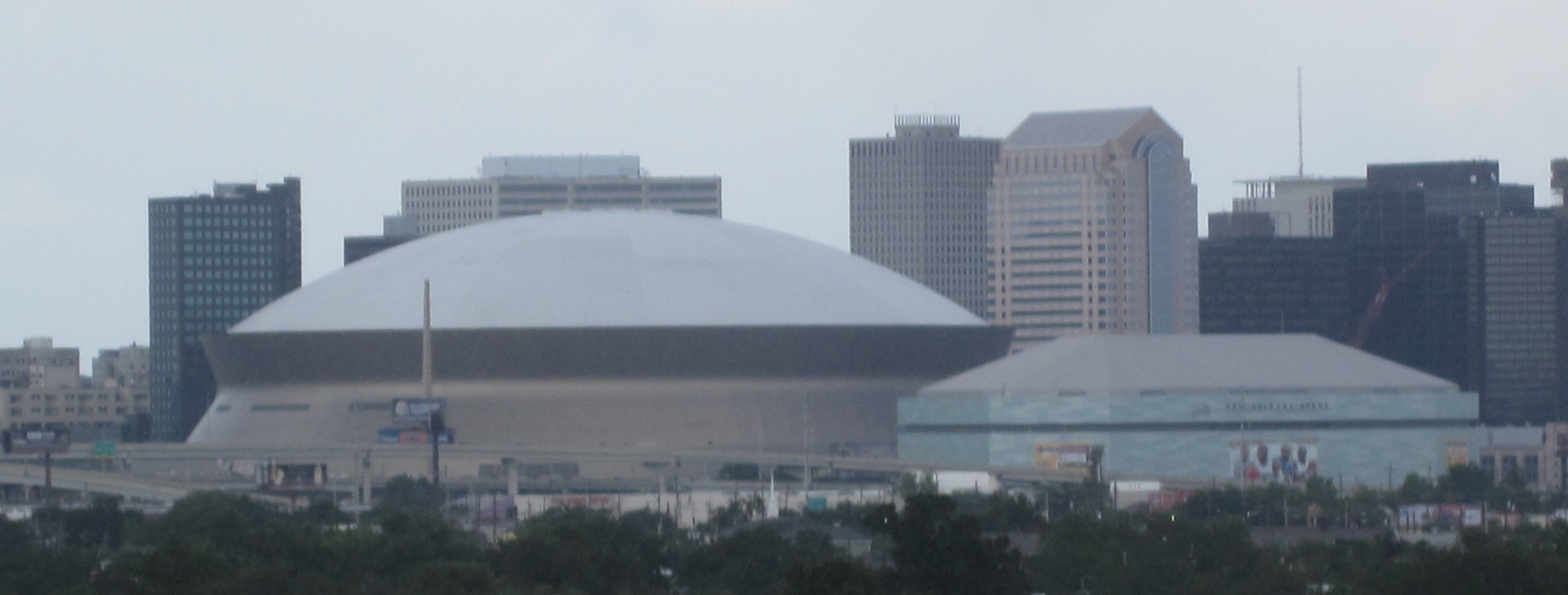
Louisiana Superdome and New Orleans Arena (to the right) in 2011

Davis was born and raised in New Orleans. He earned a bachelor's degree in architecture at Tulane University in 1942 and a master's degree in architecture at Harvard University. There he studied under Walter Gropius who was a leader in the International Style of architectural design. Davis then worked briefly for architect and industrial designer Eero Saarinen in Michigan. He expressed the idea that significant buildings should be enduring and not simply designed to last 30 years or less.

At the age of 38, Davis became a Fellow of the American Institute of Architects, then the youngest person so honored.

Following the acquisition of Curtis and Davis by Daniel, Mann, Johnson, and Mendenhall in 1978, Davis continued to work with Daniel, Mann, Johnson, and Mendenhall until 1998. At that time, he created a new architectural firm, known as Arthur Q. Davis FAIA and Associates. Their projects included the New Orleans Arena.

Davis was the first chairman of the New Orleans Jazz and Heritage Festival. He was the father of Quint Davis, who is the producer of the New Orleans Jazz and Heritage Festival. Arthur Q. Davis died in New Orleans on November 30, 2011, at age 91.

== Design style ==
Curtis and Davis architectural designs emphasized modernist aesthetics while making use of advances in materials and technologies. This included extensive use of the then-new technique of lift slab construction. Buildings designed by Curtis and Davis included ones for purposes that are commercial, educational, religious, recreational, residential, and even penal.

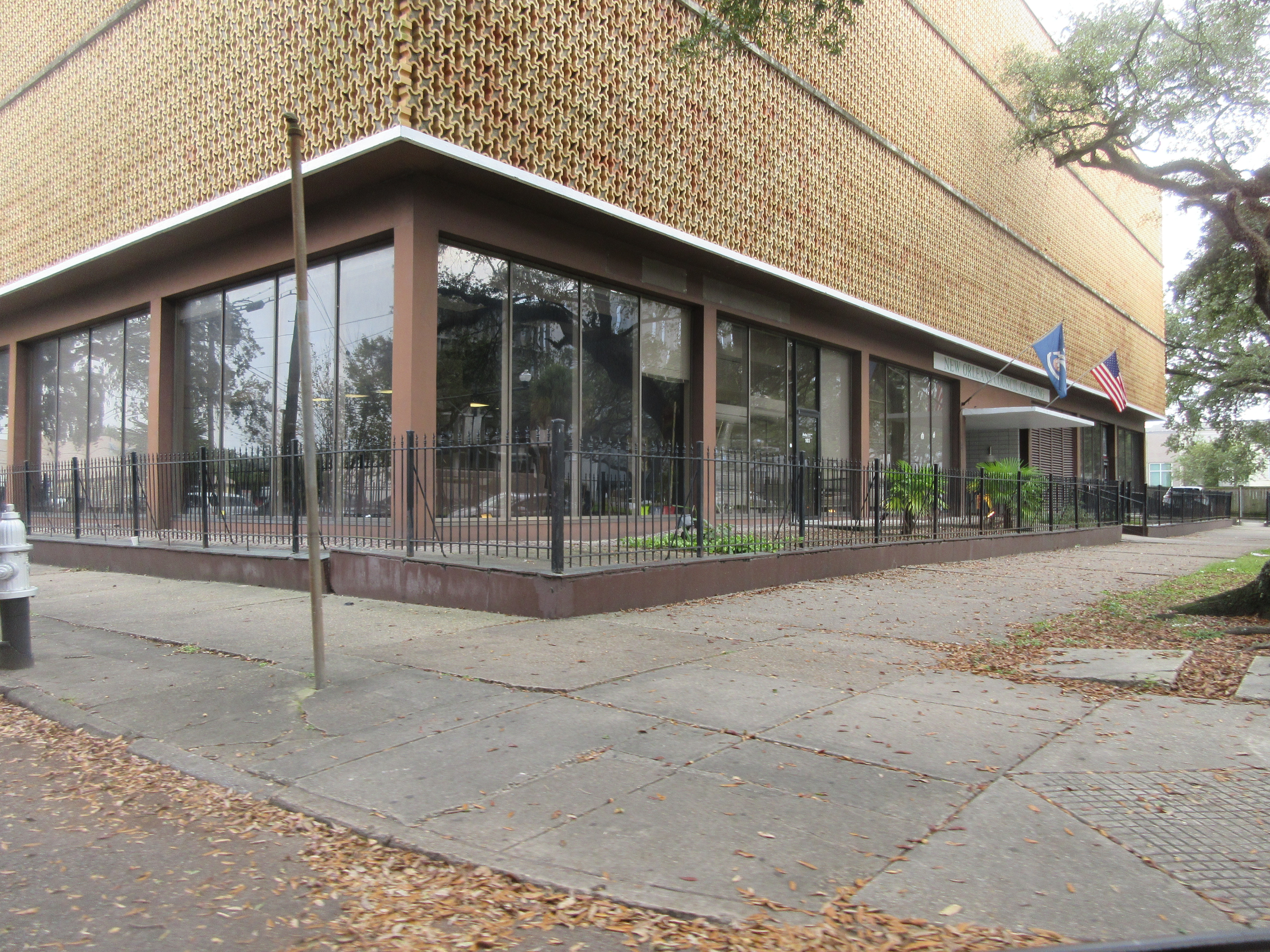
Caribe Building, headquarters of Curtis & Davis at one time. The sunbreakers are evident in the design.

The design style combined regionalism with functional characteristics in which they strived to show that the building belonged where it was built. In this respect, the firm's designs made use of courtyards, arcades, sunbreakers (brise soleil), and cross-ventilation, all being design characteristics long used in the subtropical climate of New Orleans. Many of these same characteristics can be seen, for example, in designs of plantation houses of the Antebellum South. While the designs took advantage of the latest in metal, glass, and concrete materials, they made use of local materials when possible, fitting the buildings into local landscape. An architectural historian observed that the designs sometimes reflected a fusion of Louisiana Creole tradition with the Bauhaus style, bringing about an architectural flair that is characteristic of the New Orleans area.

The modernist style of Curtis and Davis was at times poorly received in New Orleans where there was local pride in their historical styles of architectural design. In the early years of the firm, the local resistance to modernist style resulted in Curtis and Davis missing out on certain architectural design projects.

== Representative projects ==
An early project of Curtis and Davis was the Municipal Court House and Precinct Jail on Rampart Street in New Orleans. The building was demolished years later. They designed the main branch of the New Orleans Public Library. The exterior has a three-dimensional aluminum screen surrounding the exterior of the two top floors of the three-story building, shading the glass walls from the intense subtropical sunlight. The interior of the building has a flexible floor plan with glass interior walls. The building remains in use as a library as of 2020.

In 1954, Curtis and Davis designed the Caribe Building which was to serve as the firm's headquarters. A distinctive feature of the building is the brise soleil created by Moorish-style terra cotta tiles that form a screen around much of the exterior of the building. These are situated three feet out from the building walls. In this way, workers in the building could make use of the building's windows but still be protected from the heat and glare of the sun in the oppressive subtropical climate. This design is estimated to result in a one-third savings in cooling costs of the building.

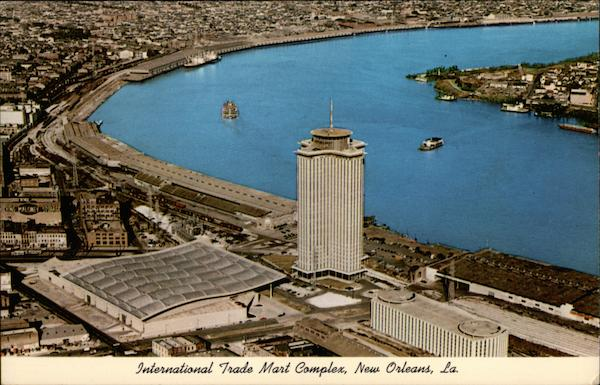
The Rivergate Convention Center is on the lower left in this aerial view.

In 1957, Curtis and Davis designed the Benjamin Franklin Institute which serves as the university medical center at the Free University of Berlin. Construction was complete in 1968. The building features façades in raw concrete and is considered an example of brutalist architecture.

In 1964 Curtis and Davis completed its design for the Rivergate Convention Center in New Orleans. A particularly distinctive feature was the roof of the building, fabricated of pressed concrete in six barrel shapes, giving an appearance of undulation. It was a functional design in that it extended 253 feet over the main exhibit hall. In that way, the main exhibit hall was free of obstructions. The Rivergate Convention Center had 130,000 square feet of exhibit space with seating for up to 17,000 people, in addition to smaller meeting rooms. The roof design is reported to be suggestive of the flow of water in the nearby Mississippi River. The Rivergate Convention Center was demolished in 1995, as it was replaced by the larger New Orleans Morial Convention Center, with the land on which the Rivergate was located becoming Harrah's Casino.

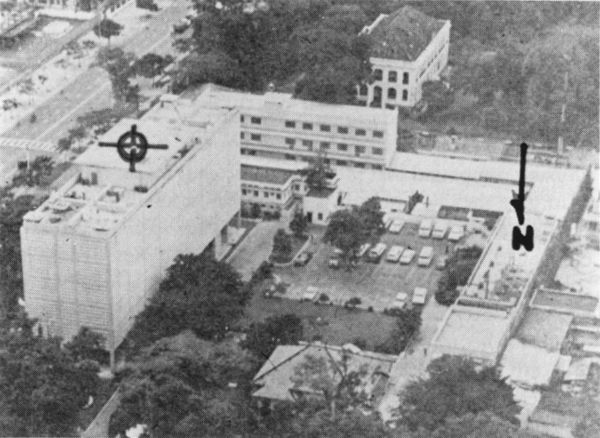
United States Embassy (Saigon)

Following the 1965 car-bombing of the United States Embassy in Vietnam, Curtis and Davis received a commission at that time to design a new embassy for the United States, in the city then known as Saigon, South Vietnam. As the commitment of the United States to Vietnam deepened, the original design of Curtis and Davis was significantly expanded by the architectural firm Adrian Wilson and Associates. The building opened in 1967. The roof of the building subsequently was the site of the helicopter evacuation after the Fall of Saigon at the end of the Vietnam War.

=== Prison design ===
In the early 1950s, Curtis and Davis was commissioned to design the new building complex for the Louisiana State Penitentiary in Angola, Louisiana. Their design for the new facility was consistent with penal reform as advocated at the time by James V. Bennett, with facilities so that the inmates could be segregated into separate housing clusters according to their age and their security custody classification. The construction practices made use of the new lift-slab technique, as well as prison labor. The prison was completed in 1956, with construction on-time and under-budget.

Among their various prison designs, Curtis and Davis served as architects for the Washington Corrections Institute in collaboration with a group of other architects, being complete in 1964. Their other prison designs included the Fox Lake Correctional Institution, in Fox Lake, Wisconsin, the Nassau County Jail in East Meadow, New York, and the Vienna Correctional Center, in Vienna, Illinois.

=== IBM Building, Pittsburgh ===
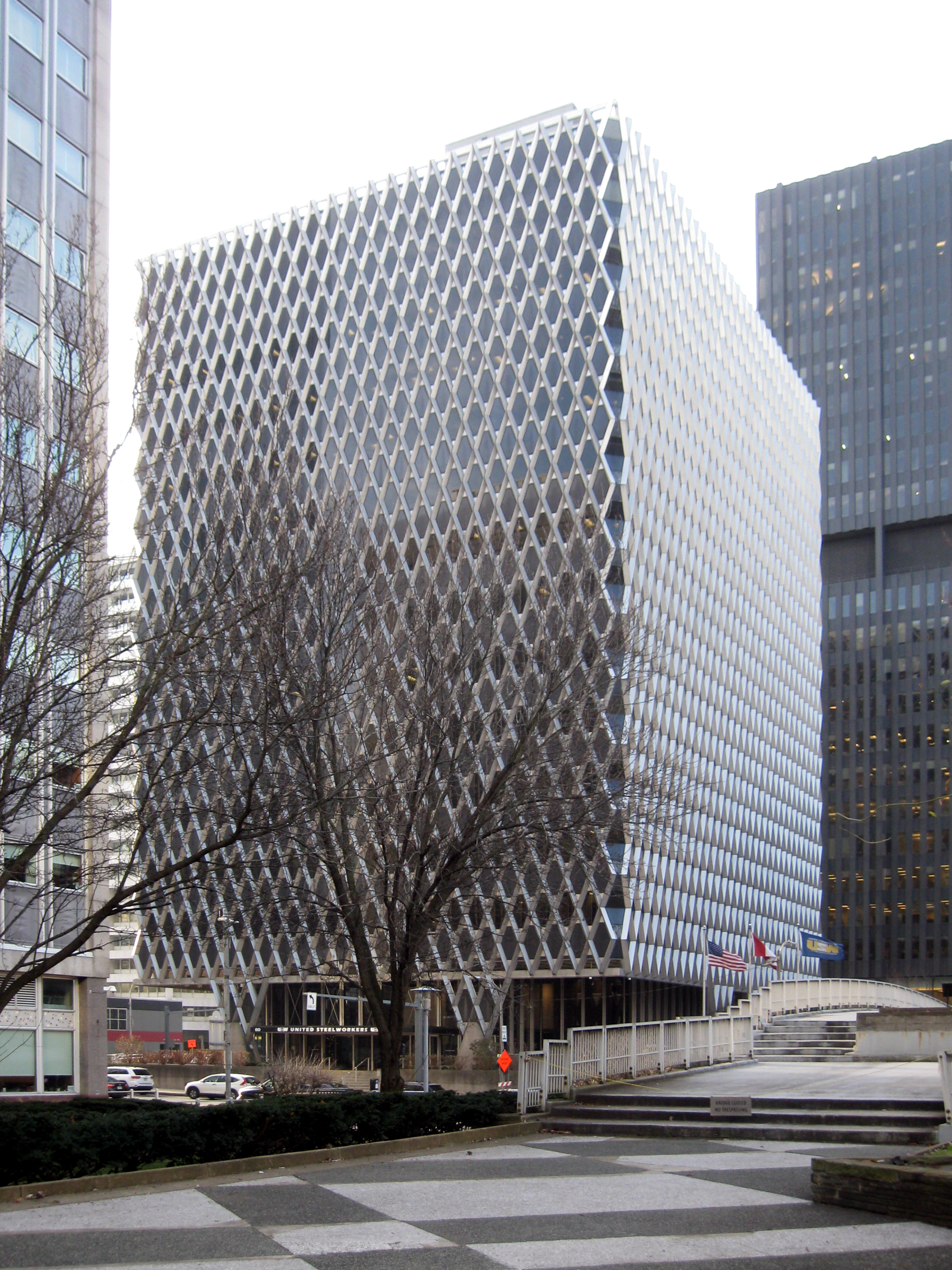
United Steelworkers Building, Pittsburgh (originally the IBM Building)

The IBM corporation was on a building spree in the early 1960s. The company commissioned Curtis and Davis to construct a building for IBM's Pittsburgh operations. This was the firm's first high-rise design, being 13 stories tall. The building opened in 1963, at which time it received accolades for its architectural design. There is a central load-bearing core and load bearing exterior walls. The building is encased in a steel lattice-work, consisting of five types of steel. The interior of the building was designed with an open, flexible floor plan. The IBM Building was a forerunner of the design for tall buildings at the time. The building remains in service and has served as the headquarters of the United Steelworkers Union, following IBM's departure.

Curtis and Davis designed other buildings for IBM, including ones in Burlington, Vermont, Jackson, Mississippi, and Shreveport, Louisiana.

=== Louisiana Superdome ===
Curtis and Davis was selected by the state of Louisiana to design the new indoor multi-purpose sports arena to be built in New Orleans, with the design being complete in 1967. Curtis and Davis intended the design of the stadium to be suggestive of the grandeur of the arenas of ancient Rome and Greece. Curtis and Davis designed the exterior of the Louisiana Superdome to have a bronze anodized finish in order to provide a distinct appearance compared to standard coatings.

The stadium was named the Mercedes-Benz Superdome from 2011 to 2021, and since 2021 has been named the Caesars Superdome. The facility continues to host major events while other dome stadiums have become obsolete. This is cited as an example of the enduring designs that Curtis and Davis sought to achieve.

=== Residential projects ===
Curtis and Davis's residential designs were mostly mid-century modern while making use of natural settings. Fifteen of their designs were constructed in the New Orleans metropolitan area, in addition to the Harkey House of Pascagoula, Mississippi.

The Curtis House is on the National Register of Historic Places. The home is located at 6161 Marquette Place in New Orleans. It was completed in 1963 for the family of Nathaniel Curtis. Architecturally, it has creole influences, with inward-facing designs, and so is a manifestation of critical regionalism. The home has many transparent walls allowing much natural lighting and is well-integrated into its natural surroundings. The Curtis House was the firm's last residential design. The home is divided into three connected pavilions, two of which were intended to be public while the third was limited to use of the immediate family. The design makes extensive use of clerestory windows. As of 2016, the house was the residence of noted architect Lee Ledbetter.

The Emerald Street residence, designed by Curtis and Davis and completed in 1953, was featured in Architectural Record in 1955.

=== Partial list of projects ===
Curtis and Davis designed more than 400 structures world-wide. The list below is non-exhaustive. Many of these projects are described online.

Representative significant architectural works
| Building name | Location | Year completed |
|---|---|---|
| Moses residence | 171 Audubon Blvd. New Orleans, LA | 1948 |
| Jewish Community Center | 5342 St Charles Ave. New Orleans, LA | 1948 |
| Caribe Building now the Financial Planning Center | 2475 Canal St. New Orleans, LA | 1954 |
| Louisiana State Penitentiary | 17544 Tunica Trace; Angola, LA | 1956 |
| New Orleans Public Library Main Branch | 291 Loyola Ave. New Orleans, LA | 1957 |
| Julian Steinberg residence | 1201 Conery St. New Orleans, LA | 1958 |
| South Terrebonne High School | 3879 La. Hwy 24; Bourg, LA | 1961 |
| IBM Building now the United Steelworkers Building | 60 Boulevard of the Allies; Pittsburgh, PA | 1963 |
| St. Frances Cabrini Church demolished in 2007 | 5500 Paris Ave. New Orleans, LA | 1963 |
| Hotel America now Spectra Boutique Apartments | 5 Constitution Ave. Hartford, CT | 1964 |
| Washington Corrections Center | 2321 W. Dayton Airport Rd. Shelton, WA | 1964 |
| Embassy of the United States, Saigon design expanded by Adrian Wilson & Associates demolished in 1998 | 4 Thong Nhut; Ho Chi Minh City, Vietnam | 1967 |
| Klinikum Steglitz (hospital of the Free University of Berlin) now Charité Campus Benjamin Franklin | Hindenburgdamm 30; D-12203 Berlin, Germany | 1968 |
| Rivergate Convention Center demolished in 1995 | 8 Canal St. New Orleans, LA | 1968 |
| James V. Forrestal Building | 1000 Independence Ave. SW; Washington, DC | 1969 |
| New Orleans Marriott Hotel | 555 Canal St. New Orleans, LA | 1972 |
| Louisiana Superdome | 1500 Sugar Bowl Dr. New Orleans, LA | 1975 |
| Hyatt Regency Hotel | 601 Loyola Ave. New Orleans, LA | 1976 |

== Controversies ==
In the 1950s, the newly opened Municipal Court House and Precinct Jail included a nude sculpture by Enrique Alférez. Curtis and Davis had designed the building with the sculpture in mind. Local people, especially parishioners at nearby Our Lady of Guadalupe Roman Catholic Church, objected to the nude art. As a result, the sculpture was removed and subsequently lost for many years. The sculpture, known as "The Family", was retrieved and became part of an Alférez collection in 2015.

In 1974, Curtis and Davis allegedly donated $15,625 in political contributions in exchange for a half million dollars' worth of contracts.

The 1995 demolition of the Rivergate Convention Center was controversial because it was demolished in favor of construction of a new building considered architecturally inferior but resulted in construction jobs that put local politicians in a favorable light. Preservationists believed that the Rivergate Convention Center could have been easily repurposed at significantly lower cost.

== End of the firm ==
By the 1970s, as a result of the economic downturn related to the 1973 oil crisis, Curtis and Davis focused on developing new design projects in the Middle East, especially Saudi Arabia. Despite several promising leads, none resulted in new construction.

Early in the history of the firm, both Curtis and Davis worked together closely. As the firm expanded, they worked separately, ultimately resulting in the emergence of differing ideas between them about the firm's management. With the financial effects of economic downturn in the mid-1970s, Davis proposed selling the firm, to which Curtis agreed. The sale to Daniel, Mann, Johnson and Mendenhall resulted in the end of Curtis and Davis as a firm.

== Awards and honors ==
Curtis and Davis won a significant number of architectural awards. Among these were several Progressive Architecture Awards, including the 1957 award for their design of the New Public Library Main Branch, for risk-taking designs that advance the practice of architecture. The firm received local, regional, and national awards from the American Institute of Architects. Other awards included an award for the Top Manufacturing Plant in 1969 for the Westinghouse Electric Co. plant design in Tampa, Florida, given by Modern Manufacturing Magazine, and awards from the New York Association of Architects, the New Jersey Association of Architects, the Louisiana Architecture Association, the Vieux Carré Commission, the National Conference on Religious Architecture, Institutions Magazine, and others. A complete list of awards for Curtis and Davis is available.

The Ogden Museum of Southern Art ran an exhibition on the architectural achievements of Arthur Q. Davis in 2009, including his time with Curtis and Davis.

== Gallery ==
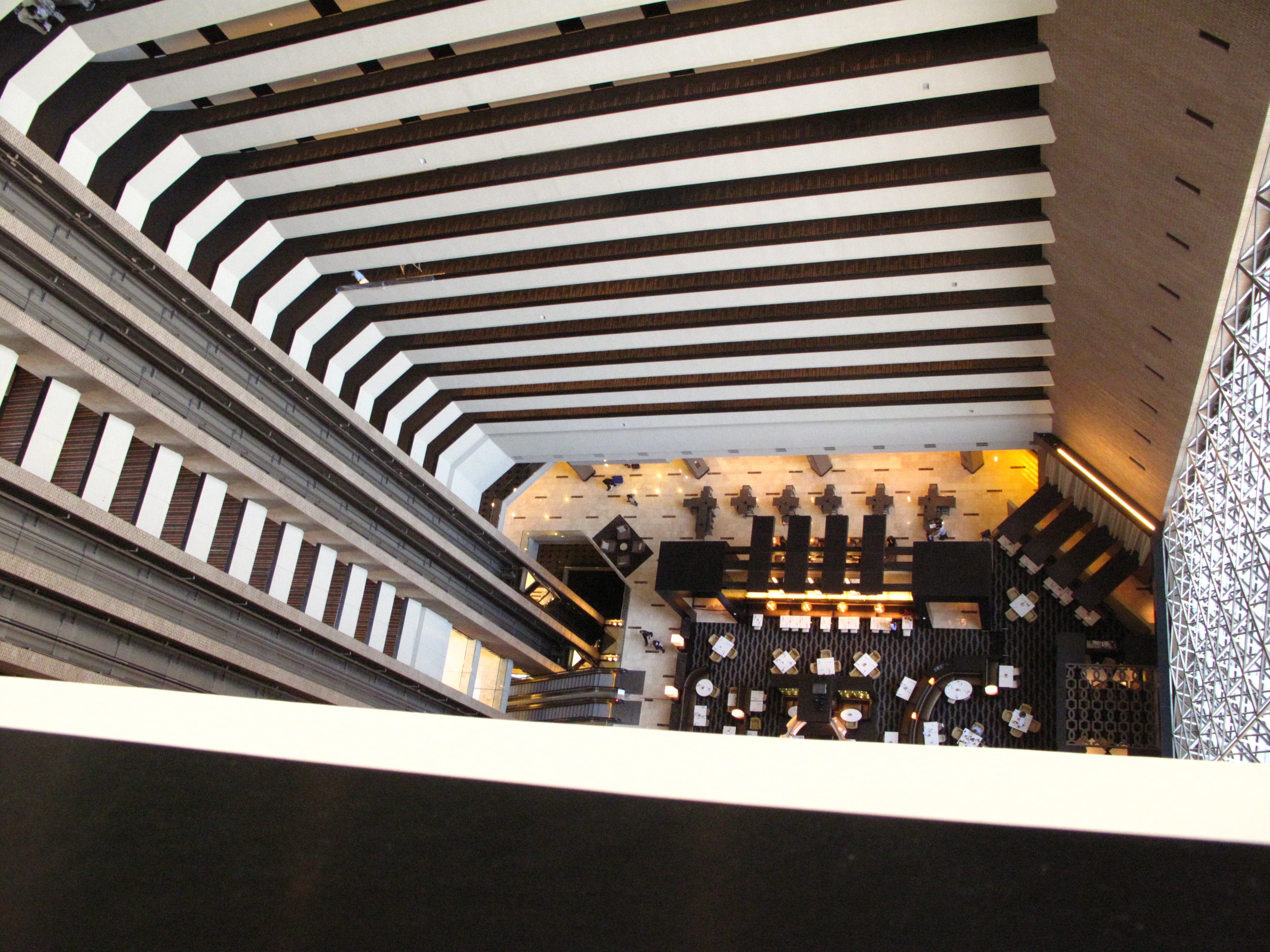
Downward view of the interior atrium of the Hyatt Regency Hotel in New Orleans as seen in 2012

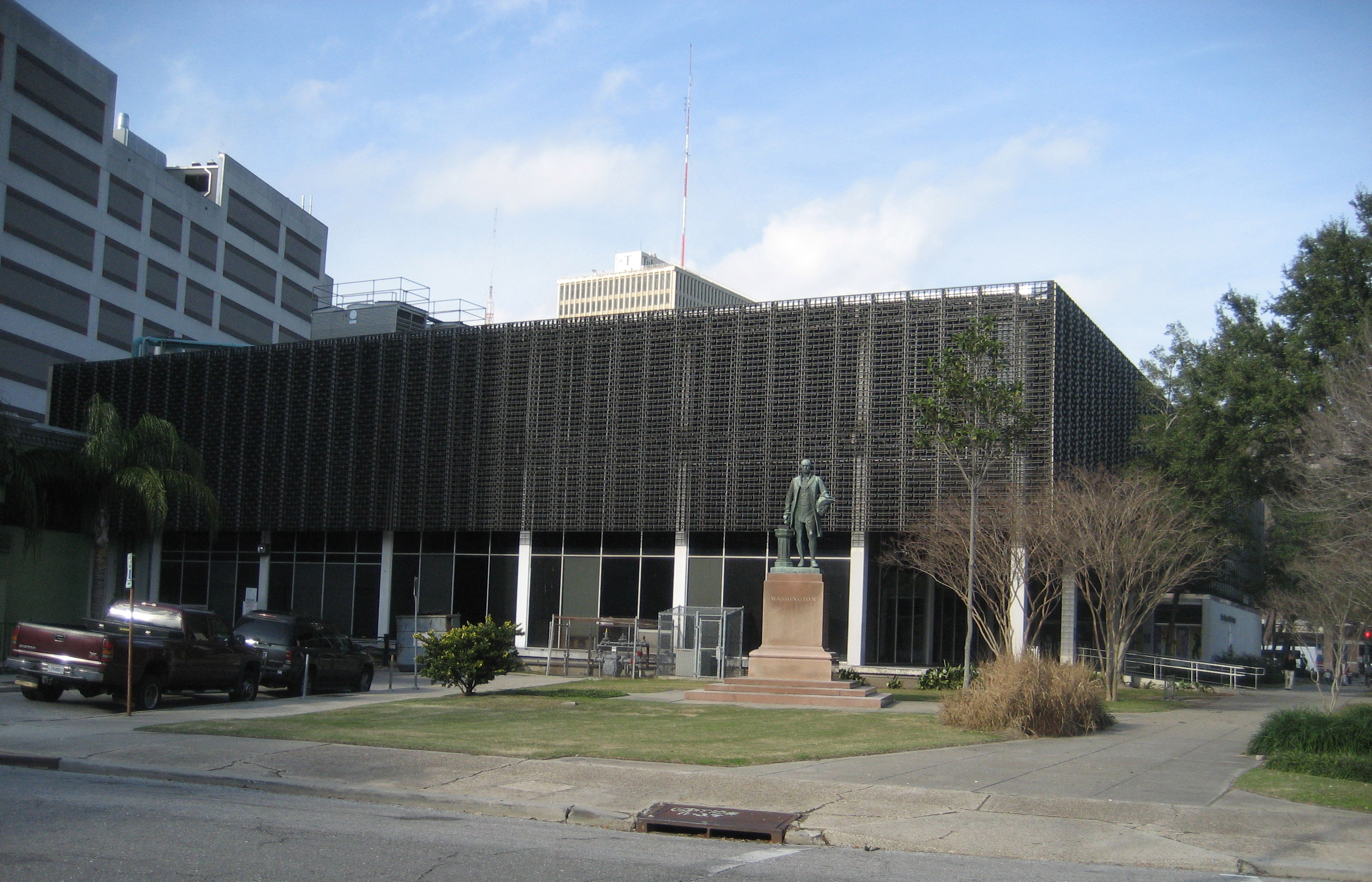
Main branch of the New Orleans Public Library

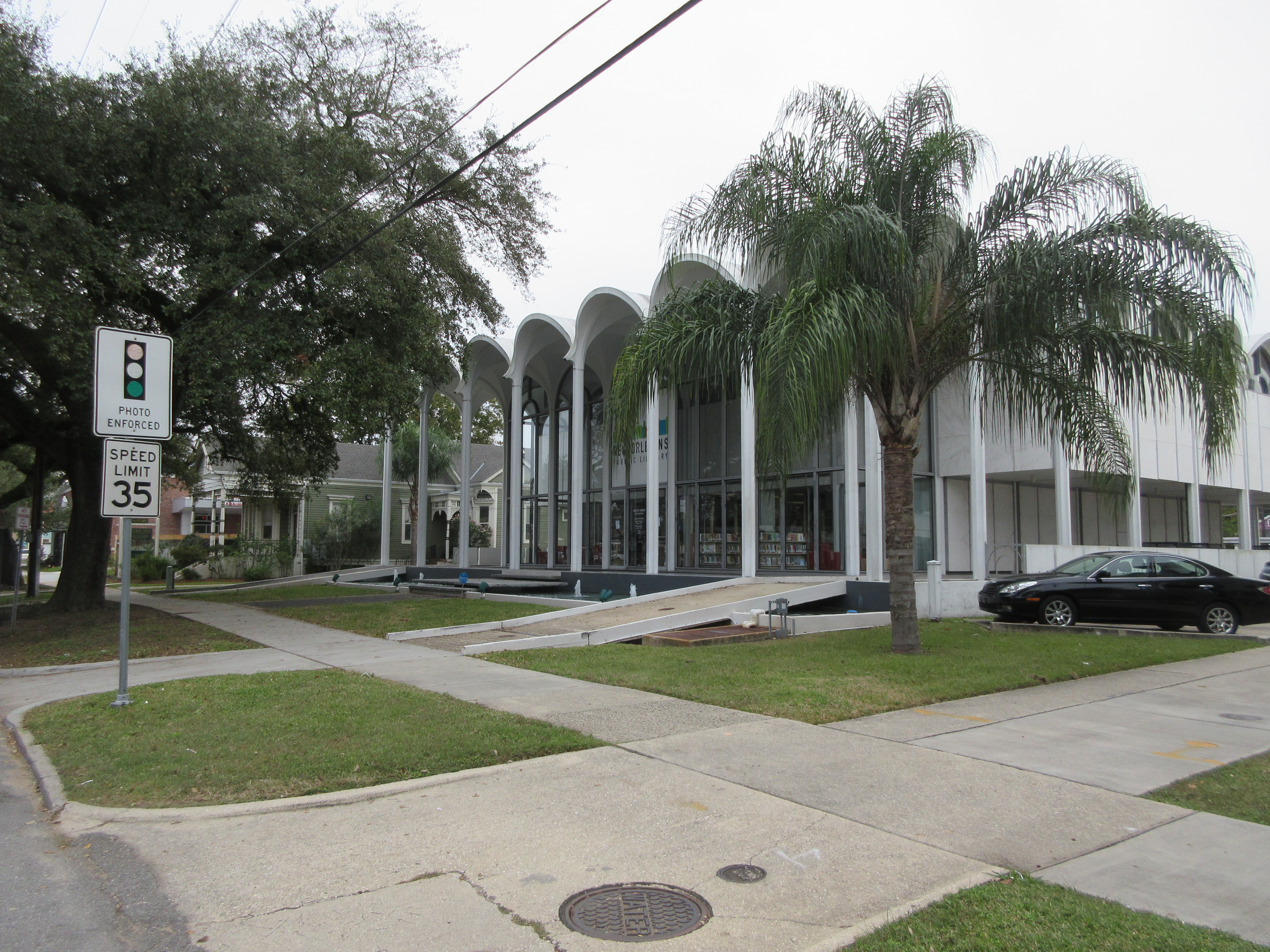
New Orleans Public Library Mid-City Branch, originally the Automotive Life Insurance Building (photo courtesy of Infrogmation)

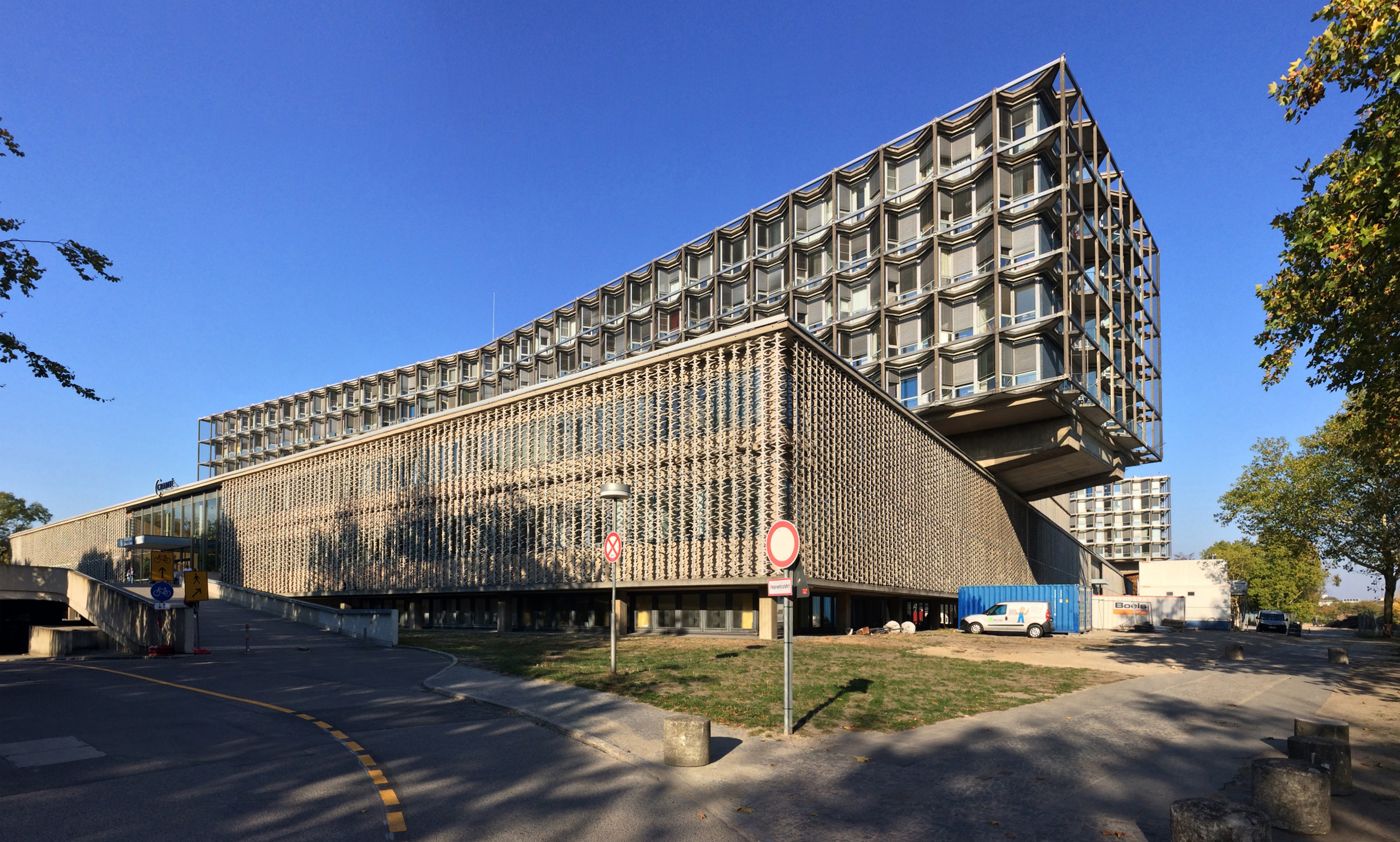
Campus Benjamin Franklin of the Charité Hospital Berlin, Germany

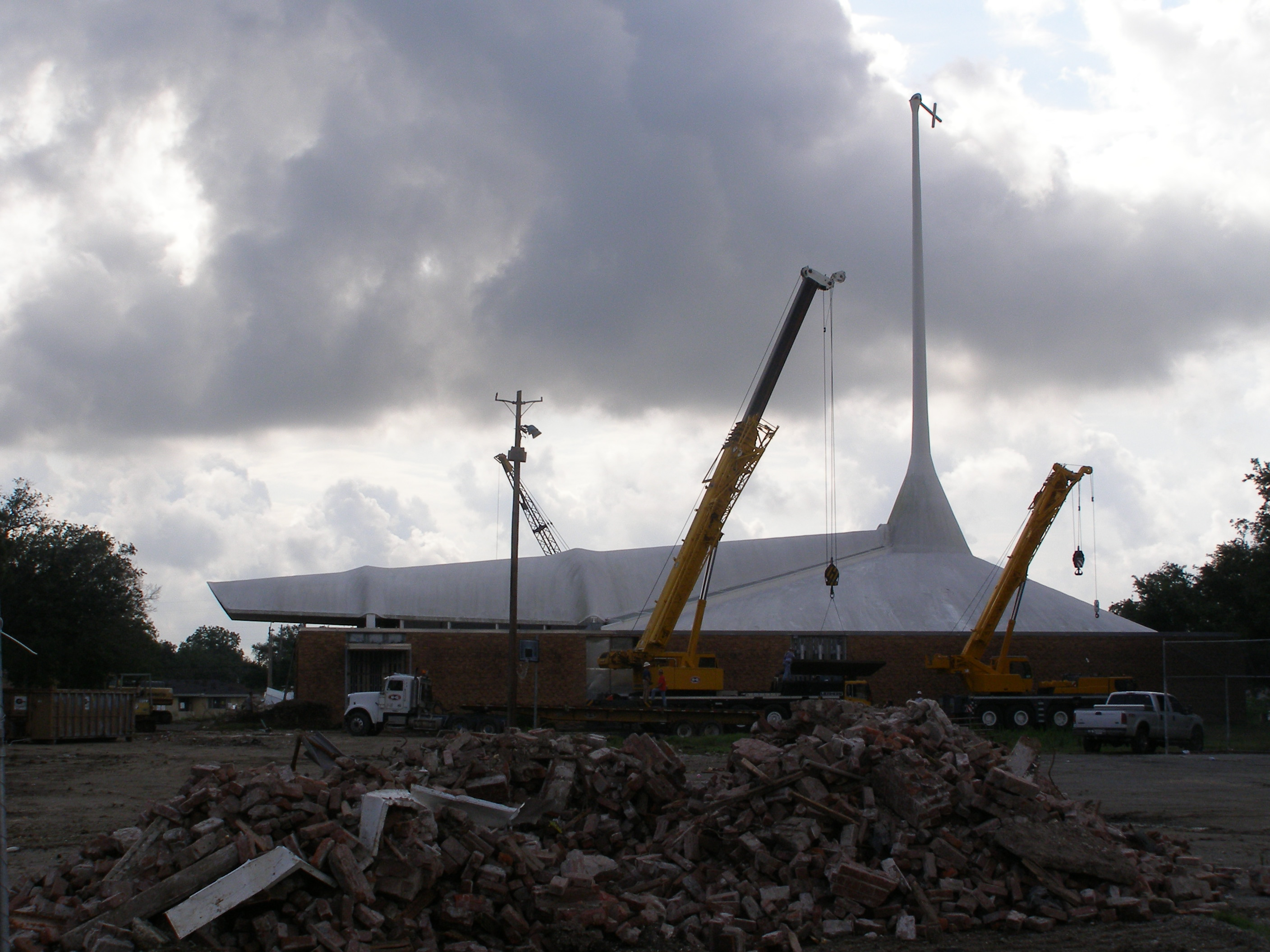
St Frances Cabrini Church as demolition commenced in 2007 (photo courtesy of Infrogmation)

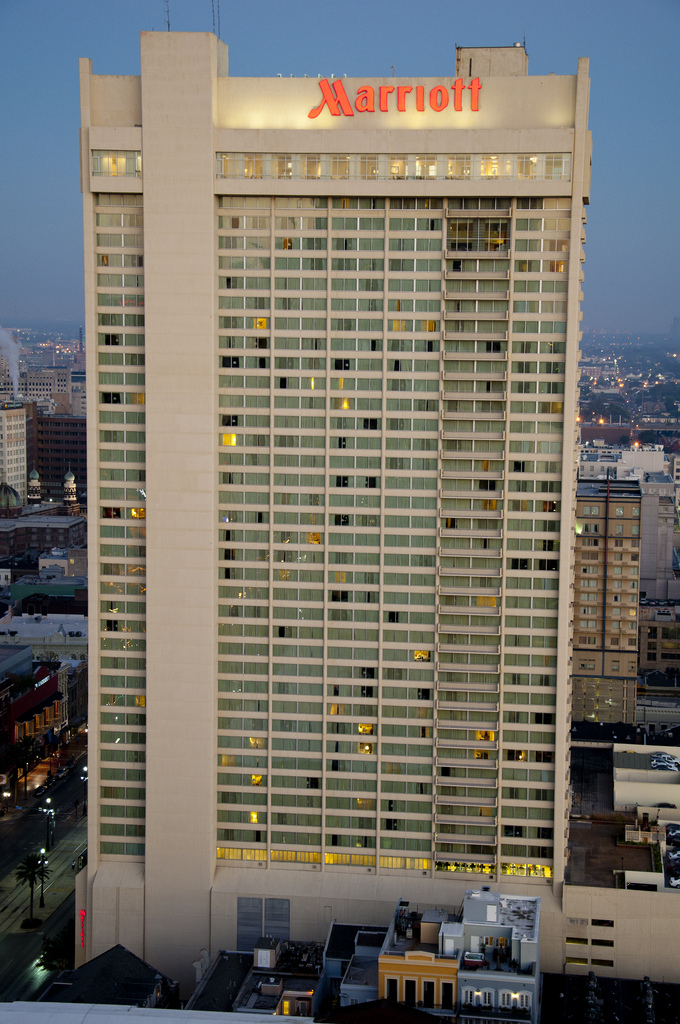
New Orleans Marriott Hotel

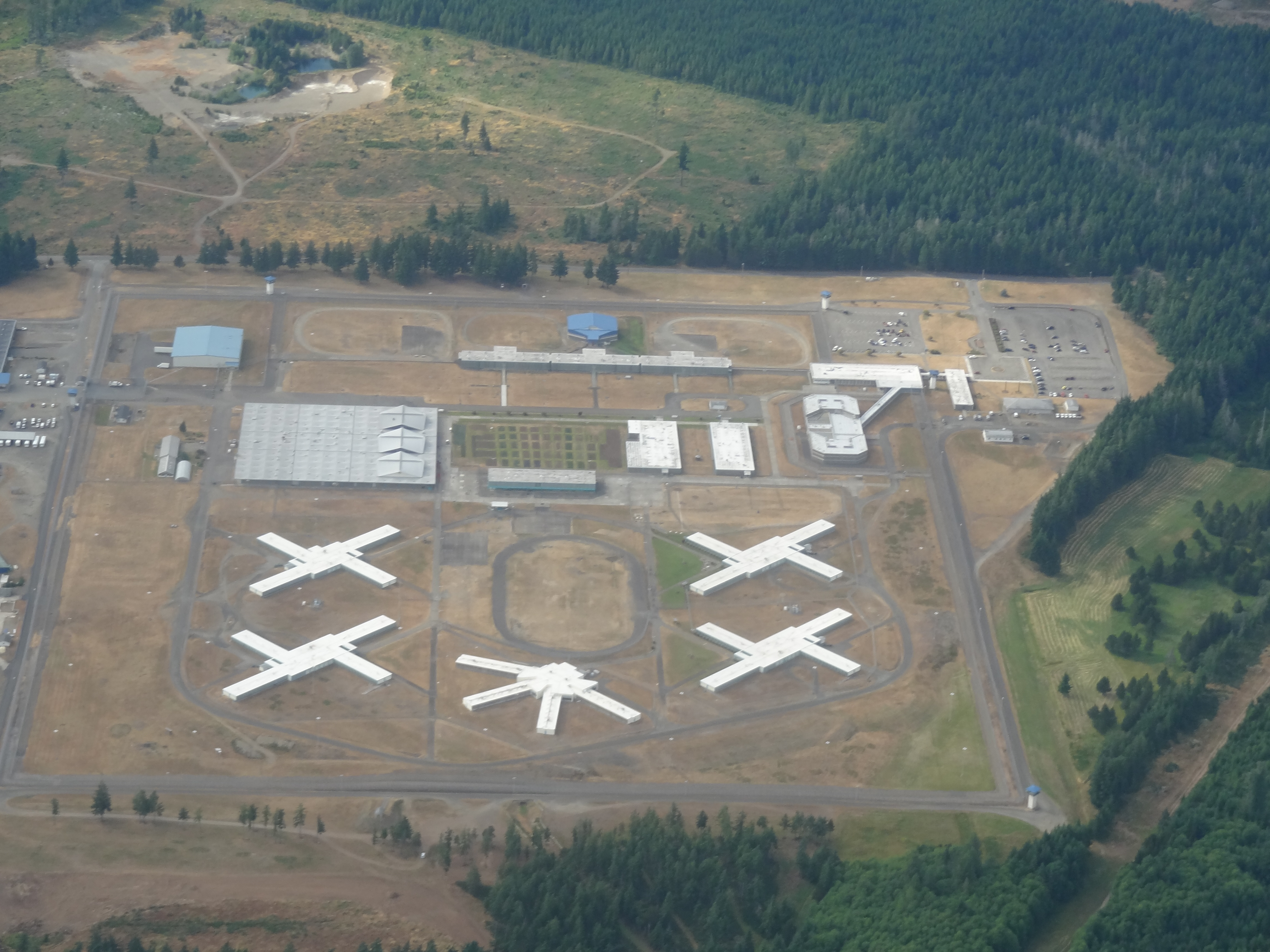
Aerial view of Washington Corrections Center

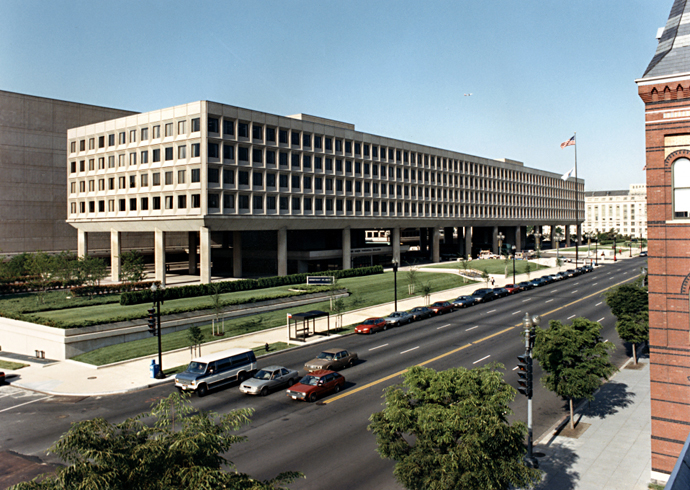
James V. Forrestal Building in Washington, D.C.
