= St. Frances Cabrini Church (New Orleans) =

Roman Catholic Church, no longer extant

Coordinates: 30.0141°N 90.0756°W

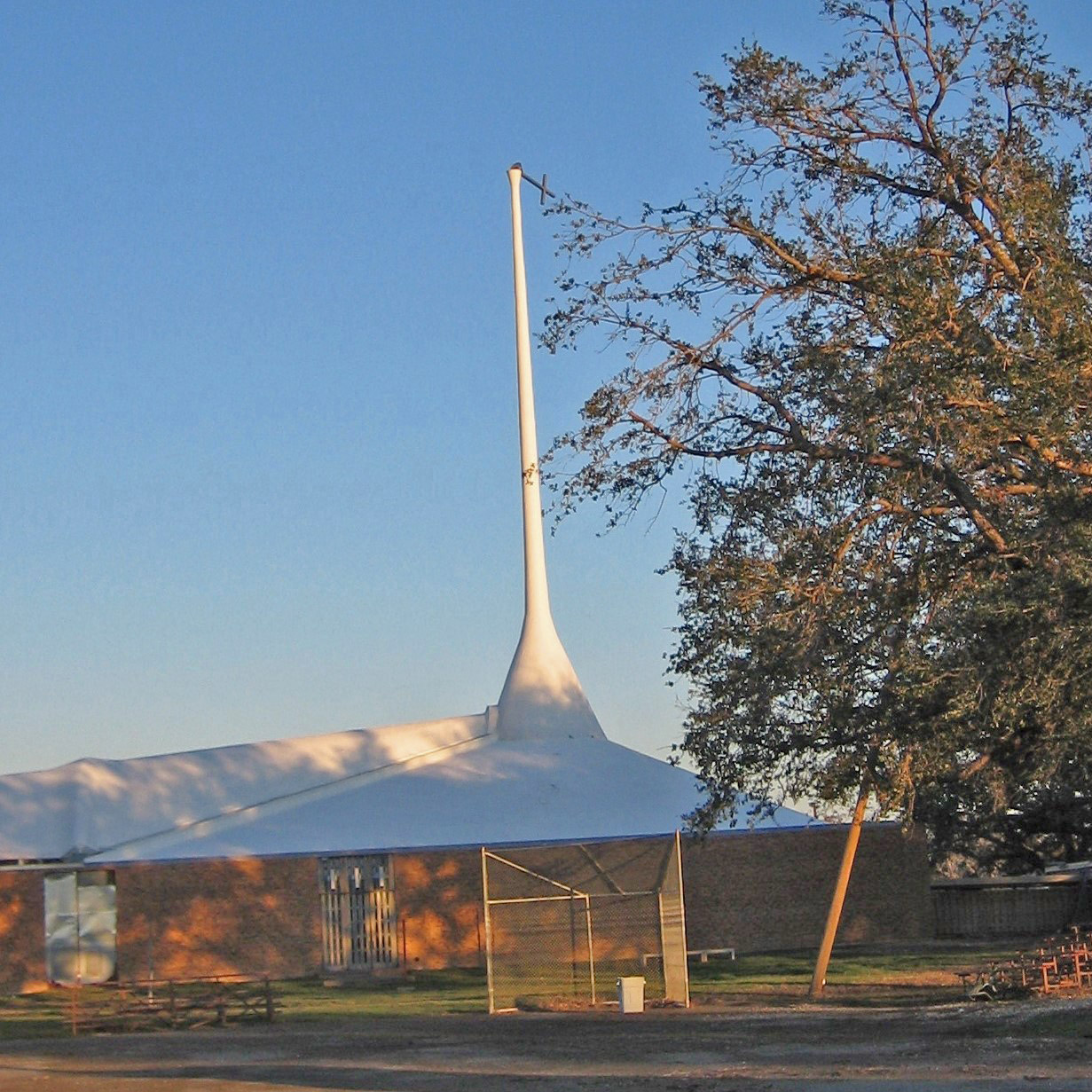
- Cabrini Church in New Orleans, with bent steeple
- St. Frances Cabrini Church
- Location: 5500 Paris Avenue; New Orleans, Louisiana, USA
- Country: United States
- Denomination: Roman Catholic

History
- Former name: Cathedral by the Lake
- Status: Demolished
- Founder: Gerard Louis Frey
- Dedicated: 1963

Architecture
- Architect(s): Curtis and Davis
- Architectural type: Modern
- Style: Modernist
- Demolished: 2007

Specifications
- Capacity: 1500
- Materials: Prestressed concrete Brick

Administration
- Archdiocese: Archdiocese of New Orleans
- Parish: St. Frances Cabrini

St. Frances Cabrini Church was a Roman Catholic parish church in New Orleans, Louisiana, from 1963 until 2005, when it was extensively damaged by floodwaters of Hurricane Katrina. The church was designed in the modernist style by New Orleans architectural firm Curtis and Davis. Their design was intended to facilitate parishioners' participation in religious ceremonies. The church building did not re-open after Hurricane Katrina and was demolished in 2007 amid controversy over architectural preservation.

== Early parish history ==
In 1952, the Roman Catholic Archdiocese of New Orleans purchased land in the Gentilly neighborhood of New Orleans to serve the rapidly growing Roman Catholic population in that area of the city which was relatively new in the 1950s and 1960s. The parish was bordered by Bayou St. John to the west, the London Avenue Canal to the east, by Lake Pontchartrain on the north, and extended in a southerly direction into the Mid-City neighborhood of New Orleans. The archdiocese soon established St. Frances Xavier Cabrini School with a plan to construct a parish church thereafter. In the first several years of the parish, the parish church was a temporary quonset hut structure in a military style. Gerard Louis Frey was appointed pastor of the new parish.

The Archdiocese of New Orleans commissioned the New Orleans architectural firm of Curtis and Davis to design the new parish church. Pastor Gerard Louis Frey directed that the design should be consistent with the directives of the Second Vatican Council in that the design should facilitate participation of the congregation in religious services. While the Sacred Liturgy of the Second Vatican Council had not been signed at the time of design, the Constitution of the Sacred Liturgy from the Second Vatican Council was widely anticipated.

The name of the parish and ultimately the church itself was to commemorate St. Frances Xavier Cabrini's visitation of New Orleans in 1892. The purpose of her visit was to help overcome the widespread hostility and prejudice in New Orleans against Italian immigrants and Italian Americans that resulted in the 1891 New Orleans lynchings and on-going discrimination.

== Architectural design ==
Sidney Folse Jr. of Curtis and Davis was the lead architect in the project. Consistent with the directives of parish pastor Gerard Louis Frey, Folse's design was heavily influenced by the liturgical changes being proposed at the time by the Second Vatican Council, which had a further effect of encouraging modernist designs. These directives were intended to foster unity among worshipers in both a physical and symbolic way.

In the design, the church had three sets of pews extending out from the sanctuary, each set in an arched concrete canopy, suggestive of the Quonset hut structure of the original parish church. The arched concrete canopies made use of the pre-stressed thin shell concrete that architects Curtis and Davis used in other projects. There was an entrance at the end of each of the arched concrete canopies. The church seated 1500 attendees with all within 100 ft (30 m) of the altar.

The church sanctuary had an arched canopy, also of concrete, with four broadly spread columns that extended through the roof, tapering in the spire, which was 135 ft (41 m) in height. The cross at the top of the spire was thereby visible throughout the parish neighborhood that it served.

The exterior of the church at levels below the arched canopies were made of brick, in the same style as the mid-century modern homes that were typical of the Gentilly neighborhood of St. Frances Cabrini Parish. On the same property was the parish school, St. Frances Cabrini Elementary School, which was designed by Curtis and Davis, in 1957 prior to the church design.

Archbishop John Patrick Cody presided over the 1963 dedication of St. Frances Cabrini Church.

=== Awards and reception ===
External media
- Media links for St. Frances Cabrini Church
- Photographs of the interior and exterior of the church
- Photograph of the chancel area of St. Frances Cabrini Church, from the Preservation Resource Center of New Orleans
- An aerial view of St. Frances Cabrini Church, from a document by the Louisiana Department of Culture, Recreation & Tourism

Curtis and Davis received an Award of Merit by the Louisiana Architects Association for the church design. The firm also received honorable mention from the Church Architectural Guild of America.

A 2006 article in The New York Times stated that the church received mixed reviews from other architects. The article compared the structure to a giant kitchen appliance while also stating that it was an important local example of modernist design.

Philip Hannan, who became archbishop of New Orleans shortly after at the time the church was dedicated, was skeptical of the practicality of the design once construction was complete. In his autobiography, Hannan wrote:

"Every time a breeze would blow, the spire would wiggle and shake part of the curved roof loose, leading to continuous leaks. Cabrini's design may have won some national architectural awards, but that leaky roof was flawed and a maintenance nightmare."

== Parish fate ==
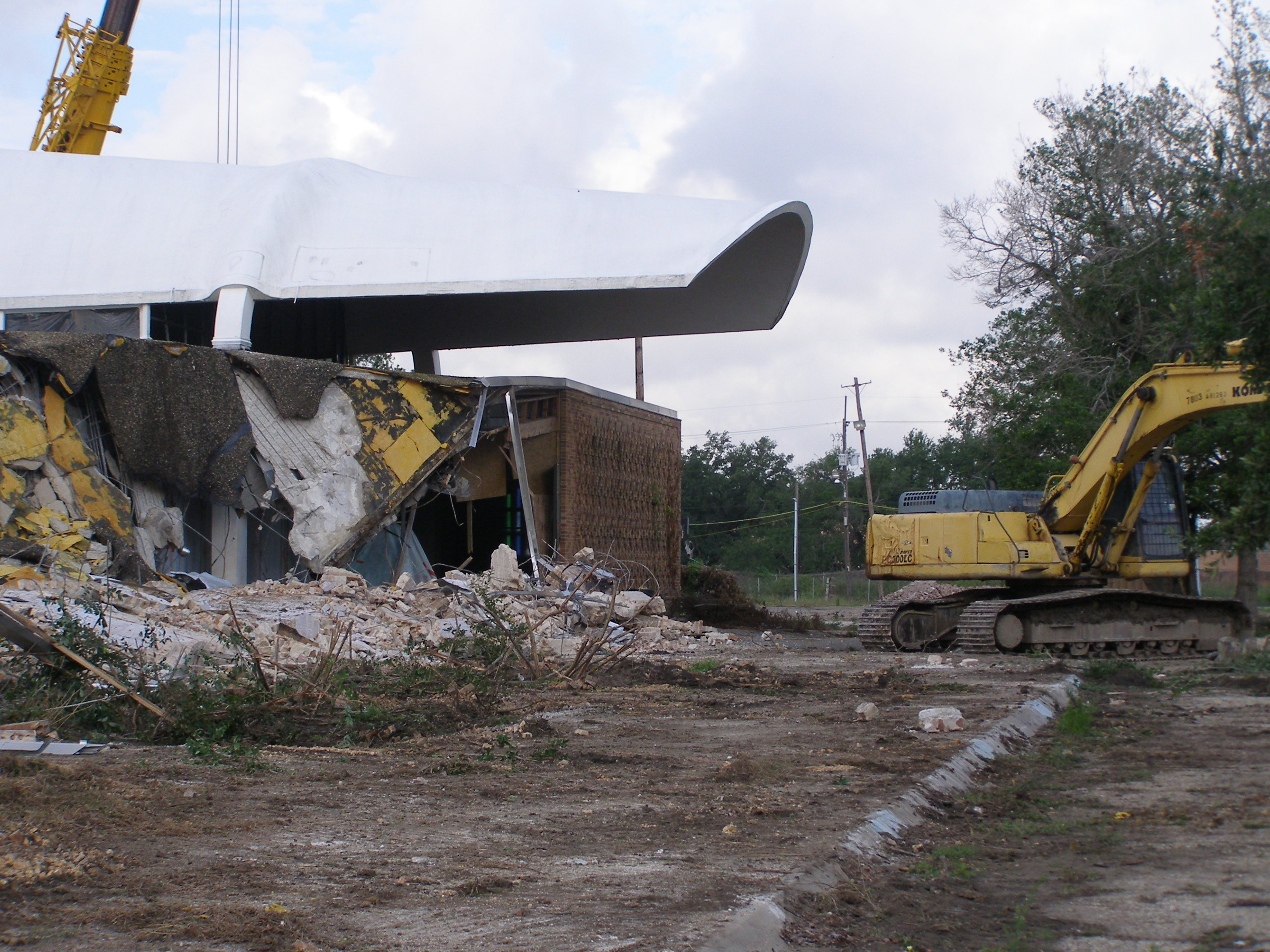
St. Frances Cabrini Church as it was being demolished in 2007

St. Frances Cabrini Church was heavily damaged late August 2005 by Hurricane Katrina, rendering it unusable. Floodwaters from the breach of the London Avenue Canal inundated the church. Following the disaster, there was contentious debate about restoration of the damaged structure. Preservationists favored restoration of the church. Others felt that the decline in the nearby population, the cost of restoration, and the need to construct a new building to keep the nearby Holy Cross High School in the Gentilly neighborhood of the section of New Orleans meant that the church should be demolished. The Archdiocese of New Orleans ultimately selected demolition, with the task of demolition being complete in 2007.

Following permanent closure of St. Frances Cabrini Church, the parish merged with neighboring parishes to form Transfiguration of the Lord Parish. Nearby Holy Cross High School had also been extensively damaged in Hurricane Katrina. Following demolition of St. Frances Cabrini Church, Holy Cross High School was re-built on the site of the church.

== Notable people ==
Capital punishment abolition advocate Sister Helen Prejean served as religious education director at St. Frances Cabrini Parish and also as a teacher at the affiliated school.

The first pastor of St. Frances Cabrini Church was Gerard Louis Frey who later became a prominent Roman Catholic Bishop in the United States.
