= Chavonda Jacobs-Young =

American government executive (born 1967)

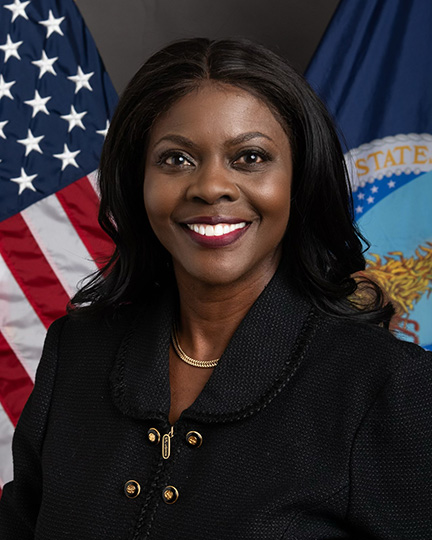

Under Secretary of Agriculture for Research, Education, and Economics
- In office June 8, 2022 – January 20, 2025
- President: Joe Biden
- Preceded by: Catherine Woteki (2017)
- Succeeded by: Scott H. Hutchins

Administrator of the Agricultural Research Service
- In office February 2014 – June 8, 2022
- President: Barack Obama; Donald Trump; Joe Biden
- Succeeded by: Simon Liu

Personal details
- Born: 1967 (age 58–59) Augusta, Georgia
- Education: North Carolina State University; American University

Chavonda J. Jacobs-Young (born 1967) is an American government executive who served as the Under Secretary of Agriculture for Research, Education, and Economics from 2022 to 2025. Jacobs-Young was previously the administrator of the Agricultural Research Service, first appointed in February 2014; she was the first female and person of color to lead the agency. In 1998, Jacobs-Young became the first African-American woman to earn a Ph.D. in paper science.

== Early life and education ==
Jacobs-Young is a native of Augusta, Georgia. She graduated from Hephzibah High School in 1985. During high school and her time at North Carolina State University, she participated in the high jump event and was a three time Atlantic Coast Conference champion. Jacobs-Young earned a B.S. in paper science and engineering (1989, NC State) and an M.S. in wood and paper science (1992, NC State). Then in 1998, she earned her Ph.D. in paper science from North Carolina State University. In 2008, Jacobs-Young received an Executive Leadership Certificate in Public Policy Implementation from American University in Washington, D.C.

== Career ==
After completion of her Ph.D., she worked as an assistant professor of Paper Science and Engineering at the University of Washington from 1995 until 2002.

In 2002, Jacobs-Young was approached about joining the federal government. She saw an opportunity to learn about federal service and took a job as a National Program Leader in the Cooperative State Research, Education, and Extension Service. Eventually she served as the senior policy analyst for agriculture in the White House Office of Science and Technology Policy. In this capacity she supported the President's science advisor and others within the Executive Office of the President on a variety of agricultural science activities. She worked across the Federal Government to improve interagency cooperation and collaboration on high-priority scientific issues.

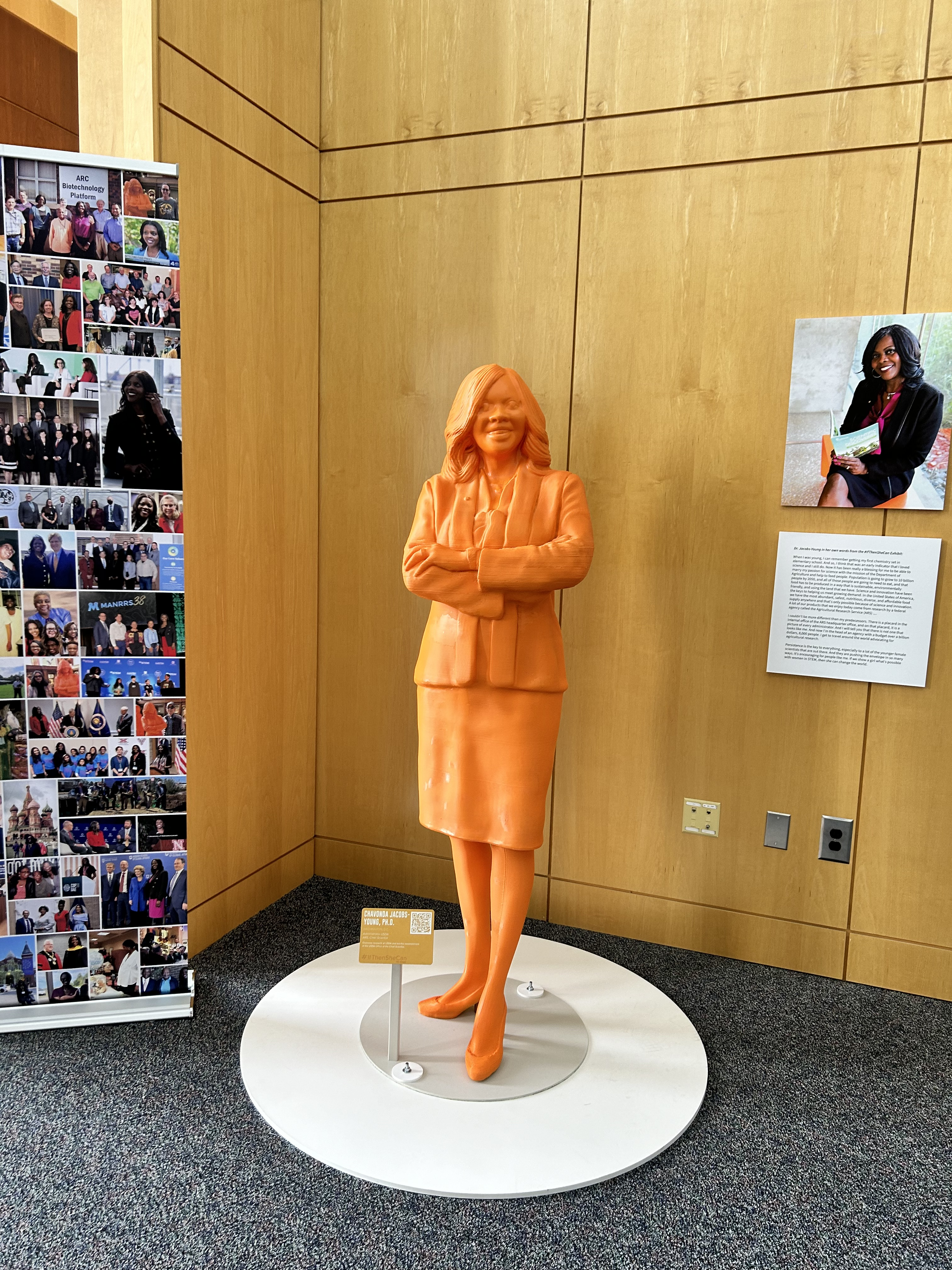
Dr. Chavonda Jacobs-Young #IfThenSheCan statue on display at the U.S. National Agricultural Library

When she returned full-time to USDA in 2010, Jacobs-Young helped establish and served as the Director of the USDA Office of the Chief Scientist. There, she facilitated the coordination of scientific leadership across the department and ensured the highest standards of intellectual rigor and scientific integrity for the research being disseminated from the department. Jacobs-Young then served as the acting director for the USDA's National Institute of Food and Agriculture before joining the Agricultural Research Service in 2012 as Associate Administrator for Research Programs. She is a member of the United States Senior Executive Service, a Fellow of the American Association for the Advancement of Science, a member of the National Academy of Public Administration, and a Presidential Rank Award winner. She was nominated in July 2021 for the position Under Secretary of Agriculture for Research, Education, and Economics. On June 8, 2022, Jacobs-Young was confirmed to the position, becoming the first woman of color in the post.

In March 2022, Jacobs-Young was included in #IfThenSheCan - The Exhibit around the National Mall in celebration of Women's History Month; the exhibit features 120 life-size statues of women who work in STEM fields.
