= Point farm =

Agricultural economics term

Point farms are farms with fewer than $1,000 in sales but that have "points" worth at least $1,000. (The official definition of a farm for census purposes is “any place from which $1,000 or more of agricultural products were produced and sold or normally would have been sold during the census year;” if a place does not have $1,000 in sales, a point system assigns values for acres of various crops and head of various livestock species to estimate a normal level of sales.)

Point farms tend to be very small. Some, however, may normally have large sales, but experience low sales in a particular year due to bad weather, disease, or other factors. Both the Economic Research Service (ERS) Agricultural Resource Management Survey (ARMS) and the census of agriculture use the point system to help identify farms meeting the current definition.
