= Catherine Woteki =

American agriculture official

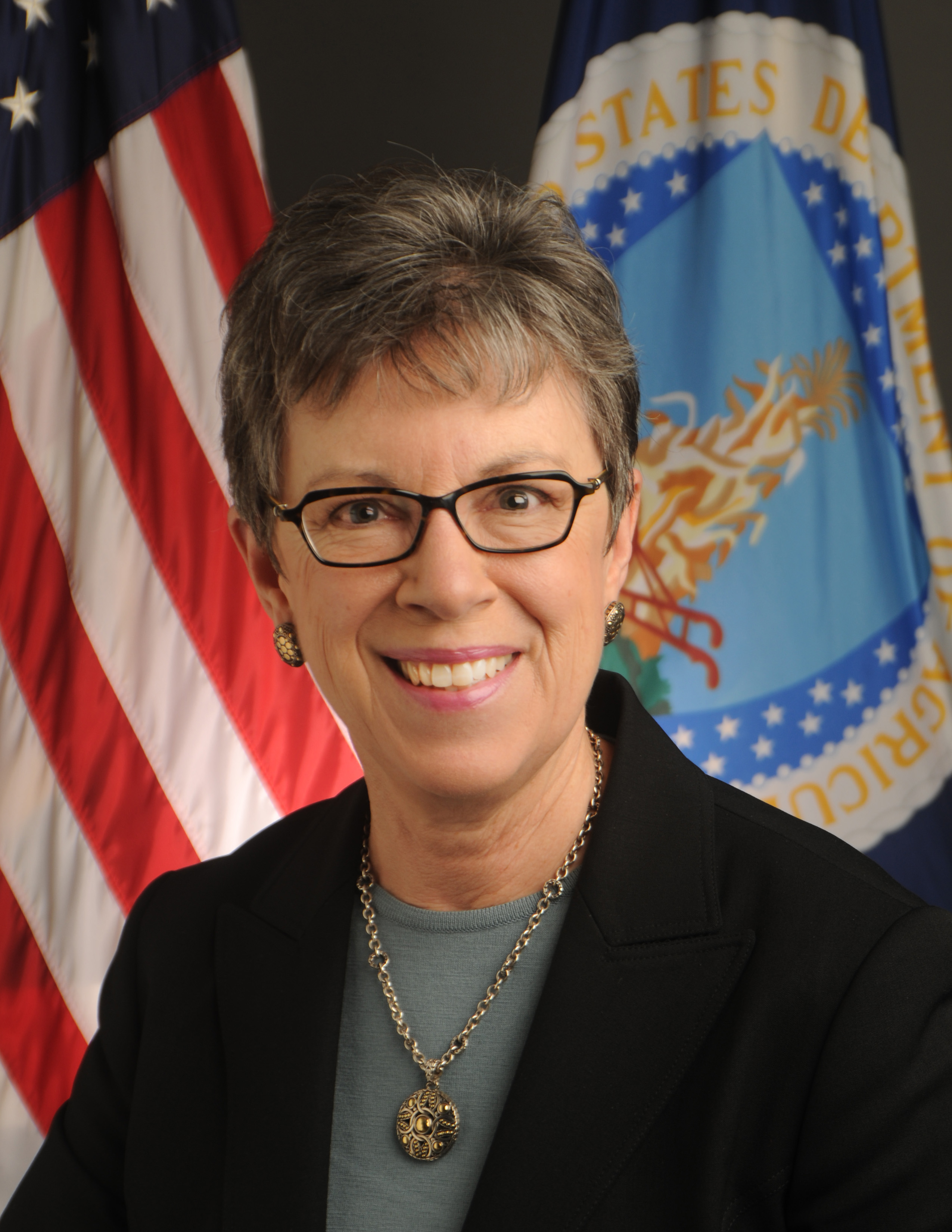

Under Secretary of Agriculture for Research, Education, and Economics
- In office September 16, 2010 – January 20, 2017
- Preceded by: Molly Jahn (acting)
- Succeeded by: Ann M. Bartuska (acting)

Personal details
- Spouse: Tom
- Education: Mary Washington College (B.S.); Virginia Tech (M.S., Ph.D.)
- Profession: Scientist

Catherine E. O'Connor Woteki was the under secretary for United States Department of Agriculture's (USDA) Research, Education, and Economics (REE) mission area, as well as the department's chief scientist. Her responsibilities included oversight of the four agencies that comprise REE, the Agricultural Research Service (ARS), National Institute of Food and Agriculture (NIFA), Economic Research Service (ERS), and National Agricultural Statistics Service (NASS.) The National Agriculture Library and National Arboretum also fall under this mission area. Since 2021, she has been a member of the President’s Council of Advisors on Science and Technology (PCAST).

== Biography ==
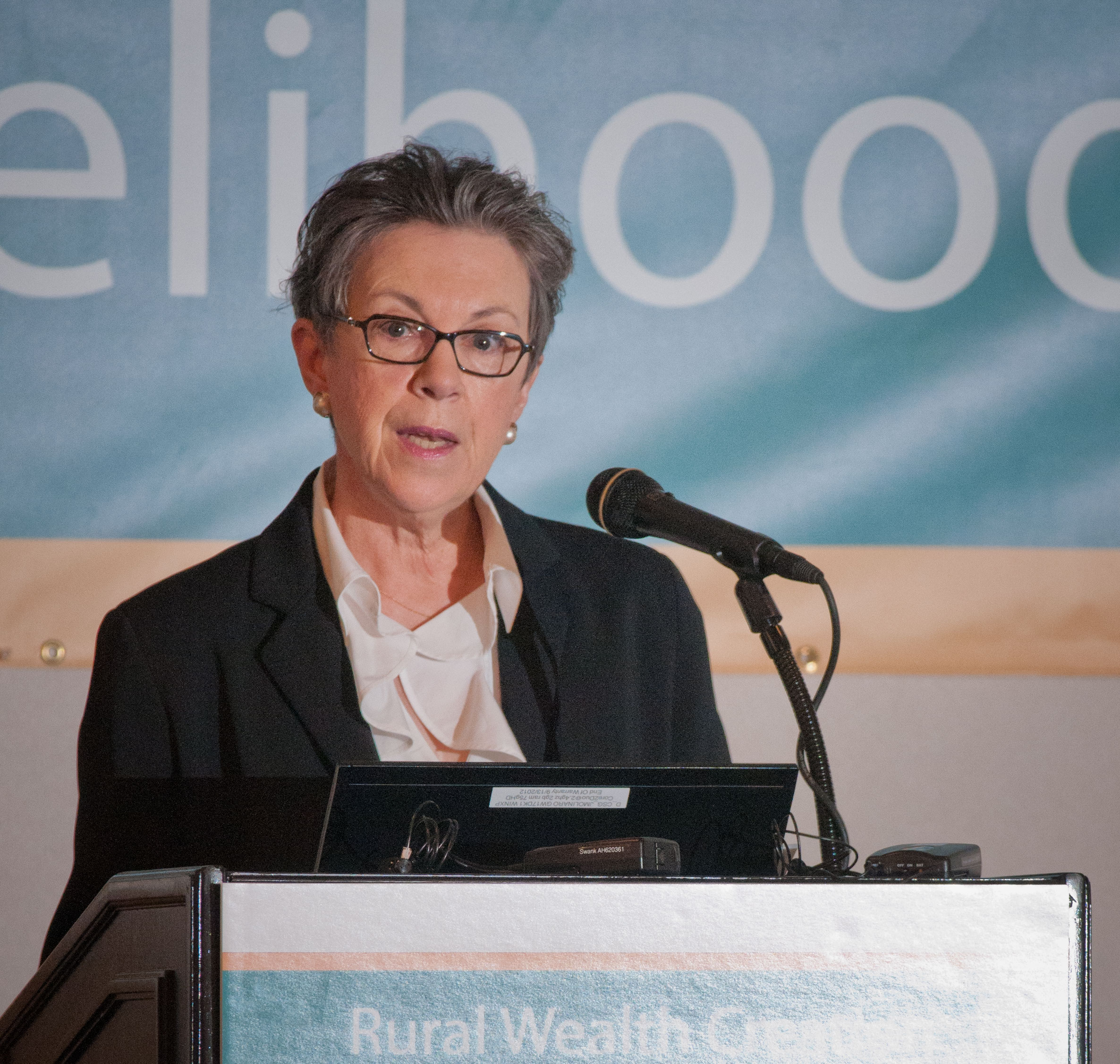
USDA Under Secretary for Research, Education and Economics, Dr. Catherine Woteki at the Rural Wealth Creation and Livelihoods national conference, in Washington DC, 2011

Before joining USDA, Woteki served as global director of scientific affairs for Mars, Incorporated, where she managed the company's scientific policy and research on matters of health, nutrition, and food safety.

From 2002 to 2005, she was dean of agriculture and professor of human nutrition at Iowa State University, where she was also the head of the Agriculture Experiment Station. Woteki served as the first under secretary for food safety at USDA from 1997 to 2001, where she oversaw U.S. Government food safety policy development and USDA's continuity of operations planning. Woteki also served as the deputy under secretary for REE at USDA in 1996.

Prior to going to USDA, she was deputy associate director for science in the White House Office of Science and Technology Policy from 1994 to 1996. During that time she co-authored the Clinton Administration's policy statement, Science in the National Interest. Woteki has also held positions in the National Center for Health Statistics of the U.S. Department of Health and Human Services (1983 to 1990), the Human Nutrition Information Service at USDA (1981 to 1983), and as director of the Food and Nutrition Board of the Institute of Medicine at the National Academy of Sciences (1990 to 1993). During her tenure as director of the Food and Nutrition Board, she had direct responsibility for twenty-seven studies and co-edited a nutrition book entitled Eat for Life, which became a Book of the Month Club selection.

Woteki's research interests include nutrition, food safety policy, risk assessment, and health survey design and analysis. She is the author of over sixty refereed scientific articles and twelve books and technical reports.

In 1999, she was elected to the Institute of Medicine of the National Academy of Sciences, where she has chaired the Food and Nutrition Board (2003 to 2005). She received her M.S. and Ph.D. in human nutrition from Virginia Polytechnic Institute and State University (1974). Woteki received her B.S. in biology and chemistry from Mary Washington College (1969).

Woteki is married to Tom.
