= Under Secretary of Agriculture for Research, Education, and Economics =

The under secretary for research, education, and economics is a high-ranking official within the United States Department of Agriculture that provides leadership and oversight for the Agricultural Research Service, National Institute of Food and Agriculture, Economic Research Service, National Agricultural Library, and National Agricultural Statistics Service.

== Administrative role ==
The research, education, and economics (REE) mission area of the U. S. Department of Agriculture has federal leadership responsibility for advancing scientific knowledge related to agriculture through research, extension, and education.

REE delivers the scientific discovery mission of USDA through:

- The Agricultural Research Service (ARS) is the largest intramural research agency of USDA. ARS has a workforce of around 8,000 employees, including 2,500 life and physical scientists who represent a wide range of disciplines and who work at more than 100 locations across the country and at five overseas laboratories. The ARS research agenda is broad, with about 1,200 research projects organized under 4 major program areas: Nutrition, Food Safety and Food Quality; Animal Production and Protection; Natural Resources and Sustainable Agricultural Systems; and Crop Production and Protection.
- The National Institute of Food and Agriculture (NIFA) is USDA's primary extramural research funding agency. Its mission is to advance knowledge for agriculture, the environment, and human health and wellbeing by funding targeted research, education, and extension projects and programs, some of which are specific to the Land-Grant University System, others open to participation by other partner organizations.
- The Economic Research Service (ERS) is USDA's primary source of economic information and economic and social science research. ERS’ mission is to anticipate economic and policy issues related to food, agriculture, the environment, and rural development, and conduct research that guides public program and policy decisions.
- The National Agricultural Statistics Service (NASS) provides statistics in service to U.S. agriculture. Its reports cover virtually every aspect of U.S. agriculture, including production and supplies of food and fiber, prices paid and received by farmers, farm labor and wages, farm finances, chemical use, and changes in the demographics of U.S. producers.

== Officeholders ==
| No. | Portrait | Name | Office | Took office | Left office | President(s) |
|---|---|---|---|---|---|---|
| 1 | | Karl N. Stauber | Under Secretary of Agriculture for Research, Education, and Economics | May 23, 1995 | | Bill Clinton (1993–2001) |
| 2 | | Joseph Jen | Under Secretary of Agriculture for Research, Education, and Economics | 2001 | 2006 | George W. Bush (2001–2009) |
| 3 | | Gale Buchanan | Under Secretary of Agriculture for Research, Education, and Economics | 2006 | 2009 | George W. Bush (2001–2009) |
| 4 | | Molly Jahn | Acting Under Secretary of Agriculture for Research, Education, and Economics | 2009 | 2010 | Barack Obama (2009–2017) |
| 5 | | Catherine Woteki | Under Secretary of Agriculture for Research, Education, and Economics | September 16, 2010 | January 2017 | Barack Obama (2009–2017) |
| 6 | | Ann Bartuska | Deputy Under Secretary of Agriculture for Research, Education, and Economics | September 2010 | | Barack Obama (2009–2017) |
| 7 | | Sam Clovis | Nominee for Under Secretary of Agriculture for Research, Education, and Economics | July 19, 2017 | November 2, 2017 | Donald Trump (2017–2021) |
| 8 | | Scott Hutchins (politician) | Deputy Under Secretary and Acting Under Secretary of Agriculture for Research, Education, and Economics | November 2019 | 2022 | Donald Trump (2017–2021) |
| 9 | | Chavonda Jacobs Young | Under Secretary of Agriculture for Research, Education, and Economics | June 2022 | January 2025 | Joe Biden (2021–2025) |
| 10 | | Scott Hutchins (politician) | Under Secretary of Agriculture for Research, Education, and Economics | September 18, 2025 | Present | Donald Trump (2025–present) |
