= Population Estimates Program =

U.S. Census Bureau program

The Population Estimates Program (PEP) is a program of the U.S. Census Bureau that publishes annual population estimates and estimates of birth, death, and international migration rates for people in the United States. In addition to publishing those aggregate estimates for the entire country, the program also publishes those yearly estimates by age, sex, race, and Hispanic origin at the national, state, county and city and town level. By doing so, the Population Estimates Program provides up-to-date information on how the size and distribution of the U.S. population has changed each year since the most recent 10-year U.S. census.

The estimates produced by the Population Estimates Program are used in determining how federal funds should be allocated throughout the United States. The annual population estimates are also used as controls for the American Community Survey and the Current Population Survey, which in turn measure diverse demographic data on social, economic and housing characteristics of people in the United States.

The basic procedure the Population Estimates Program uses to measure population is to take the updated population count reported by the last U.S. Census, plus the number of births to U.S. resident women, minus the number of deaths of U.S. residents, plus the net number of international migrants. Estimates for the number of U.S. resident births and deaths are based on data on birth certificates and death certificates provided by the National Center for Health Statistics (NCHS). Estimates for net international migration are based on information from the American Community Survey, NCHS, and the previous census.
