= Farming-dependent county =

Farming-dependent county — The Economic Research Service (ERS) of USDA categorizes non-metropolitan counties by their dominant economic foundation and by characteristic policy type. The 2004 County Typology Codes were developed for all 3,141 counties, county equivalents, and independent cities in the United States. Farming dependent counties (440 total, 403 nonmetro) are those with either 15 percent or more of average annual labor and proprietors' earnings derived from farming during 1998-2000 or 15 percent or more of employed residents worked in farm occupations in 2000.
