= Granville L. Maret =

Civil war captain and justice of the peace

- Born: Granville Love Merritt; December 13, 1822 near Lowell, Garrard County, Kentucky, U.S.
- Died: February 10, 1872 (aged 49); Mount Vernon, Kentucky, U.S.
- Title: Justice of the peace for the fourth district in Whitley County, Kentucky
- Term: ?-1861
- Spouses: Mary Gatliff (m. 1846 - 1849/1850?); Elizabeth Bowman (m. 1861)
- Children: 4

Signature
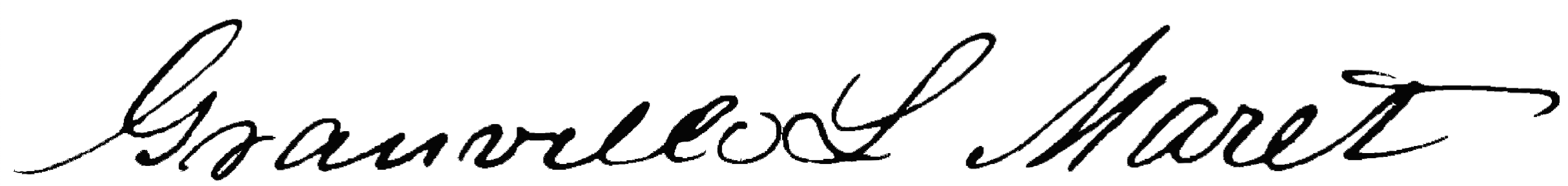

Granville Love Maret (December 13, 1822 - February 10, 1872) was a Union captain during the American Civil War, postmaster, and justice of the peace for the fourth district in Whitley County, Kentucky.

== Early life ==
Granville Love Maret was born Granville Love Merritt on December 13, 1822, near Lowell, Kentucky.

== Before the Civil War ==
On December 24, 1846, Granville married Mary Gatliff in Williamsburg, Kentucky. They had one child, Mollie, in 1849.

In the 1850 United States census, Maret, aged 28 years, was shown to be working as a farmhand in Williamsburg, Kentucky, on the farm of his Father-in-law, Thomas Jefferson Gatliff (1813-1852).

From the late 1850s to either 1860 or 1861, he was a justice of the peace for the fourth district in Whitley County, Kentucky. From January 6, 1860, to February 14, 1860, he was the postmaster for Williamsburg, Kentucky.

== During the Civil War ==
On July 20, 1861, Granville and Elizabeth were wed in Williamsburg, Kentucky, due to her pregnancy. Only 1 month later, on August 20, Maret was among the first to enroll in the American Civil War in Whitley County, Kentucky, along with his brother-in-law, Elias S. Bowman. And after a little over a month, on September 22, 1861, he was mustered in at Camp Dick Robinson to Company G, of the 3rd regiment Kentucky volunteer infantry. But on April 15, 1862, Maret was told that he had been appointed as captain of Company G, of the 3rd regiment, Kentucky volunteer infantry. On the same day, he wrote a letter to adjutant General of the United States, Lorenzo Thomas, which stated:

Camp Cumberlandford, Knox County Ky
April 15th 1862

To the adjutant General of the United States:

Sir, I hereby signify my acceptance of the office of captain of Company (G) of the 3rd Regt. of Kentucky volunteer infantry in the army of the United States. I am aged Thirty-nine years, residence Whitley County state of Kentucky, was elected by the members of Company (G) aforesaid the 20th day of August 1861, and was borned [sic] in the state of Kentucky.

Yours Respectfully,
Granville L. Maret

N. B. My name is spelled Maret.

By October 1862, the 3rd regiment had become the 7th regiment or the "old 3rd". Around January 1863, he was described as being sickly.

== Later life and death ==
Maret spent most of his later years as a farmer on his relatively small farm in Mount Vernon, Kentucky, near to his parents and brother Alva. In the 1869 Rockcastle County tax book, he is listed as owning 10 acres of land, and a few cattle. All being worth $135. In the 1870 agricultural schedule, he had lost an acre, only owning 9 acres of land, with 4 of those being woodland. He owned 1 milk cow. He farmed corn, oats, tobacco, potatoes and more. He made and sold butter and molasses. In 1870, his entire farm was valued at an estimated $229.

Granville L. Maret died on February 10, 1872, on his farm in Mount Vernon, Kentucky.
