= World Programme for the Census of Agriculture =

The World Programme for the Census of Agriculture (WCA) is an international programme led by the Food and Agriculture Organization of the United Nations (FAO) that supports the implementation of national censuses of agriculture on a 10-year basis through the use of standard concepts, definitions and methodology. The WCA was developed in the years 1929–1930 by the International Institute of Agriculture (IIA). Governments from many countries agreed to promote a coordinated implementation of censuses of agriculture around the world on a basis as uniform as possible. The WCA 1929–1930 constituted the first world census of agriculture round and was implemented in about 60 countries. The subsequent 1940 round could not be completed due to the onset of World War II. Following the dissolution of the IIA in 1946, the Food and Agriculture Organization of the United Nations (FAO) took over the programme and launched in 1948 the WCA 1950 as well as the successive decennial programmes. Seven decennial rounds – in 1950, 1960, 1970, 1980, 1990, 2000, 2010 and 2020 – have been promoted by FAO. The current WCA 2020 is the tenth decennial international census of agriculture round and covers the censuses of agriculture to be carried out by countries between 2016 and 2025.

In each decennial WCA, FAO supports member countries to carry out their national censuses of agriculture through the development and dissemination of up-to-date international standards, concepts, definitions and methodologies as well as technical assistance. Technical assistance involves capacity building in planning, designing and implementing censuses of agriculture.

== Historical evolution of the WCA ==
In the first two WCA rounds, 1930 and 1940, the IIA recommended a “standard form” for use by all countries referring to the same census period. At that time, there was a large gap in agricultural information. However, many countries found it difficult to conduct the census using a long questionnaire given the limited human and technological resources. Each subsequent programme was enriched with the experience of previous programmes from both the methodological and operational points of view.

The WCA 1950, the first programme developed by FAO, brought forward the idea of collecting data on the structural characteristics of agriculture as the primary purpose of the census. This focus on the structural characteristics of agriculture still holds. The WCA 1950 recommended a short list of essential census items and an extended list with items of secondary importance. The 1950 programme also gave increased attention to the definitions of census items and the tabulation of internationally comparable results.

The WCA 1960 accomplished a quantum jump in census methodology as it introduced the use of sampling methods in census, including post-enumeration surveys (PES). The option to use sampling methods increased the number of countries participating in the census of agriculture. The programme arranged the census items into ten sections according to the subject matter. It also raised the relationship between the agricultural and the population censuses for the first time.

The WCA 1970 discussed the role of the census of agriculture in the overall system of agricultural statistics, in terms of frame for sample surveys, benchmark for current agricultural statistics and capacity development for organizing subsequent agricultural surveys. The programme discussed the use of sampling in pilot censuses and pre-testing surveys, in PES, in quality checks during data processing, in tabulation of results, etc. The WCA 1970 introduced an entirely new section dealing with the association of agricultural holdings with other industries.

The WCA 1980 brought about several recommendations. First, that the census of agriculture should be the basis for the collection of current agricultural data through improved methods. Second, that the census should be utilized for the development and improvement of an overall programme of food and agricultural statistics. Third, that concepts, definitions and methods should be harmonized with other related statistical systems and operations to ensure comparability and compatibility. Fourth, that more elaborate tabulations should be produced, helped by advances in electronic data processing. Fifth, each country should have greater flexibility and more freedom in adapting the programme. For the first time, a special chapter was dedicated to practical guidelines on the preparation and organization of a census of agriculture. The WCA 1980 was the first to indicate explicitly that it referred to national censuses conducted within the decade (1976–1985) centred on the reference year of the round (1980). Additional supplementary guidelines on taking censuses of agriculture were published later to provide practical information on the steps involved in actually conducting a census of agriculture.

The WCA 1990 encouraged countries to develop and implement the census of agriculture according to their national economic and statistical capabilities and requirements. The programme made further efforts in harmonizing concepts, definitions and classifications with those used in other data sources. It did not recommend the inclusion of production and input quantities in the census scope. It recommended extensive cross-tabulations to ensure the maximum use of the census data. The WCA 1990 encouraged a complementary relationship between the census of agriculture and more frequent food and agricultural sample surveys as well as with related non-censuses of agriculture and surveys. Separate guidelines on micro-computer-based data processing (SDS 2a) were published later.

The WCA 2000 stressed that economic units engaged solely in (a) hunting, trapping and game propagation; (b) forestry and logging; (c) fishing; or (d) agricultural services, were not considered as agricultural holdings and, therefore, considered outside the scope of the census. It recommended that the activities covered by the census of agriculture were included in the International Standard Industrial Classification of All Economic Activities, third edition, ISIC groups 011 (crops), 012 (animals) and 013 (crops and animals). The programme also introduced the issue of the role of women in agriculture and the presentation of census results disaggregated by sex. Another innovation was the option to include aquaculture holdings (introduced in supplementary guidelines, SDS 5b) and the marking of some items as having environmental implications. Two additional supplementary guidelines were published later. One on employment (SDS 5a) to improve concepts, definitions and standards used to collect employment information in censuses of agriculture. Another one (SDS 6) on conducting censuses of agriculture and surveys to provide more practical information on the steps involved in actually implementing a census of agriculture.

The WCA 2010 programme introduced the modular approach. This approach consisted of a core module carried out on a complete enumeration basis to provide key structural data, in conjunction with one or more sample-based census supplementary modules to provide more in-depth data. The census items denoted as “essential” in earlier programmes were designated as core module items and complemented by items in the supplementary modules. The WCA 2010 also introduced the concept of aquacultural unit (for countries wishing to include an aquacultural supplementary module) and the option to conduct an aquacultural census in conjunction with the census of agriculture. Two new concepts – the sub-holding and the sub-holder – were introduced to measure the role of household members in the management of the holding, especially women. The programme introduced a community survey to be conducted in parallel with the census and for obtaining data on common infrastructure issues affecting farmers. Finally, the WCA 2010 gave emphasis to integrating and coordinating the agricultural and population censuses. This recommendation was underpin with the publication of supplementary guidelines for linking population and housing censuses with censuses of agriculture.

The WCA 2020 programme featured the discussion of four methodological modalities for conducting a census of agriculture: the classical (one-off) approach; the modular approach, which was introduced in the WCA 2010; the integrated census/survey modality, involving rotating survey modules over the inter-census years; and the combined census modality, which uses administrative data. The programme made a clear distinction between ‘essential’ items and ‘frame’ items. In addition, other items, referred to as ‘additional’ items, were presented as optional. The WCA 2020 improved the approach for assessing the distribution of managerial decisions in the holding, useful for the collection of sex-disaggregated data. The programme included two new optional themes: “Fisheries” (capture fisheries activities conducted at household level) and “Environment/Green House Gases (GHG)” (basic agro-environmental data on GHG and ammonia emissions). Two more features of the WCA 2020 was, first, an increased emphasis on the use of information technology in data collection, processing and dissemination (e.g. CAPI, CAWI, the use of interactive online outputs and access to anonymised micro-data). Another feature was recommendations to ensure cost-effectiveness of the census of agriculture. The WCA 2020 was complemented by Operational guidelines, which provided practical guidance on the main stages involved in the preparation and implementation of the census of agriculture.

== Country participation and documentation by WCA round ==
A repository of documents and metadata for censuses of agriculture undertaken since the WCA 1980 is available here. The repository includes a short country profile of the methodology, coverage and main results, while a global review of agricultural censuses was published in early 2021.

For the current decennial census round that ends in 2025, the WCA 2020, preliminary information is available here. In early 2020, the Food and Agricultural Organization of the United Nations (FAO) conducted a mid-term review of the plans and progress of national censuses of agriculture in the 2020 round.

== Database on agricultural census data ==
In 2022, FAO endowed FAOSTAT, the world's largest agricultural database, with a new domain that enables much easier comparison and assessment of trends over time of the agricultural structures of countries.

== Census of agriculture microdata ==
Starting with the WCA 2010 round (2005–2015), some countries provided access to anonymized census microdata (e.g. Armenia Australia, Bolivia, Brazil, Chile, Colombia, Cook Islands, Estonia, France, Indonesia, Italy, Rep. of Korea, Lao DPR, Nepal, Namibia, the Netherlands, Mexico, Nicaragua, Peru, Poland, Portugal, the Philippines, Serbia, Slovenia, Sweden, Tanzania, Uruguay, USA and Viet Nam). The Food and Agriculture Microdata (FAM) Catalogue had links to ten census datasets available in countries’ websites as of March 2020.

== The impact of COVID-19 on the implementation of WCA 2020 ==
The pandemic affected planning and implementation of censuses of agriculture under the WCA 2020 round in both developed and developing countries. The extent of the impact varied according to the stages at which the censuses were, ranging from planning (i.e. staffing, procurement, preparation of frames, questionnaires), fieldwork (field training and enumeration) or data processing/analysis stages.

The census of agriculture's reference period is the agricultural year. Thus, countries carefully schedule census activities to ensure that crop and livestock data are collected at the right time. In some countries, lockdown measures resulted in a full year postponement of the census data collection as the agricultural season was missed. Some papers discussed the impact of COVID-19 on national censuses of agriculture.

== See also ==
- List of national and international statistical services
- Intercensal estimate
- Census
- Census of agriculture

== Sources ==
This article incorporates text from a free content work. Licensed under CC BY-SA 3.0 IGO (license statement/permission). Text taken from World Programme for the Census of Agriculture 2020 Volume 1 – Programme, concepts and definitions, FAO, FAO.

This article incorporates text from a free content work. Licensed under CC BY-SA 3.0 IGO (license statement/permission). Text taken from 2000 World Census of Agriculture – Methodological Review, FAO, FAO.

This article incorporates text from a free content work. Licensed under CC BY-SA 3.0 IGO (license statement/permission). Text taken from World Programme for the Census of Agriculture 2020, Volume 2 – Operational guidelines, FAO, FAO.

This article incorporates text from a free content work. Licensed under CC BY-SA 3.0 IGO (license statement/permission). Text taken from Main results and metadata by country (2006–2015). World Programme for the Census of Agriculture 2010, FAO, FAO.

This article incorporates text from a free content work. Licensed under CC BY-SA 3.0 IGO (license statement/permission). Text taken from National agricultural census operations and COVID-19, FAO, FAO.

This article incorporates text from a free content work. Licensed under CC BY-SA 3.0 IGO (license statement/permission). Text taken from Impact of COVID-19 on national censuses of agriculture (Status overview) (2020), FAO, FAO.
