= Ann Bartuska =

American ecologist and biologist (born 1953)

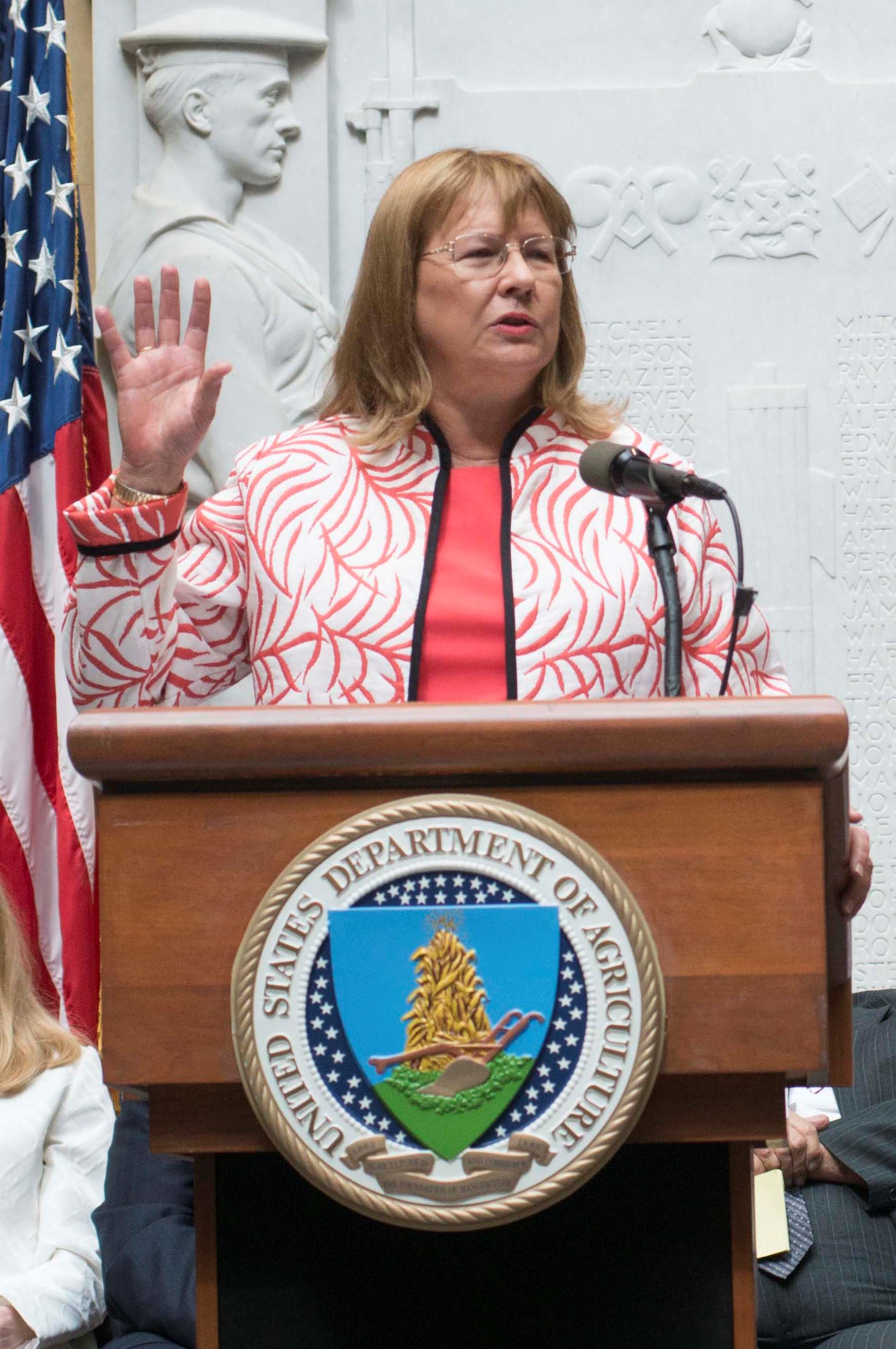
- Bartuska at the Feds Feed Families 2015
- Born: August 6, 1953 (age 73); Philadelphia, Pennsylvania
- Education: Wilkes University; Ohio University; West Virginia University
- Occupations: Ecologist; biologist
- Years active: 1981–present

Ann M. Bartuska (born August 6, 1953) is an ecologist and biologist. She is a senior advisor at Resources for the Future and a former Deputy Under Secretary for Research, Education, and Economics (REE) at the United States Department of Agriculture and former USDA Chief Scientist.

== Education ==
Bartuska graduated from Wilkes University in 1975 with a bachelor's degree in biology. She went on to earn a master's degree in botany and ecology from Ohio University in 1977, and a doctorate in biogeochemistry and ecosystem ecology from West Virginia University in 1981. Her dissertation, titled Detrital processes in a black locust reforested surface mine compared to a sugar maple dominated mixed hardwood stand, was completed under adviser, Dr. Gerald E. Lang. Her research has focused on ecosystems processes in landscapes disturbed by coal mining. She is married to Dr. Mark R. Walbridge, Chair of the Department of Biology at West Virginia University.

== Career ==
From 1982 until 1989, Bartuska managed research, development, and assessment programs associated with the effects of acid rain and air pollution, first for North Carolina State University and then under the United States Forest Service. Both projects fell under the National Acid Precipitation Assessment Program. In 1989 she was named Assistant Station Director for Continuing Research at the Southeastern Forest Experiment Station; while there, she was responsible for research in both Florida and Georgia. She later joined the staff of Forest Environment Research at the Forest Service's Washington Office in 1991 as a Wetlands Specialist with the responsibility of developing a National Wetlands Research Program. In 1992, when the Ecosystem Management staff was created, she was named the first head. Bartuska spent a year in 1993 as the Forest Service Liaison to the National Biological Survey of the U.S. Department of Interior and in October 1994 became director of Forest Health Protection for the Forest Service.

In January 1999, Bartuska was named Director of Forest Management, of which she was the first woman and first ecologist to hold the position. She continued on as director, when Forest Management and Range Management were merged. Bartuska left the Forest Service in 2001 to become the executive director of The Nature Conservancy's Invasive Species Initiative, and she remained there until 2004. She returned to the Forest Service as Deputy Chief for Research and Development in 2004 and from January to October 2009 served as acting Deputy Undersecretary for Natural Resources and Environment. In 2010 she joined the USDA's Research, Education, and Economics (REE) mission area, where she was Deputy Under Secretary. Her responsibilities included oversight over four agencies which support the REE mission: Agricultural Research Service (ARS - which includes the National Agricultural Library and National Arboretum), National Institute of Food and Agriculture (NIFA), Economic Research Service (ERS), and National Agricultural Statistics Service (NASS).

Ann Bartuska was named chair of the Subcommittee on Global Change Research (SGCR) by Dr. Tamara Dickinson, Principal Assistant Director for Environment and Energy at the White House Office of Science and Technology Policy in 2016, of which she previously served as vice-chair. The group was created and is responsible for, meeting the requirement of the Global Change Research Act of 1990. In 2017, Bartuska joined the non-profit, Resources for the Future (RFF), as vice president of the newly formed program on Land, Water, and Nature. She currently serves as a senior adviser to RFF, focused on natural resources and forestry with special consideration of natural climate solutions through forest and agricultural lands.

== Memberships and legacy ==
Bartuska was vice president for public affairs at the Ecological Society of America from 1996 to 1999 and president of the society from 2003–2004. She was a co-chair of the Science and Technology for Sustainability Roundtable of the National Academies, served on the Board of the Council of Science Society Presidents, and is a member of the American Association for the Advancement of Science(AAAS) and Society for the Advancement of Chicanos and Native American in Science (SACNAS). Bartuska has also served on the advisory board of the National Science Foundation and on the External Advisory Board for the Cornell Atkinson Center for Sustainability. She served as co-chair of the Ecological Systems subcommittee of the Committee on Environment, Natural Resources, and Sustainability of the White House National Science and Technology Council. She was also a part of the Sustainability Roundtable of the National Academy of Sciences. She was one of the inaugural Fellows of the Ecological Society of America, elected in 2012.

== Publications ==
- "Elemental concentrations in plant tissues as influenced by low pH soils" by Plant and Soil, 1980
- "The Report of the Ecological Society of America Committee on the Scientific Basis for Ecosystem Management" from Ecological Applications from the Ecological Society of America, 1996
- "Ecosystem management to achieve ecological sustainability: The case of South Florida" from Environmental Management, 1996
- "Cross-Boundary Issues to Manage for Healthy Forest Ecosystems" from the book, Landscape Ecological Analysis, 1999, p. 24-34
- "Towards a shared vision" from Frontiers in Ecology and the Environment, 2004
- "Science Priorities for Reducing the Threat of Invasive Species to Sustainable Forestry" from BioScience, 2005
- Why Biomass is Important - The Role of the USDA Forest Service in Managing the Using Biomass for Energy and Other Uses from the U.S. Forest Service, 2006
- "Restoring Justice/Restoring Ecosystems: The Intersection of Ecology and Environmental Justice" from Bulletin of the Ecological Society of American, 2007
- "The role of federal agencies in the application of scientific knowledge" from Frontiers in Ecology and the Environment, 2010
- "USDA Forest Service research and development - caring for the land and serving people" from Folia Forestalia Polonica, 2011
- "When peer-reviewed publications are not enough! Delivering science for natural resource management" (Reprint - original from 2012) from Forest Policy and Economics, 2013
- "Nature as capital: Advancing and incorporating ecosystem services in United States federal policies and programs" from Proceedings of the National Academy of Sciences of the United States of America, 2015
- "The IPBES Conceptual Framework - connecting nature and People" from Current Opinion in Environmental Sustainability, 2015
- "Beyond desertification" from Frontiers in Ecology and Environment, 2015
