= Agriculture Innovation Center =

The 2002 farm bill (P.L. 107-171, Sec. 6402) directed the USDA to provide grants and to assist in the establishment of Agriculture Innovation Centers that provide information, training and direct assistance to agricultural producers in the production, processing, development and marketing of value-added agricultural commodities and products. In September 2003, the USDA announced $10 million in grants for the establishment of demonstration centers in Indiana, Iowa, Kansas, Michigan, Minnesota, Montana, New Jersey, New York, North Dakota, and Pennsylvania.

== See also ==
- Electrical energy efficiency on United States farms
- National Institute of Food and Agriculture
