= Census of agriculture =

Processing data on agriculture

Countries that conducted an agricultural census during the WCA 2010 round (2006–2015)

A census of agriculture is a statistical operation for collecting, processing and disseminating data on the structure of agriculture, covering the whole or a significant part of a country. Typical structural data collected in a census of agriculture are number and size of holdings, land tenure, land use, crop area, irrigation, livestock numbers, gender of holders, number of household members, labour and other agricultural inputs. In a census of agriculture, data are collected at the holding level, but some community-level data may also be collected.

The most widely accepted definition of the census of agriculture is that provided by the World Programme for the Census of Agriculture (WCA), particularly in its guidelines that are updated every ten years.

In practice, countries adapt this definition to their national circumstances and needs. Some examples are available here. Eurostat, the statistical office of the European Union provides a common definition for all its member countries.

== Objectives of the census of agriculture ==
The census of agriculture aims to provide data on the structure of agricultural holdings, with attention given to providing data for small administrative units. Censuses of agriculture are also used to provide benchmarks to improve current crop and livestock statistics and to provide sampling frames for follow-up agricultural sample surveys.

The general objectives of the census of agriculture are:

1. To provide data on the structure of agriculture, especially for small administrative units, and to enable detailed cross-tabulations;
2. To provide data to use as benchmarks for and reconciliation of current agricultural statistics;
3. To provide frames for agricultural sample surveys.

In practice, countries expand these objectives or add specific objectives to serve their needs.

Since censuses of agriculture are usually undertaken only every ten years, it is natural to associate them with those aspects of agriculture that change relatively slowly over time. Some national censuses of agriculture, however, are conducted at five-year intervals (e.g. Australia, Canada, India, Japan, New Zealand, Republic of Korea, USA and Vietnam), which can provide more up-to-date structural data for agricultural policy purposes. Thus, censuses of agriculture are mainly concerned with data on the basic organizational structure of agricultural holdings (see structural data in the definition above). Censuses of agriculture do not normally include data that change from year to year, such as agricultural production or prices. The latter type of fast-changing information is usually collected in sample surveys.

In terms of international comparability, some cross-country analytical studies on agricultural sectors have been carried out using census data.

== Statistical unit of the census of agriculture ==
The statistical unit for the census of agriculture is the agricultural holding. In developed countries the statistical units are often establishments with sales or operations above a certain level. Eurostat provides a common definition of the statistical unit for all European Union member countries.

=== Definition of agricultural holding ===
The most widely accepted definition of an agricultural holding is:

"An agricultural holding is an economic unit of agricultural production under single management comprising all livestock kept and all land used wholly or partly for agricultural production purposes, without regard to title, legal form or size. Single management may be exercised by an individual or household, jointly by two or more individuals or households, by a clan or tribe, or by a juridical person such as a corporation, cooperative or government agency. The holding's land may consist of one or more parcels, located in one or more separate areas or in one or more territorial or administrative divisions, providing the parcels share the same production means, such as labour, farm buildings, machinery or draught animals."

Eurostat, the statistical office of the European Union, provides a similar definition for all its member countries:

"An agricultural holding, or holding or farm is a single unit, both technically and economically, operating under a single management and which undertakes economic activities in agriculture within the economic territory of the European Union, either as its primary or secondary activity. The holding may also provide other supplementary (non-agricultural) products and services."

There are two types of agricultural holding:

1. holdings in the household sector – that is, those operated by household members; and
2. holdings in the non-household sector, such as corporations and government institutions.

In most developing countries, the majority of agricultural production is in the household sector. The concept of "agricultural holding" in those countries is often closely related to the concept of "household".

== Scope of the census of agriculture ==
A census of agriculture aims to measure the structure of the agricultural production industry. The scope of the agricultural production industry broadly covers not only crop and livestock production activities, but also forestry and fisheries production activities, as well as other food- and agriculture-related activities. The World Programme for the Census of Agriculture (WCA) recommends that the census of agriculture focus only on those units engaged in the production of crop and livestock products, including aquaculture. Units engaged in forestry and fisheries are not covered unless they also had some crop or livestock production activities. Usually, separate data collection operations are organized to cover forestry and fisheries.

The scope of a census of agriculture may be defined under ISIC (Rev.4) as follows:

- Group 011: Growing of non-perennial crops
- Group 012: Growing of perennial crops
- Group 013: Plant propagation
- Group 014: Animal production
- Group 015: Mixed farming

However, country practices show that the scope varies according to the objectives set for the census. Some countries such as Argentina, Colombia, Chile, Brazil, Japan, Korea and New Zealand include forestry within the scope of their census of agriculture. Other countries such as Colombia, Brazil, Republic of Korea, the Philippines and Thailand include fisheries.

== Coverage of the census of agriculture ==
Ideally, a census of agriculture should cover agricultural activity across the whole country. However, for operational reasons, sometimes countries omit certain areas of the country, such as urban areas, remote areas with marginal levels of agriculture or areas with security problems. Country practices on coverage in national censuses of agriculture can be found here.

== Census of agriculture's reference period ==
The census has two main reference periods, namely, the census reference year and the census reference day:

- The census reference year is a period of twelve months, usually either a calendar year or an agricultural year, generally encompassing the various time reference dates or periods of data collection for individual census items. Use of the agricultural year has the advantage that respondents often think of their activities in seasonal terms and thus find recall easier for this reference period. In practice, "the last 12 months" is commonly used instead of a fixed census reference year.
- The census reference day is a point in time used for inventory items such as livestock numbers and machinery. In practice, many countries use "day of enumeration" instead of a fixed census reference day to facilitate the enumeration.

Country practices on the use of census of agriculture's reference periods can be found here.

== Timing of the census of agriculture ==
The World Programme for the Census of Agriculture (WCA) encourages countries to carry out their decennial census of agriculture as close as possible to the year ending in "0", to help make international comparisons more meaningful. The WCA also encourages countries to take into consideration the timing implications imposed by the population and housing census to ensure a good coordination of the two censuses.

There are many advantages to conducting the census of agriculture soon after the population and housing census, especially as agriculture-related data and field materials will still be current. If the population and housing census is being used to develop a frame, i.e. the list of households engaged in own-account agricultural activities, the need to conduct the census of agriculture soon after the population and housing census becomes more critical, to ensure the frame remains as up-to-date as possible.

== History ==
The first censuses of agriculture were carried out in Norway (1835), USA (1840), Belgium (1846), Uruguay (1852), the UK (1866), Argentina (1888), Hungary (1895), Canada (1896) and Bulgaria (1897). Following the establishment of the International Institute of Agriculture (IIA) in Rome in 1905, governments from many countries agreed to promote the coordinated implementation of censuses of agriculture around the world on a basis as uniform as possible. The first Programme for the World Census of Agriculture (WCA) was developed for the years 1929-1930 and implemented in about 60 countries. The 1940 round could not be completed due to the onset of World War II. Following its creation in 1945, the Food and Agriculture Organization of the United Nations (FAO) succeeded the IIA and took over the task of organizing the World Programme for the Census of Agriculture (WCA) starting from the 1950 round and continued with successive decennial Programmes. The current WCA 2020 is the tenth decennial international Census of Agriculture Programme and covers the period 2016–2025.

== The World Programme for the Census of Agriculture (WCA) ==
In the 1920s, governments from many countries agreed to promote a coordinated implementation of censuses of agriculture around the world on a uniform basis. The International Institute of Agriculture (IIA) developed the World Programme for the Census of Agriculture (WCA) for the years 1929-1930 and 1940. The IIA recommended the use of a "standard form" by all countries referring to the same census period. The 1929-1930 constituted the first world census of agriculture round and was implemented in about 60 countries. The 1940 census round was interrupted by the onset of World War II. After World War II and following the dissolution of the IIA in 1946, the Food and Agriculture Organization of the United Nations (FAO) took over the programme and launched in 1948 the WCA 1950 as well as the successive decennial programmes. Seven decennial rounds – in 1950, 1960, 1970, 1980, 1990, 2000, 2010 and 2020 – have been promoted by FAO. In each decennial WCA, FAO supports member countries to carry out their national agricultural censuses through the development and dissemination of methodological and practical guidelines, and technical assistance.

== Cost-effectiveness of the census of agriculture ==
The census of agriculture is one of the largest and most costly national statistical operations and takes several years to implement from planning to dissemination of results. The census should be planned and carried out as inexpensively as possible without compromising the objectives and quality of the data. Some publications discuss approaches conducive to improving the cost efficiency of the census of agriculture while ensuring data quality, and present some country experiences.

== The impact of COVID-19 on the implementation of national censuses of agriculture ==
The pandemic affected the planning and implementation of censuses of agriculture in the current 2020 census round in all world's regions. The extent of the impact varied according to the stages at which the censuses were, ranging from planning (i.e. staffing, procurement, preparation of frames, questionnaires), fieldwork (field training and enumeration) or data processing/analysis stages.

The census of agriculture's reference period is the agricultural year. Thus, countries carefully schedule census activities to ensure that crop and livestock data are collected at the right time. A delay in census activities may be critical and can result in a full year postponement of the enumeration if the agricultural season is missed. Some publications discussed the impact of COVID-19 on national censuses of agriculture.

== Censuses of agriculture by country ==
After each decennial census round, FAO publishes the profiles of each census of agriculture, including main results and metadata. A summary of the historical outline of the countries and territories that conduct censuses of agriculture is provided below.

=== Africa ===
==== Angola ====
Angola conducted its first Agricultural and Fisheries Census (AFC) in 2019-2020. The AFC was the country's first census since its independence in 1975. However, only the core module was conducted while the supplementary modules are awaiting funding.

Benin

The last census of agriculture was conducted in 2019/2020.

==== Botswana ====
The first livestock census was carried out in 1971, while three censuses of agriculture, covering both crops and livestock, were conducted in 1982, 1993, 2004 and 2015.

==== Burkina Faso ====
The Census of Agriculture 2006–2010 of Burkina Faso was the first census of agriculture ever undertaken in the country. The country conducted a population and housing census in 2019 with an agricultural module.

==== Cabo Verde ====
Censuses of agriculture were carried out in 1963, 1978, 1988, 2004 and 2015.

Cameroon

The country conducted its last census of agriculture in 1984.

Comoros

The country conducted its last census of agriculture in 2004.

==== The Congo ====
The Congo conducted its first census of agriculture in 1985–1986. The second General Agricultural Census (GAC) in the Congo was carried out in 2014–2015.

==== Côte d'Ivoire ====
The 2015/2016 Census of Agricultural Holders and Holdings (REEA), was the third census of agriculture carried out in the Côte d'Ivoire (only the core module). The previous censuses were conducted in 1974 and 2001.

Democratic Republic of the Congo

The country conducted its last census of agriculture in 1990.

==== Egypt ====
Egypt has conducted eight national censuses of agriculture, all by complete enumeration, in the years 1929, 1939, 1950, 1961, 1982, 1990, 2000 and 2009/2010.

==== Equatorial Guinea ====
The first General Census of Agriculture (GCA) in Equatorial Guinea was carried out in 2015, along with the fourth Population and Housing Census (PHC) and the first Labour Force, Training and Employment Survey (LFTES). However, the GCA results were not published.

==== Eswatini ====
The first census of agriculture in the Kingdom of Eswatini was conducted in 1971/1972, followed by censuses of agriculture carried out in 1983/1984, in 1992/1993, 2002/2003 and in 2012/2013.

Ethiopia

The country conducted a sample-based census of agriculture in 2001/2002.

Gabon

The country conducted its last census of agriculture in 1981-1982.

==== The Gambia ====
The 2011/2012 census of agriculture was the second comprehensive census of agriculture conducted in the Gambia. The first one was undertaken in 2001/2002.

Ghana

The Ghana Statistical Service (GSS) and the Ministry of Food and Agriculture (MOFA) conducted the last Ghana Census of Agriculture (GCA) in 2018. The previous one had been in 1984.

==== Lesotho ====
Lesotho has been conducting decennial censuses of agriculture since 1949. The censuses of agriculture 1949/1950 and 1959/1960 were both organized by the Ministry of Agriculture, while the censuses of agriculture for 1969/1970, 1979/1980, 1989/1990, 1999/2000, 2009/2010 and the latest, census of agriculture 2020/2021, were organized by the Bureau of Statistics (BOS).

==== Malawi ====
The Census of Agriculture 2006/2007 was the fourth census of agriculture conducted in Malawi. The first one was conducted in 1968/1969, the second in 1980/1981 and the third in 1991/1992.

Mali

The country conducted its last census of agriculture in 2005.

Madagascar

The country conducted its last census of agriculture in 2004.

==== Mauritius ====
The first census of agriculture was carried out in the Republic of Mauritius in 1930 and the second one in 1940. The census of agriculture 2014 was the first one to be carried out after more than 70 years.

Mauritania

The country conducted its last census of agriculture in 1984-1985.

Mayotte

This French overseas territory conducted its last census of agriculture in 2020.

Morocco

The country conducted its last census of agriculture in 2016 (only the core module), but the census results were not published.

==== Mozambique ====
The first census of agriculture during the colonial period was conducted in 1951, followed by a second one in 1961, and a third census of agriculture in 1999/2000 (this was the first census of agriculture in the post-independence period). The census of agriculture 2009/2010 was the fourth census of agriculture carried out in the Republic of Mozambique.

==== Namibia ====
The Census of Agriculture 1994/1995 was the first one undertaken since the independence of Namibia. It was followed by the census of agriculture 2004/2005 and the one in 2013/2014.

==== Niger ====
The last census of agriculture in Niger was conducted in 2004–2008. Previous censuses of agriculture were conducted in 1970 and 1980.

==== Reunion ====
The last census of agriculture in the French territory of Reunion was conducted in 2020. Previous censuses of agriculture were conducted in 1970, 1979, 1988, 2000 and 2010.

==== Senegal ====
The first census of agriculture was conducted in the Republic of Senegal in 1998/1999. In 2013, the country carried out the fourth General Census of Population and Housing (GCPH), combined with the second census of agriculture called General Census of Population and Housing, Agriculture and Livestock (RGPHAE) 2013.

==== Seychelles ====
Censuses of agriculture in Seychelles were conducted in 1950 and 1961. Agriculture modules were included in the Censuses of Population and Housing (CPH) conducted in 1971, 1977, 1987, 1994, 2002 and 2010. The last census of agriculture, was conducted in 2011.

==== South Africa ====
South Africa has conducted censuses of agriculture since 1918. The last Censuses of Commercial Agriculture (CoCAs) were conducted in 2002, 2007 and 2017.

==== Tanzania ====
The first census of agriculture was conducted in 1971/1972, the second in 1994/1995, the third in 2002/2003, and the fourth in 2007/2008 since the country independence. Tanzania conducted its fifth National Sample Census of Agriculture (NSCA) in 2020.

==== Togo ====
The first census of agriculture was carried out in 1972, the second in 1982, the third in 1996, and the fourth one in 2012–2014.

Tunisia

The country conducted its last census of agriculture in 2004.

==== Uganda ====
The first census of agriculture in Uganda was undertaken in 1963/1965, the second in 1990/1991, and the third in 2008/2009. Agriculture modules were included in the Population and Housing Censuses (PHCs) conducted in 2002 and 2014. Uganda also conducted a National Livestock Census (NLC) in 2008. In 2008/2009 Uganda conducted its last Census of Agriculture (UCA).

=== The Americas ===
==== Antigua and Barbuda ====
The 2007 Census of Agriculture was the third census of agriculture carried out in Antigua and Barbuda. Previous censuses of agriculture were conducted in 1961 and 1984.

==== Argentina ====
The first census of agriculture in Argentina was conducted in 1888. Subsequently, eleven censuses were carried out in 1895, 1908, 1914, 1937, 1947, 1952, 1960, 1969, 1988, 2002, 2008 and 2018.

==== Belize ====
The first census of agriculture of Belize was conducted in the frame of the 1970 World Programme for the Census of Agriculture round- (WCA 1970), followed by others in 1984/1985, 2011 and 2018/2019. The report of the 2018/2019 census was not published.

==== Bolivia ====
The first Census of Agriculture was conducted in 1950 and the second in 1984. The 2013 Census of Agriculture was the third census to be conducted in the Plurinational State of Bolivia.

==== Brazil ====
The first census of agriculture in Brazil was conducted in 1920. Since 1940, censuses of agriculture have been conducted on a decennial basis until 1970, and quinquennially thereafter, until 1985. The following agricultural censuses were in 1996, 2006 and 2017.

==== Canada ====
Starting in 1896, a separate census of agriculture was taken every five years in Manitoba and, beginning in 1906, in Alberta and Saskatchewan. Since 1956, the five-year census of agriculture was extended to the entire country, and conducted in conjunction with the Census of Population. The last census of agriculture was conducted in 2021.

==== Chile ====
The first census of agriculture in Chile was conducted in 1930. Since 1936, censuses of agriculture have been carried out regularly, on a ten-year basis, normally following the Population and Housing Censuses. The eighth one was conducted in 2021 and called National Census of Agriculture and Forestry (CAF).

==== Colombia ====
The first census of agriculture in Colombia was carried out in 1960 and covered 16 administrative departments. The second census of agriculture was carried out in 1970 and covered 21 administrative departments. The census of agriculture 2014 was the third census of agriculture conducted in the country and covered all rural areas.

==== Costa Rica ====
The National Agricultural Census (NAC) 2014 of the Republic of Costa Rica was the sixth census of agriculture to be conducted. The previous censuses of agriculture were conducted in 1950, 1955, 1963, 1973 and 1984.

Dominica

The country conducted its last census of agriculture in 1995.

Dominican Republic

The country conducted its last census of agriculture in 1981.

Ecuador

The country conducted its last census of agriculture in 1999/2000.

==== El Salvador ====
El Salvador conducted its first census of agriculture in 1950, followed by the other two censuses of agriculture carried out in 1961 and 1971. After 36 years, the country conducted its fourth Census of Agriculture in 2007–2008, within the framework of the 2010 census round.

==== French Guiana ====
The last census of agriculture was conducted in French Guiana in 2020. Previous censuses of agriculture were conducted in 1970, 1979, 1988, 2000 and 2010.

==== Grenada ====
Six censuses of agriculture have been conducted in Grenada in the last 50 years. Two were conducted as part of the West Indies, in 1946 and 1961, while the other four were conducted as Grenada's Censuses of Agriculture, in 1975, 1981, 1995 and 2012.

==== Guadeloupe ====
The last census of agriculture was conducted in the French territory of Guadeloupe in 2020. Previous censuses of agriculture were conducted in 1970, 1979, 1988, 2000 and 2010.

==== Guyana ====
Guyana planned to organize its first census of agriculture in 2020 but was finally cancelled due mainly to COVID-19.

==== Haiti ====
The General Agricultural Census (GAC) 2008/2009 was the first census of agriculture to be carried out in Haiti. Earlier structural data on agriculture were provided through population censuses (PCs), which were conducted in 1950, 1971 and 1982, and included a section with agriculture-related items.

Honduras

The country conducted its last census of agriculture in 1993.

==== Jamaica ====
The first census of agriculture in Jamaica was undertaken, together with the Census of Population and Housing, in 1943. The second one was carried out in 1961, while the third was conducted in 1968/1969, and represented the first participation of Jamaica in the FAO World Census of Agriculture Programme. Subsequently, censuses of agriculture were undertaken in 1978/1979, 1996 and 2007.

==== Martinique ====
The last census of agriculture was conducted in the French territory of Martinique in 2020. Previous censuses of agriculture were conducted in 1970, 1979, 1988, 2000 and 2010.

==== Mexico ====
The first census of agriculture in Mexico was carried out in 1930, followed, every ten years, by those carried out in 1940, 1950, 1960, 1970, 1981 and 1991. The last Census of Agriculture and Forestry (CAF) was conducted in 2007. The country planned to conduct a new census of agriculture in 2022.

==== Nicaragua ====
The first National Census of Agriculture in Nicaragua was conducted in 1963. A second census of agriculture was conducted in 1971. Almost 30 years later, Nicaragua carried out its third census of agriculture, in 2001. The fourth one was conducted in 2011.

==== Panama ====
The first nationwide census of agriculture in Panama was conducted in 1950 through complete enumeration; the second one was carried out in 1961, on a sample basis. The other six decennial censuses of agriculture were conducted, through complete enumeration, in 1971, 1981, 1991, 2001 and 2011.

==== Paraguay ====
The first nationwide census of agriculture in Paraguay was undertaken in 1942/1944. The second census was undertaken in 1957, the third in 1981, and the fourth in 1991. The National Census of Agriculture 2008, was the fifth one to be conducted in the country. The country was planning a new census of agriculture in 2022.

==== Peru ====
The first census of agriculture in Peru was conducted in 1961 (jointly with the Census of Population and Housing), followed by others conducted in 1972, 1994 and 2012.

==== Puerto Rico ====
The first census of agriculture in the Commonwealth of Puerto Rico was conducted in 1910. From that year to 1950, a census of agriculture was taken every ten years, in conjunction with the decennial censuses of population. Later, the timing was adjusted, such that the census of agriculture is conducted on the basis of a five-year data collection cycle, covering the years ending in 2 and 7. The census of agriculture 2002 for Puerto Rico was the first to be taken on a calendar-year basis, bringing the Puerto Rico census in line with the United States of America; subsequent censuses of agriculture continue to be done on a calendar basis, the last one conducted in 2018. The country was planning a new census of agriculture in 2022.

Saint Kitts and Nevis

The country conducted its last census of agriculture in 2000. The country was planning a new census of agriculture in 2022.

==== Saint Lucia ====
The 2007 Saint Lucia Census of Agriculture, was the country's sixth census of agriculture. Previous censuses of agriculture were conducted in 1946, 1961, 1973/74, 1986 and 1996. The country was planning a new census of agriculture in 2023.

Saint Vincent and the Grenadines

The country conducted its last census of agriculture in 2000. The country was planning a new census of agriculture in 2024.

==== Suriname ====
The first census of agriculture in Suriname was undertaken in 1953. The second and the third ones were taken in 1959 and 1969. The fourth census of agriculture was held in 1981, and the fifth one was carried out in 2008. The country was planning a new census of agriculture in 2023.

==== United States ====
The first census of agriculture in the United States of America was taken in 1840 as part of the sixth decennial census of population. After the 1920 census, the census interval was changed to every five years, resulting in a separate mid-decade census of agriculture being conducted in 1925, 1935, and 1945. The census of agriculture continued to be taken as part of the decennial census through 1950. From 1954 to 1974, the census was taken for the years ending in 4 and 9. In 1976, Congress changed the five-year data collection cycle to years ending in 2 and 7, to coincide with other economic censuses, a cycle that continues to this day. The 2017 Census of Agriculture was the twenty-ninth federal census of agriculture and the fifth to be conducted by the United States Department of Agriculture's (USDA), National Agricultural Statistics Service (NASS). The country was planning a new census of agriculture in 2022.

==== US Virgin Islands ====
The first census of agriculture was conducted in the United States Virgin Islands (U.S. Virgin Islands) in 1920 and the second in 1930. Other censuses were conducted at a ten-year interval through 1960 when, starting with the census taken in 1964, the U.S. Virgin Islands were included in the quinquennial (five-year) Census of agriculture Plan. Successively, the dates were adjusted in order to coincide with economic censuses, and, consequently, the subsequent censuses of agriculture were conducted in 1978 and 1982. After 1982, censuses of agriculture were reverted to a five-year cycle. The census of agriculture 2018 was the fifteenth one to be undertaken in the U.S. Virgin Islands. This U.S territory was planning a new census of agriculture in 2022.

==== Uruguay ====
The first census of agriculture in Uruguay was conducted in 1852. From 1852 to 2000, four livestock censuses and 14 general ACs were carried out. The last census of agriculture was carried out in 2011. The country was planning a new census of agriculture in 2022.

==== Venezuela ====
The first census of agriculture of the Bolivarian Republic of Venezuela was carried out in 1937. In 1949, 1961 and 1971, the censuses of agriculture and the censuses of population and housing were carried out jointly. A series of independent censuses of agriculture were conducted in 1985, 1997 and 2008. The report of the 2024 census was not published.

=== Asia ===
==== Armenia ====
The first comprehensive census of agriculture in Armenia was conducted in 2014. Until 2014, several specialized ACs were carried out, such as livestock censuses and permanent crop censuses.

==== Azerbaijan ====
The first comprehensive census of agriculture was carried out in 1921. In 2015, Azerbaijan conducted its second comprehensive census of agriculture. Between these two comprehensive censuses of agriculture, only specialized censuses of agriculture were conducted, such as livestock censuses or censuses of sown areas of crops, orchards and vineyards.

==== Bangladesh ====
The first census of agriculture undertaken in Bangladesh was carried out in 1960. The second one was conducted in 1977, followed by the 1983/1984, the 1996, the 2008 and the 2019/2020 censuses of agriculture.

==== Bhutan ====
The Kingdom of Bhutan conducted its first Renewable Natural Resources (RNR) Census in 2000 and then in 2009 and 2019.

==== Cambodia ====
Cambodia conducted its first National Census of Agriculture (NCAC) in 2013.

==== China ====
The censuses of agriculture were conducted in China in 1996, 2006 and 2016.

==== Cyprus ====
The Republic of Cyprus conducted six censuses of agriculture since the country achieved independence in 1960, 1977, 1985, 1994, 2003, 2010 and 2020. A Survey on Agricultural Production Methods (SAPM) was carried out together with the census of agriculture 2010.

==== Georgia ====
The first census of agriculture in Georgia was conducted in 2004. The Censuses of Agriculture 2014 was the second one conducted in conjunction with the 2014 General Population Census (GPC).

==== India ====
India participated in the World Programme for the Census of Agriculture (WCA) 1930, 1950 and 1960 through sample surveys carried out by the Directorate of National Sample Surveys. The 1970/1971 Census was considered the first comprehensive census of agriculture to be conducted in the country. Quinquennial censuses of agriculture were successively undertaken in 1976/1977, 1980/1981, 1985/1986, 1990/1991, 1995/1996, 2000/2001, 2005/2006, 2010/2011 and 2015/2016. A new census was planned for 2022.

==== Indonesia ====
The first census of agriculture of Indonesia was conducted in 1963, and, ever since then, every tenth year; therefore, in 1973, 1983, 1993, 2003 and 2013. A new census was planned for 2023.

==== Iran ====
The first Census of Agriculture in the country was conducted in 1973, followed by the ones conducted in 1988, 1993, 2003 and 2014.

Israel

The last census of agriculture was conducted in 2017.

==== Japan ====
The census of agriculture and forestry (CAF) in Japan was first conducted in 1950, in accordance with the World Programme for the Census of Agriculture 1950. Census data collection for the forestry has been conducted since 1960. Since the CAF 2005, censuses of agriculture and forestry have been conducted every five years. The CAF 2020 was the fifteenth census data collection to be conducted for agriculture and the ninth for forestry.

==== Jordan ====
The first census of agriculture was carried out in the Hashemite Kingdom of Jordan in 1953, followed by ACs conducted in 1965, 1975, 1983, 1997, 2007 and 2017.

==== Kazakhstan ====
The Census of Agriculture 2006/2007 was the first one to be carried out in Kazakhstan.

Kyrgyzstan

The last census of agriculture was conducted in 2002.

==== Republic of Korea ====
The Republic of Korea participated in the decennial WCA, with censuses of agriculture being conducted every ten years from 1960 to 1990 (in 1960, 1970, 1980 and 1990). Starting in 1995, censuses of agriculture in Korea were undertaken every five years. Starting in 2010, three censuses were consolidated into a single census, the Census of Agriculture, Forestry and Fisheries (CAFF), with a periodicity of five years. In addition, the Rural Community Survey, implemented since 1980, was carried out concurrently with the CAFF 2015. The country conducted a new CAFF in 2020.

==== Lao PDR ====
The first census of agriculture in the Lao People's Democratic Republic was conducted in 1998/1999, the second in 2010/2011 and the third in 2020.

==== Lebanon ====
Censuses of agriculture were conducted in Lebanon in 1961/1962, 1970 and 1998. A livestock census was conducted in 1980. The last census of agriculture was carried out in 2010.

Malaysia

The last census of agriculture was conducted in 2005.

==== Mongolia ====
Mongolia conducted its first Census of Agriculture in 2011.

==== Myanmar ====
Myanmar participated in the World Census of Agriculture in 1953/1954; however, the coverage of that census was limited to 2 143 village tracts in a neighbourhood of 252 townships. A sample-based census of agriculture was conducted in 1993, followed by complete censuses in 2003 and 2010.

==== Nepal ====
The first census of agriculture in Nepal was conducted in 1961/1962, followed by the decennial censuses of agriculture held in 1971/1972, 1981/1982, 1991/1992, 2001/2002 and 2011/2012. A new census was conducted in 2022.

==== Oman ====
The Sultanate of Oman has carried out four general censuses of agriculture, starting with the one in 1978/1979. The second census of agriculture was conducted in 1992/1993, and the third in 2004/2005. The fourth census of agriculture was carried out in 2012/2013.

==== Pakistan ====
Six censuses of agriculture were conducted in the Islamic Republic of Pakistan: the first in 1960, then in 1972, 1980, 1990, 2000 and 2010.

==== Palestine ====
The census of agriculture 2010 was the first one to be conducted in Palestine. Palestine conducted a second census of agriculture in 2021.

==== Philippines ====
The first decennial census of agriculture in the Philippines was conducted in 1960, followed by censuses carried out in 1971, 1981, 1991 and 2002. The 2012 Census of Agriculture and Fishery (CAF) was the sixth in a series of decennial censuses of agriculture and the fifth in a series of decennial censuses of fisheries to be conducted in the country.

Qatar

The country conducted its last census of agriculture in 2000.

==== Saudi Arabia ====
The first census of agriculture in Saudi Arabia was conducted in 1973/1974, the second in 1982, the third in 1999, and the fourth in 2015.

==== Sri Lanka ====
The first attempt to conduct a census of agriculture in the country was the Census of Production, held in 1921. Partial censuses of agriculture were then carried out in 1924 and 1929. Subsequently, censuses of agriculture were carried out in 1946, 1952, 1962, 1973, 1982 and 2002. In 2013/2014 the country conducted an Economic Census – Agricultural Activities (EC-AA).

==== Tajikistan ====
The Census of Agriculture 2013 was the first comprehensive census of agriculture to be conducted in the Republic of Tajikistan. Until 2013, only specialized censuses of agriculture were conducted, such as the census of crop sown areas, the livestock census and the census of permanent crops.

==== Thailand ====
The first census of agriculture in Thailand was conducted in 1950, followed by the ones carried out in 1963, 1978, 1993, 2003 and 2013.

Timor-Leste

The country conducted its first Timor-Leste Census of Agriculture (TLAC) in 2019 as an independent country.

==== Vietnam ====
The first census of agriculture in Vietnam was conducted in 1994. The second one was carried out in 2001, which was followed by those carried out in 2006, 2011 and 2016. In 2020, the General Statistics Office (GSO) implemented for the first time a mid-term census of agriculture, involving around 10% of total agricultural, forestry and fisheries holdings.

=== Europe ===
Eurostat, the statistical office of the European Union, provides information for all its member countries.

==== Albania ====
The 1998 Census of Agricultural Holdings (CAH) was the first census of agriculture conducted in Albania. The second census of agriculture was carried out in 2012.

==== Austria ====
Austria conducted its first census of agricultural and forestry holdings in 1902. Subsequent censuses of agriculture were held in 1930, 1939 and 1951, and every ten years from 1960 to 1990. The last three censuses of agriculture took place in 1999, 2010 and 2020. The census of agriculture 2010 was carried out together with the Survey on Agricultural Production Methods (SAPM).

Belarus

The last census of agriculture was conducted in 2019 integrated, for the first time, in the Population and Housing Census 2019.

==== Belgium ====
Belgium participated in all the census rounds. The first census of agriculture was conducted in 1846. Between 1846 and 1960, eight censuses were conducted, at intervals of 10 to 15 years. As one of the six founding countries of the European Union (EU), Belgium has been organizing censuses of agriculture harmonized with EU standards and requirements since 1960. The last census of agriculture was conducted in 2020. The Census of Agriculture 2010 was carried out together with the Survey on Agricultural Production Methods (SAPM).

==== Bulgaria ====
The first census of land ownership in Bulgaria was carried out in 1897. Subsequent censuses of agriculture were held in 1934 (under the general census of population), 1946, 1993, 2003, 2010 and 2020. The last census of agriculture, carried out in 2020, was the third one that complied with EU legislation and the second to be carried out after Bulgaria acceded to the EU.

==== Croatia ====
The first census of agriculture since independence was conducted in Croatia in 2003. Previously, a comprehensive census of agriculture was undertaken in 1960, while in 1969, the census of agriculture was conducted using the sample method. In 1971, 1981, 1991 and 2001, the enumeration of agricultural holdings was conducted in the framework of the Population Census. A Farm Structure Survey (FSS), was conducted in Croatia in 2010 on a sample basis. A Survey on Agricultural Production Methods (SAPM) was carried out together with the FSS 2010. The last census of agriculture was conducted in 2020.

==== Czechia ====
Czechia participated in the census rounds 1930, 1970, 1980 and 1990 as part of Czechoslovakia, the federal state formed by Czechia and Slovakia. These were followed by censuses of agriculture carried out in 2000, 2010 and 2020. The Census of Agriculture 2010 was conducted together with the Survey on Agricultural Production Methods (SAPM).

==== Denmark ====
Denmark has participated in census rounds since 1930. In the following years, the agricultural surveys were conducted as censuses (on a complete enumeration basis): until 1983, 1985, 1987, 1989, 1999, 2010 and 2020. A Survey on Agricultural Production Methods (SAPM) was carried out in 2011 to complete the data collected in the 2010 Census of Agriculture (or Farm Structure Survey, FSS).

==== Estonia ====
The Census of Agriculture 2020 was the seventh one to be conducted in Estonia. The previous ones were conducted in 1919, 1925, 1929, 1939 and 2001, 2010.

==== Finland ====
The first census of agriculture in Finland was conducted in 1910. Since then, censuses of agriculture have been conducted almost every ten years. The latest ones were carried out in 1959, 1969, 1990, 1999/2000 and 2020/2021. The eleventh and last one was carried out in 2020/2021.

==== France ====
The last census of agriculture was conducted in France in 2020. Previous censuses of agriculture were conducted in 1955, 1970, 1979, 1988, 2000 and 2010. The first census of agriculture was carried out only in France, in Europe. In French territories (French Guiana, Guadeloupe, Réunion and Martinique), censuses of agriculture were conducted starting from 1970.

==== Germany ====
Beginning with 1949, censuses of agriculture have been carried out in the Federal Republic of Germany in 1960, 1971 and 1979. The 1991 census of agriculture was the first carried out in unified Germany, followed by the ones conducted in 1999, 2010 and 2020. The census of agriculture 2010 was conducted together with the Survey on Agricultural Production Methods (SAPM).

==== Greece ====
The first census of agriculture was conducted in 1950. Since 1950, five censuses of agriculture have been held, in 1961, 1971, 1981, 1991, 1999/2000, 2009/2010 and 2021, the latter postponed from 2020 due to the Covid-19 pandemic. The 2009/2010 census of agriculture, was conducted simultaneously with the Survey on Agricultural Production Methods (SAPM).

==== Hungary ====
The first census of agriculture was conducted in Hungary in 1895, followed by the second one in 1935. Starting from 1972, censuses of agriculture were conducted regularly, in line with the ten-year rounds of the WCA, in 1972, 1981, 1991, 2000, 2010 and 2020. The Census of Agriculture 2010 was carried out together with the Survey on Agricultural Production Methods (SAPM).

==== Iceland ====
The Census of Agriculture 2010 was the first one conducted in Iceland. The last census of agriculture was conducted in 2020, sourced mainly from administrative records.

==== Ireland ====
Ireland participated in all census rounds. Censuses of agriculture were conducted annually between 1847 and 1953, and every five years from 1960 to 1980. The 1985 Census of Agriculture was cancelled on budgetary grounds and the next censuses were undertaken in 1991, 2000, 2010 and 2020.

==== Italy ====
The census of agriculture is carried out every ten years in Italy. Seven censuses of agriculture have been conducted, in the years 1961, 1970, 1982, 1990, 2000, 2010 and the latest in 2021.

==== Latvia ====
During the first Republic, in Latvia, six censuses of agriculture were carried out, in: 1920, 1923, 1929, 1935, 1937 and 1939. The first census of agriculture of Latvia was carried out in compliance with the requirements of EU legislation took place in 2001, followed by FSSs conducted (on sample basis) in 2003, 2005 and 2007. The last two censuses of agriculture were conducted in 2010 and 2020. The census of agriculture 2010 was carried out together with the Survey on Agricultural Production Methods (SAPM).

==== Lithuania ====
The first census of agriculture in Lithuania was conducted in 1930. The second one, in independent Lithuania, was conducted in 2003. The third census of agriculture was carried out in 2010, after Lithuania's accession to the EU. The last census of agriculture was carried out in 2020. The Census of Agriculture 2010 was carried out together with the Survey on Agricultural Production Methods (SAPM).

==== Luxembourg ====
Luxembourg has participated in census rounds since the 1950. A census of agriculture covering crops and livestock is undertaken annually, following almost the same criteria and definitions since 1953. Until 2010, the censuses were organized using an indirect data collection approach (that is, via municipalities). The censuses of agriculture 2010 and 2020 were conducted based on direct data collection.

==== Malta ====
Between 1949 and 1954, censuses of agriculture were carried out in Malta every year. The next ones were carried out in 1956, 1960, 1968/1969, 1979, 1982/1983 and 2001, followed by sample-based FSS in 2003, 2005 and 2007. The last census of agriculture was conducted in 2020/2021. The Census of Agriculture 2010 was carried out in conjunction with the Survey on Agricultural Production Methods (SAPM).

==== Montenegro ====
Censuses of agriculture in Montenegro were conducted in 1931, 1960 and 2010.

==== The Netherlands ====
From 1934, a census of agriculture has been carried out almost every year in the Netherlands. The last census of agriculture was conducted in 2020. The 2010 Census of Agriculture, was conducted together with the Survey on Agricultural Production Methods (SAPM). In recent years, the census of agriculture is conducted annually with the help of administrative registers and CAWI.

==== North Macedonia ====
The country conducted its first census of agriculture in 2007.

==== Norway ====
The first census of agriculture was carried out in Norway in conjunction with the census of population (CP) in 1835. Separate censuses devoted exclusively to agriculture were conducted in 1907, 1918, 1929, 1939, 1949, 1959, 1969, 1979, 1989, 1999, 2010 and the latest in 2020. The census of agriculture 2010 was carried out together with the Survey on Agricultural Production Methods (SAPM).

==== Poland ====
Annual June censuses of agriculture, covering the entire population of farms, were conducted from 1946 until 1988. Next censuses of agriculture were conducted in 1996, 2002, 2010 and the latest in 2020. The census of agriculture 2010 was carried out together with the Survey on Agricultural Production Methods (SAPM).

==== Portugal ====
The first exhaustive, systematic and organized statistical data collection on the agriculture of Portugal took place in 1934, with the "General inventory of livestock and poultry", which was later repeated in 1940 and 1972. In Portugal's Mainland, censuses of agriculture (farm surveys) were held in 1952–1954, 1968 and 1979, while in 1965, a census was conducted on agricultural holdings in the adjacent islands (Azores and Madeira). The first General Census on Agriculture was carried out in 1989, exhaustively and simultaneously across all regions of the country, and was harmonized with the EU. This was followed by the General Census of Agriculture carried out in 1999, 2009 and 2019/2020. The 2009 census of agriculture was carried out together with the survey on agricultural production methods (SAPM).

==== Republic of Moldova ====
The General Census of Agriculture (GAC) 2011 was the first comprehensive census of agriculture carried out in the Republic of Moldova. Until 2011, only specialized censuses of agriculture were conducted, such as the census of sown area in 1985, the livestock census in 1992, and the census of permanent crops in 1994.

==== Romania ====
Romania conducted its first regular census of agriculture in 1941 (together with the population census), followed in 1948 by a general census of agriculture. The third General Agricultural Census (GAC) was conducted in 2002, after more than 50 years. The last GACs were carried out in 2010 and 2020/2021.

==== Russia ====
The first All-Russian Census of Agriculture was conducted by the Russian Empire in 1916, and the next in 1917. The last large-scale census was conducted in Russia during the Soviet period in 1920. The 2006 All-Russia Census of Agriculture was the first comprehensive census of agriculture conducted in the country. The last census of agriculture was conducted in 2016.

==== Serbia ====
The last comprehensive census of agriculture in the Republic of Serbia was carried out in 2012. The previous census of agriculture was conducted in 1960. Between these two censuses, basic structural data on agriculture were collected within the Population Censuses.

==== Slovakia ====
The first census of agriculture was conducted in the Slovak Republic in 2001, followed by those carried out in 2010 and 2020/2021. The census of agriculture 2010 was conducted in conjunction with the Survey on Agricultural Production Methods (SAPM).

==== Slovenia ====
Two independent censuses of agriculture were conducted by complete enumeration in Slovenia before the year 2000: the first was in 1930 and the second in 1960. In 1969, a sample census of agriculture was carried out. In 1971, 1981 and 1991, censuses of agricultural holdings were conducted as a component of population censuses. The first census of agriculture to be carried out in the independent Republic of Slovenia took place in 2000; the second in 2010, and the most recent one was conducted in 2020.

==== Spain ====
The first census of agriculture in Spain was carried out in 1962 and, since then, censuses of agriculture were conducted in 1972, 1982, 1989, 1999, 2009 and 2020/2021. The census of agriculture 2009 was conducted together with the Survey on Agricultural Production Methods (SAPM).

==== Sweden ====
The Swedish accession to the EU in 1995 created the need to adapt national agricultural statistics to EU legislation. Until 2001, Sweden compiled FSSs annually, switching every year between EU and national legislation. The last two censuses of agriculture were conducted in 2010 and 2020. The census of agriculture 2010 was conducted together with the Survey on Agricultural Production Methods (SAPM).

==== Switzerland ====
Switzerland has a long tradition of conducting censuses in the area of agriculture. From 1955, the census of agriculture, conducted every five years, was the main source of information. A turning point came in 1966, with the introduction of farm surveys based on administrative sources. Switzerland has a yearly census for the main agricultural topics like farmland, livestock and labour force. The main data source is the declaration for direct payments for farmers. The last two censuses of agriculture were conducted in 2010 and 2020. The 2010 census of agriculture was carried out together with a thematic survey (on holdings' labour force and characteristics related to agricultural production methods) and the Survey on Agricultural Production Methods (SAPM).

==== United Kingdom ====
A census of agriculture is conducted in the United Kingdom of Great Britain and Northern Ireland (UK) since 1866. The UK has participated in the ten-yearly census rounds since 1930, with a selected year. A census of agriculture is carried out once every ten years, 2021 being the most recent (delayed by Covid-19). The census of agriculture 2010 was carried out together with the Survey on Agricultural Production Methods (SAPM).

=== Oceania ===
==== American Samoa ====
The U.S. Bureau of the Census conducted the first Census of Agriculture in this U.S. territory in 1920, as part of the decennial Population and Housing Census (PHC). Subsequent censuses of agriculture were carried out every ten years. Since 1998, American Samoa was included in the Five-Year Agriculture Census Program. The next census was carried out in 2003. The 2018 Census of Agriculture was the twelfth census to be conducted in American Samoa, and the fourth to be conducted strictly as an independent census of agriculture since the one undertaken in 1998.

==== Australia ====
Agricultural commodity data have been collected in Australia since the 1860s. The census of agriculture was usually conducted annually at the end of March, until 1996–1997, when the Australian Bureau of Statistics (ABS), to ensure better alignment with other ABS surveys, changed the collection period to 30 June. The current strategy envisages a five-year-interval census with sample surveys in inter-censal years. Subsequent censuses of agriculture have been conducted on a quinquennial basis since 2000/2001. The last census of agriculture was conducted in 2021.

==== Cook Islands ====
The first census of agriculture in the Cook Islands was conducted in 1988 followed by the ones conducted in 2000, 2011 and 2021/2022.

==== Fiji ====
The 2020 National Agricultural Census (NAC) in Fiji, was the fifth to be conducted by the country. Before then, Fiji had undertaken three NACs: in 1968, 1978, 1991, and 2009.

==== Guam ====
The U.S. Bureau of the Census conducted the first census of agriculture in this U.S. territory in 1920, as part of the decennial Population and Housing Census (PHC) of that year. From 1930 through 1960, censuses of agriculture continued to be carried out in conjunction with the decennial PHC program. Beginning in 1964, censuses on Guam were conducted as part of the quinquennial censuses of agriculture, and have been conducted on a five-year cycle for years ending in 2 and 7. The 2018 census was the fifteenth census of agriculture to be conducted by Guam. Guam was planning to conduct its next agricultural census in 2022.

Kiribati

The country conducted its first census of agriculture in 2020 by including an agriculture module in its population census 2020.

Marshall Islands

The country conducted its first census of agriculture in 2021 by including an agriculture module in its population census 2021.

==== Micronesia ====
The Federated States of Micronesia conducted in 2016 its first agriculture census since the country became a sovereign nation.

Nauru

The country conducted its first census of agriculture in 2021 by including an agriculture module in its population census 2021.

==== New Zealand ====
New Zealand has participated in the World Programme of Agriculture since the 1950 round. From 1955-1956 until 1987, a full postal census of agriculture was conducted annually. Four other censuses were conducted in 1990, 1994, 2002, 2012 and 2017. The country was planning a new census in 2022.

==== Niue ====
The first census of agriculture in Niue was conducted in 1989. The second one was carried out after 20 years, in 2009. The last census of agriculture was conducted in 2021.

==== Northern Mariana Islands ====
The first census of agriculture in the Commonwealth of Northern Mariana Islands (CNMI) was conducted in 1970, in conjunction with the decennial population census. This practice continued in 1980 and 1990. However, in 1998, the CNMI carried out the first agriculture census separately from the population census. The self-standing agriculture census was conducted by NASS. The 2002 Census of Agriculture in the CNMI, the fifth in the series, was synchronized with the quinquennial programme of censuses of agriculture followed in the mainland United States of America. The census of agriculture 2018 was the last census in the CNMI. The next census was planned in 2022.

==== Palau ====
The 2015 Census of Population, Housing and Agriculture (CPHA) was the first census in Palau in which items on agricultural activities of households were included in a census. The country conducted a new census of agriculture in 2020 by including an agriculture module in its population census 2020.

Papua New Guinea

Papua New Guinea conducted its last census of agriculture in 1961/1962.

==== Samoa ====
Samoa conducted its first census of agriculture in 1989. The second census was carried out in 1999, the third one in 2009, and the fourth one in 2019.

==== Tonga ====
The first census of agriculture in Tonga was conducted in 1985. The second one was carried out in 2001, and the third one was undertaken after 14 years, in 2015.

==== Tuvalu ====
The country conducted its first census of agriculture in 2017 by including an agriculture module in its population census 2017.

==== Vanuatu ====
The first census of agriculture in Vanuatu was conducted in 1983, and the second in 1993. The third census of agriculture was undertaken in 2007. The fourth census was underway in early 2023 but was put on hold in March 2023 due to the two Category 4 Cyclones Judy and Kevin that made landfall over the country.

== See also ==
- List of national and international statistical services
- Intercensal estimate
- World Programme for the Census of Agriculture 2020

== Sources ==
This article incorporates text from a free content work. Licensed under CC BY-SA 3.0 IGO (license statement/permission). Text taken from World Programme for the Census of Agriculture 2020 Volume 1 – Programme, concepts and definitions, FAO, FAO.

This article incorporates text from a free content work. Licensed under CC BY-SA 3.0 IGO (license statement/permission). Text taken from 2000 World Census of Agriculture – Methodological Review, FAO, FAO.

This article incorporates text from a free content work. Licensed under CC BY-SA 3.0 IGO (license statement/permission). Text taken from World Programme for the Census of Agriculture 2020, Volume 2 – Operational guidelines, FAO, FAO.

This article incorporates text from a free content work. Licensed under CC BY-SA 3.0 IGO (license statement/permission). Text taken from Main results and metadata by country (2006–2015). World Programme for the Census of Agriculture 2010, FAO, FAO.

This article incorporates text from a free content work. Licensed under CC BY-SA 3.0 IGO (license statement/permission). Text taken from National agricultural census operations and COVID-19, FAO, FAO.

This article incorporates text from a free content work. Licensed under CC BY-SA 3.0 IGO (license statement/permission). Text taken from Impact of COVID-19 on national censuses of agriculture (Status overview) (2020), FAO, FAO.
