= United States Census of Agriculture =

American quinquennial agricultural survey

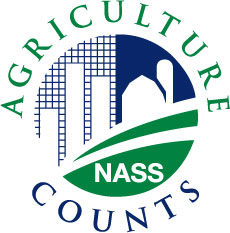
- National Agricultural Statistics Service logo.
- Genre: Census
- Frequency: Quinquenial
- Country: United States
- Inaugurated: 1840; 186 years ago
- Most recent: 2022
- Organizer: National Agricultural Statistics Service
- Website: agcensus.usda.gov

The Census of Agriculture is a census conducted every five years by the U.S. Department of Agriculture's National Agricultural Statistics Service (NASS) that provides the only source of uniform, comprehensive agricultural data for every county in the United States.

== Overview ==
The census is a complete count of U.S. farms and ranches and the people who operate them. The Census looks at land use and ownership, operator characteristics, production practices, income and expenditures and many other areas. This picture, when compared to earlier censuses, helps to measure trends and new developments in the agricultural sector of the nation's economy.

Title 7 of the United States Code requires all those who receive a census report form to respond – even if they did not operate a farm or ranch during the census year. The same law protects the confidentiality of all census respondents. NASS uses the information only for statistical purposes and publishes data only in tabulated totals. The report cannot be used for purposes of taxation, investigation or regulation. The privacy of individual census records is also protected from disclosure through the Freedom of Information Act.

For census purposes, a farm is defined as a place from which $1,000 or more of agricultural products were produced and sold, or normally would have been sold, during the census year. This farm definition has changed nine times throughout history and the current definition has been in effect since 1974.

== History ==
The first Census of Agriculture was taken in 1840 as part of the sixth decennial population census. The census remained a part of the decennial census through 1950, with separate mid-decade Censuses of Agriculture taken in 1925, 1935 and 1945. As time passed, census years were adjusted until the reference year coincided with the economic censuses covering other sectors of the nation's economy. Currently, the Census of Agriculture is conducted for years ending in 2 and 7.

The 1997 Census of Agriculture has historical significance because it was the first conducted by NASS after the 1997 Appropriations Act shifted responsibility of the Census of Agriculture from the U.S. Census Bureau, which is part of the U.S. Department of Commerce, to USDA.

== Uses of census data ==
Census data is used by all those who serve farmers and rural communities – federal, state and local governments, agribusinesses, trade associations and many others. For instance:

- Companies and cooperatives use the information to determine the locations of facilities that will serve agricultural producers.
- Community planners use the information to target needed services to rural residents.
- USDA uses the information to ensure that local service centers are staffed at appropriate levels.
- Legislators use the information when shaping farm policies and programs.
- Farmers and ranchers use Census data to help make informed decisions about the future of their own operations.
