= Agricultural Resource Management Survey =

The Agricultural Resource Management Survey is the United States Department of Agriculture’s primary source of information on the financial condition, production practices, resource use, and economic well-being of America's farm households. Sponsored jointly by the Economic Research Service (ERS) and the National Agricultural Statistics Service (NASS), ARMS began in 1996, as a synthesis of the former USDA cropping practice, chemical use, and farm costs and returns surveys, which dated back to 1975. ARMS data underpin USDA's annual estimates of net farm income and fulfills a congressional mandate that USDA provide annual cost-of-production estimates for commodities covered under farm support legislation. ARMS also provides data regarding chemical use on field crops required under environmental and food safety legislation.

Additional information about the survey and its uses at http://www.ers.usda.gov/data-products/arms-farm-financial-and-crop-production-practices.
