= Intercensal estimate =

Rough calculation of population estimation between censuses

In demographics, an intercensal estimate is an estimate of population between official census dates with both of the census counts being known. Some nations produce regular intercensal estimates while others do not. Intercensal estimates can be less or more informative than official census figures, depending on methodology, completeness, accuracy (as they can have significant undercounts or overestimates) and date of data, and can be released by nations, subnational entities, or other organizations including those not affiliated with governments. They differ from population projections as they are from past dates, although intercensal estimates can be used to form population projections.

== Postcensal estimate ==
Intercensal estimates are one of the two types of population estimates, the other being postcensal estimates. Intercensal estimates are considered to be more accurate than postcensal estimates, because they approximated between two dates with the exact figure (accounting for errors) being known and being considered factual. Additionally, postcensal estimates can be based on the prior census. (e.g. a 2011 postcensal estimate can be based on a 2001 census, due to time and complexity of producing estimates from 2011 census data.).

== Intercensal survey ==
All counts are estimates, including censuses (in reality every survey has a margin of error, even most census counts are corrected for data omission, duplication, cheating, miscounts) but some counts include random sampling (door to door and/or by calling

== By country ==
- Statistics Indonesia (BPS) releases province by province annual estimates for all provinces, regencies, and kota in Indonesia, with some provinces more up to date than others. A survey in conducted every 10 years, 5 years post census.
- China 1% Survey (全国1%人口抽样调查) 5 years after each census samples 1% of the population to produce population estimates between official 10 year censuses.
- The Brazilian Institute of Geography and Statistics (IBGE) releases regular annual estimates for all states and cities in Brazil.
- Statistics Canada releases regular quarter annual intercensal estimates for provinces and territories in Canada.
- Japan releases regular annual intercensal estimates for all prefectures and cities, every October. National estimates are released monthly.
- The United States Census Bureau releases regular intercensal estimates of total population of the country, states, and metropolitan areas annually. Unincorporated areas are counted only during censuses. California compiles annual estimates separately from the Census Bureau, which includes unincorporated areas and differing methodology.
- Mexico technically calls it an intercensal survey but is essentially a mini-census between decade censuses, effectively having a five-year census period.
