= National Institute of Food and Agriculture =

U.S. government research body

Agency overview
- Formed: 2009
- Preceding agency: Cooperative State Research, Education, and Extension Service
- Headquarters: Jamie L. Whitten Building, Washington, D.C.
- Agency executive: Dr. Jaye L. Hamby, Director
- Website: nifa.usda.gov

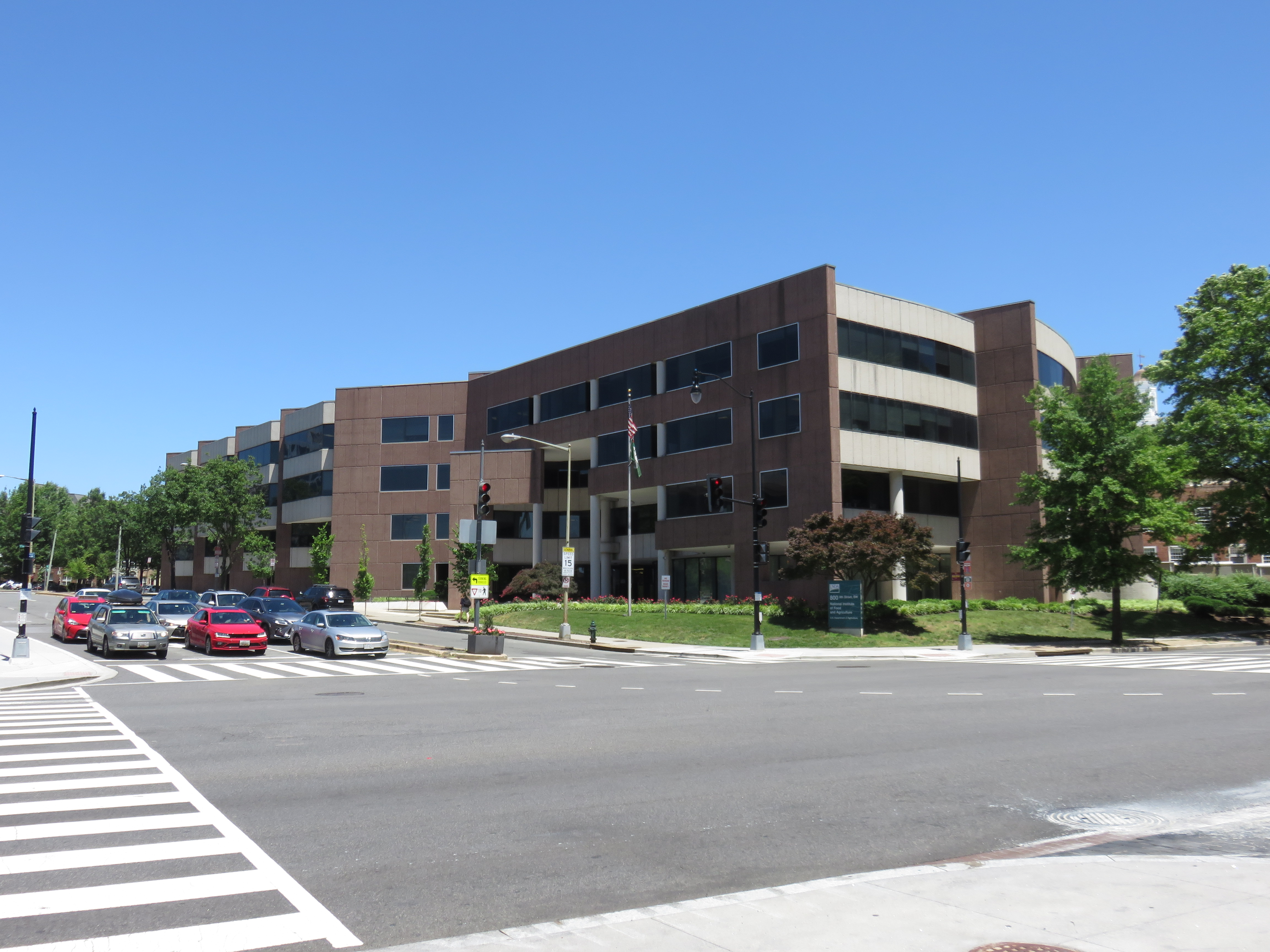
NIFA headquarters in Washington, D.C., in 2019, prior to the Kansas City relocation.

The National Institute of Food and Agriculture (NIFA) is a U.S. federal government body whose creation was mandated in the Food, Conservation, and Energy Act of 2008. Its purpose is to consolidate all federally funded agricultural research, and it is subordinate to the Department of Agriculture. It replaced the Cooperative State Research, Education, and Extension Service in 2009. Dr. Jaye L. Hamby was appointed NIFA Director on March 20, 2025.

NIFA supports more than 70 statutory grant programs. These programs fulfill statutory requirements and provide research, education, Extension services and hands-on applications to farmers, ranchers, foresters, communities, and 4-H members. This cooperative partnership between NIFA, state, and local governments leverages university expertise for research and education and provides local Extension offices in U.S. counties/county equivalents that directly serve the people.

The transformation from CSREES to NIFA began with a task force chaired by William Henry Danforth and appointed by then Secretary of Agriculture Ann Veneman. The Danforth Task Force recommended that Congress authorize the creation of NIFA as a way to strengthen agriculture research and to attract additional highly competitive research scientists to this field of endeavor. A growing program in competitive research grants will be a hallmark of the new agency. The creation of NIFA strengthened USDA's competitive research portfolio by replacing the National Research Initiative with the Agriculture and Food Research Initiative (AFRI). NIFA awards research funding through a combination of competitive grants and funds allocated to states under statutory formulas.

== Grant programs ==
Primarily through AFRI, NIFA awards from a number of different grant programs to support it's goal of strengthening agricultural research in the U.S. These include:

- The AFRI Education and Workforce Development Program which supports development of the next generation of professionals in food and agricultural sciences.
- The AFRI Foundational and Applied Science Program. This program represents AFRI's primary competitive grant program which funds a large variety of research in agricultural sciences, mostly to U.S. universities.
- The Strengthening Agricultural Systems Program. This program funds a relatively small amount of individual awards, compared to the Foundation and Applied Science Program. However, these awards are generally integrated, cross-institution and larger at around $10 million each.
- NIFA also awards grants to a number of non-AFRI programs with broad agricultural applications.

== NIFA Fellowship Program ==
The NIFA Fellowship Program awards grants from NIFA to doctoral students and early career postdoctoral scholars. The fellowship program is funded through the AFRI Education and Workforce Development Program. In 2026, the USDA announced awards for 49 predoctoral fellowships and 6 postdoctoral fellowships. Predoctoral fellowship grants are awarded as a 3-year project as no more than a $180,000 award total, this includes a maximum $35,000 annual stipend and $22,000 for tuition. Meanwhile, postdoctoral fellowship grants are awarded up to $244,000 for a 2-year project. The USDA has awarded these fellowships since 2011.

Applicants must be United States citizens or permanent residents. For predoctoral fellowships, applicants must be in their second or third year of their graduate program while postdoctoral fellowship applicants must have received their doctoral degree by the start of the project.

Students or postdoctoral scholars who have been awarded a fellowship have focused on a variety of agricultural-related projects, such as plant crops to improve ecosystems functions or the effects of norovirus on the development of food allergies. Generally, awardees focus on research challenges in agriculture. The NIFA Fellowship Program is similar to other federal fellowship programs meant to support young research scientists in the U.S. such as the NSF Graduate Research Fellowship Program.

== Relocation ==
In 2019, NIFA relocated 294 out of 315 staff members from Washington DC to Kansas City. The move was part of a larger uprooting including the Economic Research Service. The USDA cited the move was an effort to attract talent and lower costs by establishing an operational headquarters. The Government Accountability Office reported the agency violated the Antideficiency Act. Between 40-60% of employees left the agency after receiving the ultimatum to move or leave the agency. Black employees previously holding 47% of roles dropped to 19% post relocation. After the move NIFA employees voted to unionize under the American Federation of Government Employees. Due to Congressional concern, the Conducting Oversight to Secure Transparency (COST) of Relocations Act was proposed, but did not become law.

During the Biden administration, NIFA headquarters moved back to Washington, DC, while the Kansas City office was retained.

== See also ==
- Agriculture Innovation Center
- Electrical energy efficiency on United States farms
