= National Agricultural Statistics Service =

US federal government agricultural statistical agency

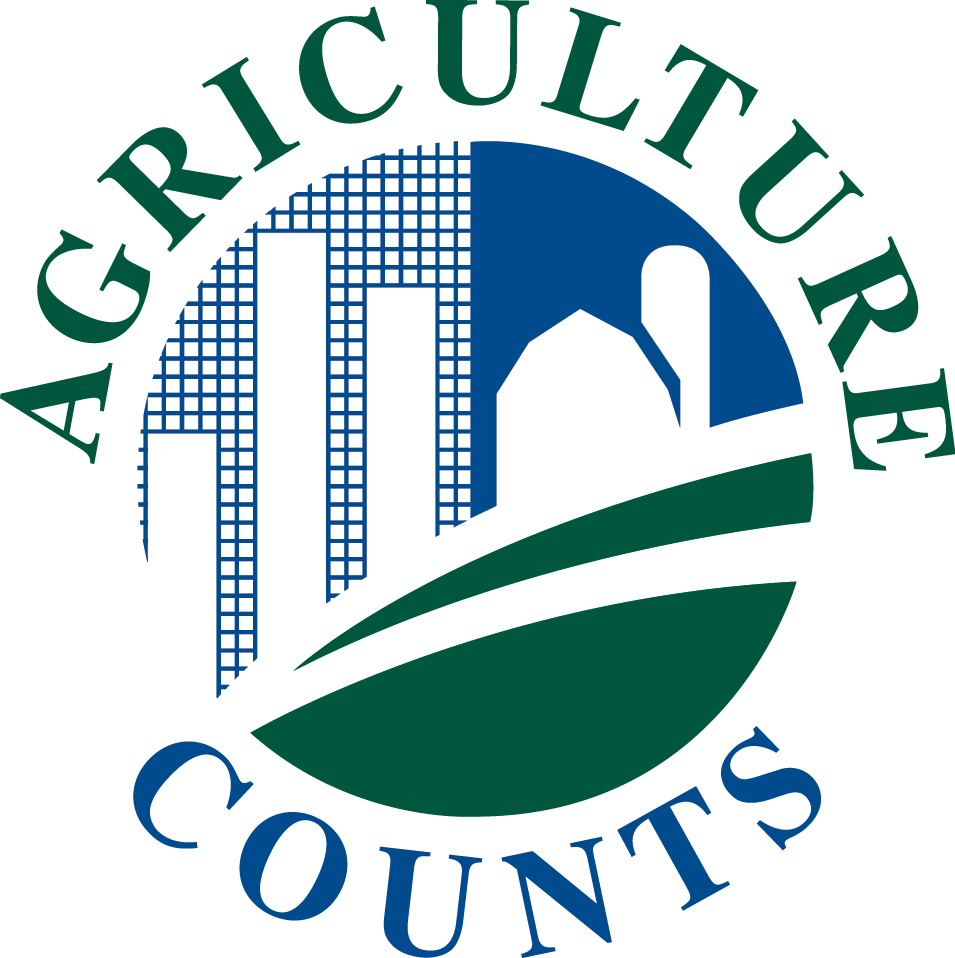

Agency overview
- Formed: 1863; 163 years ago
- Jurisdiction: Federal government of the United States
- Headquarters: Washington, D.C., U.S.
- Agency executive: Joseph L. Parsons, Administrator
- Parent department: United States Department of Agriculture
- Website: https://www.nass.usda.gov/

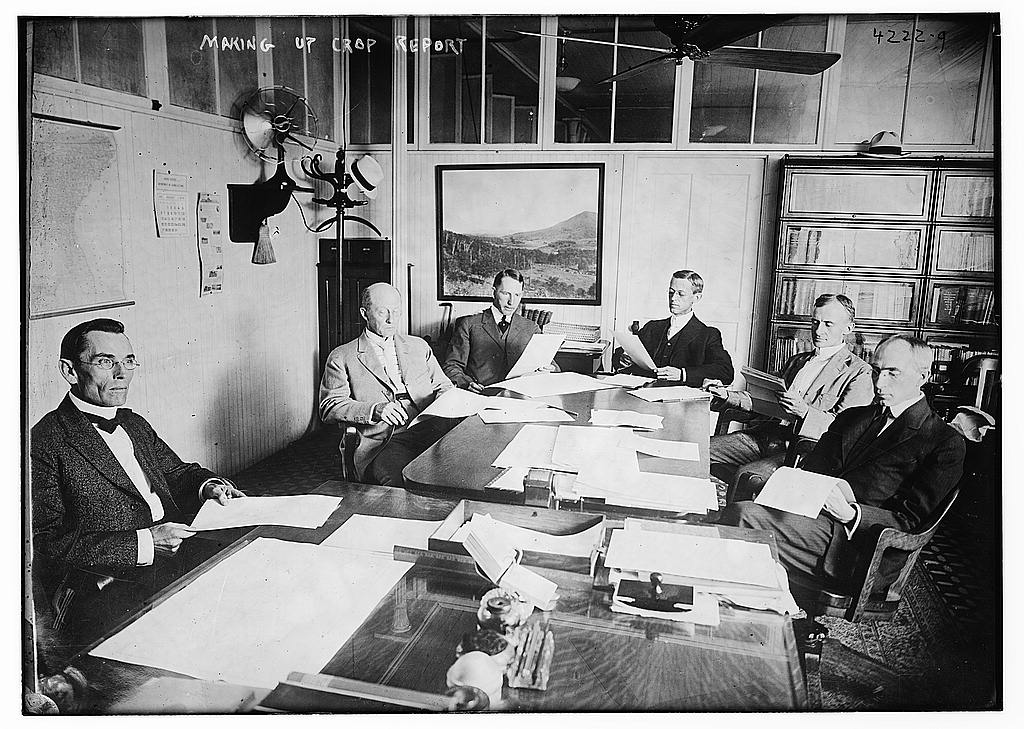
Compiling the crop report in 1917

The National Agricultural Statistics Service (NASS) is the statistical branch of the U.S. Department of Agriculture and a principal agency of the U.S. Federal Statistical System. NASS has 12 regional offices throughout the United States and Puerto Rico and a headquarters unit in Washington, D.C. NASS conducts hundreds of surveys and issues nearly 500 national reports each year on issues including agricultural production, economics, demographics and the environment. NASS also conducts the United States Census of Agriculture every five years.

== History ==
During the Civil War, USDA collected and distributed crop and livestock statistics to help farmers assess the value of the goods they produced. At that time, commodity buyers usually had more current and detailed market information than did farmers, a circumstance that often prevented farmers from getting a fair price for their goods. Producers in today's marketplace would be similarly handicapped were it not for the information provided by NASS.

The creation of USDA's Crop Reporting Board in 1905 (now called the Agricultural Statistics Board) was another landmark in the development of a nationwide statistical service for agriculture. A USDA reorganization in 1961 led to the creation of the Statistical Reporting Service, known today as National Agricultural Statistics Service (NASS).

The 1997 Appropriations Act shifted the responsibility of conducting the Census of Agriculture from U.S. Census Bureau to USDA. Since then the census has been conducted every five years by NASS. Results from the 2012 Census of Agriculture were released on May 2, 2014.

== Surveys and reports ==
The primary sources of information for NASS reports are farmers, ranchers, livestock feeders, slaughterhouse managers, grain elevator operators and other agribusinesses. NASS relies on these survey respondents to voluntarily supply data for most reports.

NASS surveys are conducted in a variety of ways, including mail surveys, telephone interviews, online response, face-to-face interviews and field observations. Once the information is gathered and interpreted, NASS issues estimates and forecasts for crops and livestock and publishes reports on a variety of topics including production and supplies of food and fiber, prices paid and received by farmers, farm labor and wages, farm income and finances, and agricultural chemical use. NASS's field offices publish local data about many of the same topics.

== Importance of NASS data ==
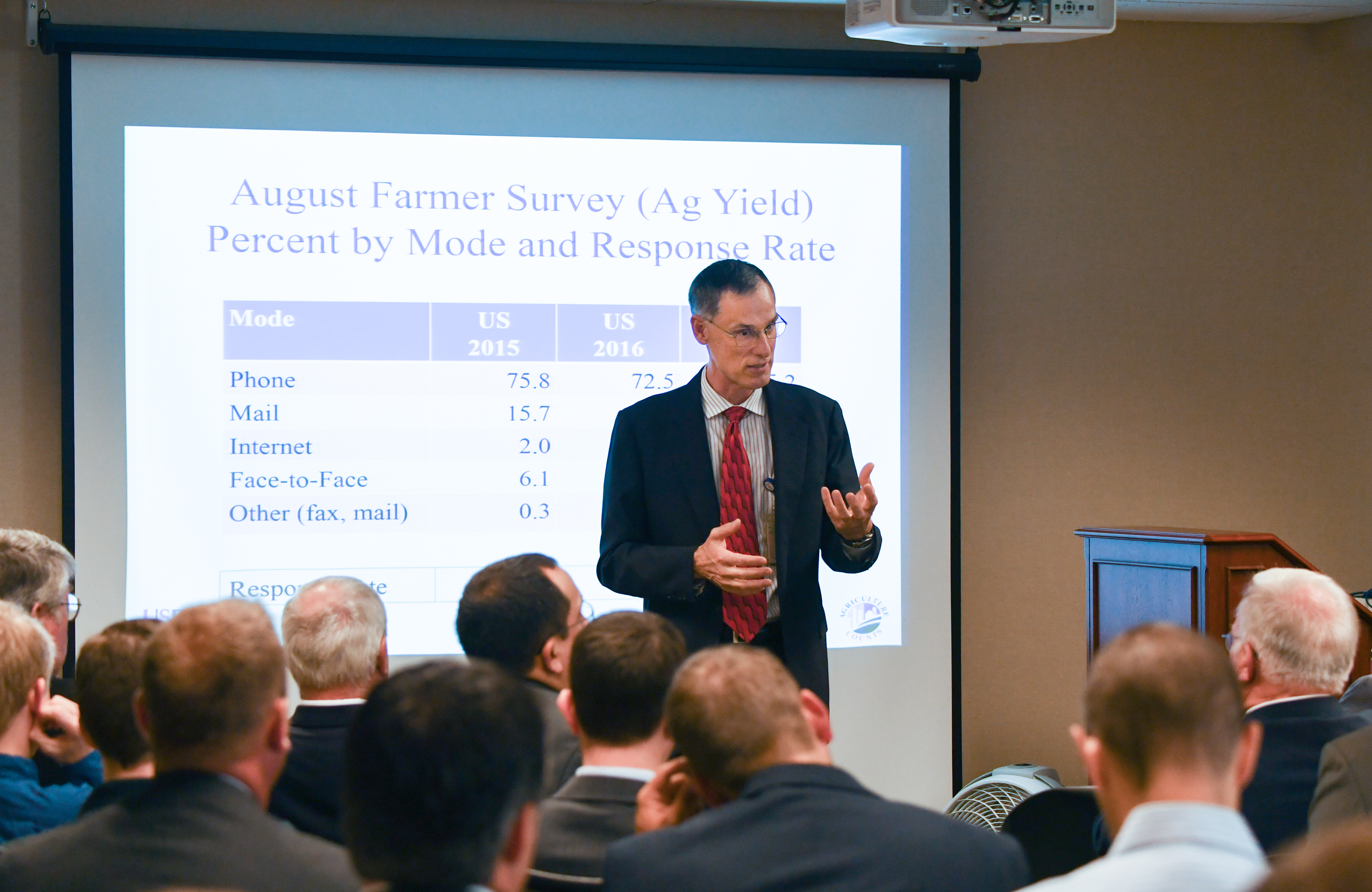
A NASS statistician explains data at a 2017 briefing.

Producers, farm organizations, agribusinesses, lawmakers and government agencies all rely on the information produced by NASS. For instance:

- Statistical information on acreage, production, stocks, prices and value is essential for the smooth operation of federal farm programs.
- Agricultural data are indispensable for planning and administering related federal and state programs in such areas as consumer protection, conservation and environmental quality, trade, education and recreation.
- NASS data helps to ensure an orderly flow of goods and services among agriculture's producing, processing and marketing sectors.
- Reliable, timely and detailed crop and livestock statistics help to maintain a stable economic climate and minimize the uncertainties and risks associated with the production, marketing and distribution of commodities.
- Farmers and ranchers rely on NASS reports in making various production and marketing decisions, such as how much grain to plant, how much livestock to raise and when to buy or sell agricultural commodities.
- NASS estimates and forecasts are used by the transportation sector, warehouse and storage companies, banks and other lending institutions, commodity traders and food processors.
- The businesses that provide farmers with seeds, equipment, chemicals and other goods and services use the data when planning their marketing strategies.
- Analysts transform the statistics into projections of coming trends, interpretations of the trends' economic implications and evaluations of alternative courses of action for producers, agribusinesses and policymakers.
- Crop reports relating to acreage, yields, and production.

== See also ==
- Agricultural Resource Management Survey
- United States Census of Agriculture
- World Agricultural Supply and Demand Estimates
- Economic Research Service
