= Economic Research Service =

Component of the United States Department of Agriculture

Agency overview
- Formed: April 3, 1961; 65 years ago
- Preceding agency: Bureau of Agricultural Economics
- Jurisdiction: United States Department of Agriculture
- Headquarters: Washington, D.C., United States
- Agency executive: Kelly Maguire, Administrator
- Website: www.ers.usda.gov

The Economic Research Service (ERS) is a component of the United States Department of Agriculture (USDA) and a principal agency of the Federal Statistical System of the United States. It provides information and research on agriculture and economics.

== History ==
The first USDA agency formally tasked with data collection was the Division of Statistics, created in 1863, one year after the USDA itself was created. By 1902, a Division of Foreign Markets had been created, and the following year, that division was merged with the Division of Statistics to form the Bureau of Statistics. In 1914, the bureau was renamed the Bureau of Crop Estimates, and in 1921 this bureau merged with the Bureau of Markets to form the Bureau of Markets and Crop Estimates. This merger brought together "responsibility for the collection of farm-level crop and livestock data with that for major domestic and foreign commodity market transactions" in a single agency.

While the USDA's data collection activities were developing, the department was also developing expertise in agricultural economics research. In 1903, the Office of Farm Management was formed within the Bureau of Plant Industry. In 1915, this office was transferred to the Office of the Secretary to provide analytic support during World War I. In 1919, the office was renamed in Office of Farm Management and Farm Economics. In 1920, the office became a separate USDA agency.

In 1922, the Bureau of Agricultural Economics (BAE), the ERS's immediate predecessor, was established by the merger of the Office of Farm Management and Farm Economics and the Bureau of Markets and Crop Estimates, bringing together responsibility for data collection and economic research/analysis in a single agency. This new agency brought together for the first time in data collection and economic analysis and research. The first leader of the BAE was the pioneering agricultural economist Henry Charles Taylor, appointed by Secretary of Agriculture Henry C. Wallace. In its initial years the BAE recruited agricultural economists from the handful of land-grant universities that offered the Ph.D in agriculture, such as Wisconsin, Minnesota, and Cornell. In 1937, the USDA Cotton Annex in the Southwest neighborhood of Washington, D.C. was built to contain offices and research facilities of the BAE.

The ERS was established by Secretary of Agriculture Memorandum 1446, supp. 1, of April 3, 1961. It was subsequently consolidated with other USDA units (including the Economic Development Service, established in 1969, and the Economic Management Support Center, established 1974) into the Economics, Statistics, and Cooperatives Service by Secretary's Memorandum 1927, effective December 23, 1977. The agency was redesignated as the Economic Research Service by secretarial order of October 1, 1981.

Under the Trump administration, the ERS and another USDA agency, the National Institute of Food and Agriculture were directed to move from the USDA's headquarters in Washington, D.C. to the Kansas City metropolitan area. Two-thirds of the USDA employees reassigned chose to quit rather than accept relocation. In 2018, the office of Trump's Agriculture Secretary, Sonny Perdue, also issued a directive to ERS and other research components of USDA, ordering them to include a disclaimer on peer-reviewed research in scientific journals stating that findings and conclusions were "preliminary" and "should not be construed to represent any agency determination or policy." Susan Offutt, the ERS administrator under the Clinton and George W. Bush administrations, said that the requirement was contrary to the USDA's longstanding policy that permitted and encouraged federal scientists to publish work in journals, and the "disclaimer" mandate was strongly criticized by USDA employees, science advocates, and scientific journal editors. In May 2019, following an outcry, the USDA rescinded the directive.

Current and former employees of the ERS were strongly critical of the relocation to Kansas City and other Trump administration policies, and the exodus of scientific and economic talent and disruption to federal research (especially on climate change and food security) that they had caused. The move to Kansas City area resulted in an attrition rate particularly high in the Resource and Rural Economics Division (90%) and in the Food Economics Division (up to 89%). ERS economists said that the Trump administration's moves were retaliation against the agency for publishing research reports detailing the negative economic effects of Trump's policies, including the first tariffs and Republican tax legislation, on U.S. agriculture.

During the Biden administration, ERS headquarters moved back to Washington, DC, while the Kansas City office was retained.

== Functions ==
Today, ERS's mission is to provide "economic research and information to inform public and private decision making on economic and policy issues related to agriculture, food, natural resources, and rural America."

The ERS and National Agricultural Statistics Service (NASS) jointly fund and manage the Agricultural Resource Management Survey, a multi-phase, nationally representative survey of U.S. farms that is the USDA's "primary source of information on the financial condition, production practices, and resource use of America's farm businesses and the economic well-being of America's farm households."

The ERS publishes the magazine Amber Waves five times a year. The publication began in February 2003; it replaced Agricultural Outlook, FoodReview, and Rural America. The publication "features information and economic analysis about food, farms, natural resources, and rural community issues" and includes data and charts on various economic indications, including livestock cash receipts, farm household income, agricultural imports and exports, and food spending.

== Leadership, organization, and staff ==
The ERS is led by an administrator, historically a career Senior Executive Service appointee that (along with NASS) reported to the Under Secretary for Research, Education, and Economics. However, in 2019, the Trump administration, under Agriculture Secretary Sonny Perdue, moved to place ERS under the direct oversight of a political appointee, reporting to the chief economist under the Office of the Secretary. This restructuring prompted criticism that the ERS's historically independent and autonomous data-collection mission would be compromised by political interference.

The ERS is organized into the Office of the Administrator and four divisions: The Food Economics Division; the Information Services Division; the Market and Trade Economics Division; and the Resource and Rural Economics Division. Each division is led by a director.

ERS had about 510 employees in 1998, 430 employees in 2009, and 250 employees in 2019. In 2019, in the wake of a relocation order, ERS employees voted overwhelmingly to unionize under the American Federation of Government Employees, forming their own bargaining unit.

== Administrators ==
The following individuals served as the administrators of the ERS from 1961 to the present:

1. 1961–1965: Nathan M. Koffsky
2. 1965–1972: Melvin L. Upchurch
3. 1972–1977: Quentin M. West
4. 1977–1981: Kenneth R. Farrell (ESCS Administrator); J.B. Penn (Associate Administrator for Economics)
5. 1982–1993: John E. Lee
6. 1993–1996: Acting administrators
7. 1996–2006: Susan Offutt
8. 2007–2011: Kitty Smith
9. 2011–2018: Mary Bohman
10. 2018–2020: Acting administrators
11. 2020–2025: Spiro Stefanou
12. 2025-present: Kelly Maguire

== See also ==
- Agricultural extension
- Agricultural Research Service
- Economics of global warming
  - Economics of climate change mitigation
- Henry Cantwell Wallace
- World Agricultural Supply and Demand Estimates
