= 1928 United States House of Representatives elections =

House elections for the 71st U.S. Congress

- September 10 and November 6, 1928 (Note: Regulars only, not including specials)

All 435 seats in the United States House of Representatives 218 seats needed for a majority
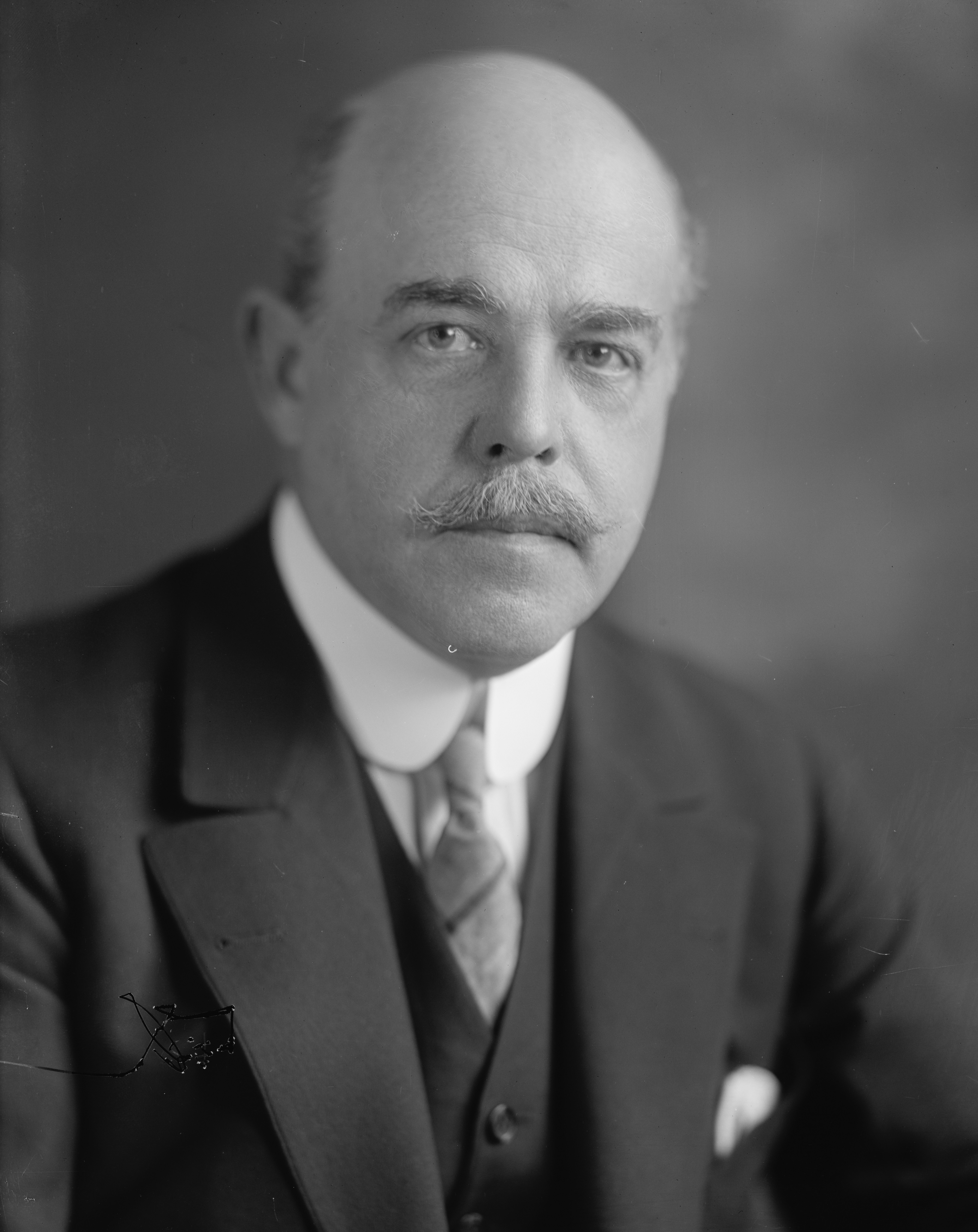

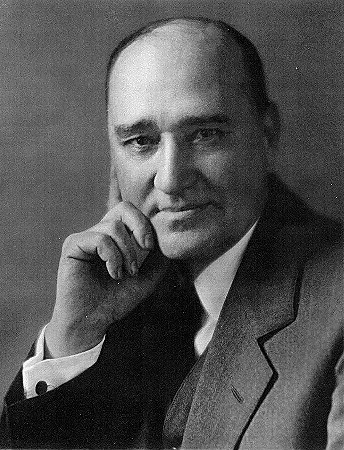
	Majority party	Minority party
Leader	Nicholas Longworth	Finis J. Garrett (did not seek reelection)
Party	Republican	Democratic
Leader since	March 4, 1923	March 4, 1923
Leader's seat	Ohio 1st	Tennessee 9th
Last election	238 seats	194 seats
Seats won	270	164
Seat change	▲32	▼30
Popular vote	19,266,641	14,253,858
Percentage	56.73%	41.97%
Swing	▼0.38pp	▲1.88pp
	Third party	Fourth party
Party	Farmer–Labor	Socialist
Last election	2 seats	1 seat
Seats won	1	0
Seat change	▼1	▼1
Popular vote	190,499	227,164
Percentage	0.56%	0.67%
Swing	▼0.54pp	▼0.23pp
- Results: Republican gain Democratic gain Republican hold Democratic hold Farmer–Labor hold
Speaker before election
Nicholas Longworth
Republican
Elected Speaker
Nicholas Longworth
Republican

The 1928 United States House of Representatives elections were elections for the United States House of Representatives to elect members to serve in the 71st United States Congress. They were held for the most part on November 6, 1928, while Maine held theirs on September 10. They coincided with the election of President Herbert Hoover.

The strength of the U.S. economy resulted in Hoover's Republican Party victory in the election, helping them to scoop up 32 House seats, almost all from the opposition Democratic Party, thus increasing their majority. The big business-supported wing of the Republican Party continued to cement control. Republican gains proved even larger than anticipated during this election cycle, as an internal party feud over the Prohibition issue weakened Democratic standing. Losses of several rural, Protestant Democratic seats can be somewhat linked to anti-Catholic sentiments directed toward the party's presidential candidate, Al Smith.

However, this was the last time the Republicans won a House majority until 1946, and the last time a Republican House was re-elected until 1996. This is the last time that Republicans won the House popular vote by double-digits.

== Results summary ==
↓
164	1	270
Democratic	(Note: 1 Farmer-Labor member was elected)	Republican

Source: Election Statistics - Office of the Clerk

House seats
Democratic	37.70%
Farmer–Labor	0.23%
Republican	62.07%

Results shaded according to winners share of the vote

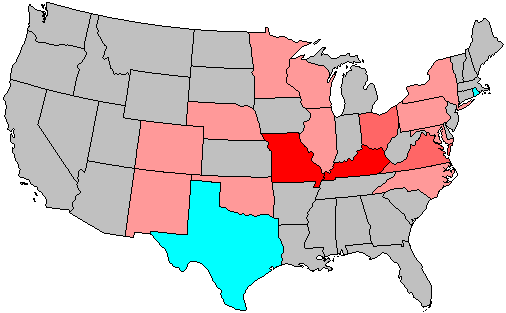
Changes in seats: 6+ Democratic gain / 6+ Republican gain; 3-5 Democratic gain / 3-5 Republican gain; 1-2 Democratic gain / 1-2 Republican gain; no net change

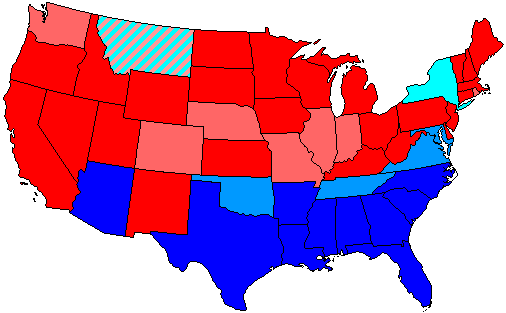
House seats by party holding plurality in state: 80+% Democratic / 80+% Republican; 60+ to 80% Democratic / 60+ to 80% Republican; up to 60% Democratic / up to 60% Republican

== Special elections ==
In these special elections, the winner was elected during 1928; ordered by election date, then by district.

District	Incumbent			This race	
District	Member	Party	First elected	Results	Candidates
Iowa 9	William R. Green	Republican	1911 (special)	Incumbent resigned March 31, 1928, after being appointed to the U.S. Court of Claims. New member elected June 4, 1928. Republican hold. Winner later lost election to the next term; see below.	▌ ✓ Earl W. Vincent (Republican) 73.50%; ▌W. J. Burke (Democratic) 26.50%
Alabama 5	William B. Bowling	Democratic	1920	Incumbent resigned August 16, 1928, after being appointed judge of the 5th Judicial Circuit of Alabama. New member elected November 6, 1928. Democratic hold. Winner also elected to the next term; see below.	▌ ✓ LaFayette L. Patterson (Democratic); Uncontested
Massachusetts 12	James A. Gallivan	Democratic	1914	Incumbent died April 3, 1928. New member elected November 6, 1928. Democratic hold. Winner also elected to the next term; see below.	▌ ✓ John W. McCormack (Democratic) 76.51%; ▌Herbert W. Burr (Republican) 23.49%
Massachusetts 14	Louis A. Frothingham	Republican	1920	Incumbent died August 23, 1928. New member elected November 6, 1928. Republican hold. Winner also elected to the next term; see below.	▌ ✓ Richard B. Wigglesworth (Republican) 61.38%; ▌Christopher M. Clifford (Democratic) 38.62%
New York 32	Thaddeus C. Sweet	Republican	1923 (special)	Incumbent died May 1, 1928. New member elected November 6, 1928. Republican hold. Winner also elected to the next term; see below.	▌ ✓ Francis D. Culkin (Republican) 67.4%; ▌Frank Browman (Democratic) 31.5%; ▌James A. Manson (Socialist) 1.16%
Oregon 2	Nicholas J. Sinnott	Republican	1912	Incumbent resigned May 31, 1928, after being appointed to the U.S. Court of Claims. New member elected November 6, 1928. Republican hold. Winner also elected to the next term; see below.	▌ ✓ Robert R. Butler (Republican) 55.65%; ▌Walter M. Pierce (Democratic) 42.63%; ▌Walter C. Cundell (Socialist Labor) 1.72%
Pennsylvania 8	Thomas S. Butler	Republican	1896	Incumbent died May 26, 1928. New member elected November 6, 1928. Republican hold. Winner also elected to the next term; see below.	▌ ✓ James Wolfenden (Republican) 97.8%; ▌Walter L. Moore (Prohibition) 2.17%

== Alabama ==
District	Incumbent			This race	
District	Member	Party	First elected	Results	Candidates
Alabama 1	John McDuffie	Democratic	1918	Incumbent re-elected.	▌ ✓ John McDuffie (Democratic); Uncontested
Alabama 2	J. Lister Hill	Democratic	1923 (special)	Incumbent re-elected.	▌ ✓ J. Lister Hill (Democratic); Uncontested
Alabama 3	Henry B. Steagall	Democratic	1914	Incumbent re-elected.	▌ ✓ Henry B. Steagall (Democratic); Uncontested
Alabama 4	Lamar Jeffers	Democratic	1921 (special)	Incumbent re-elected.	▌ ✓ Lamar Jeffers (Democratic) 63.1%; ▌A. B. Baxley (Republican) 36.9%
Alabama 5	William B. Bowling	Democratic	1920	Incumbent resigned August 16, 1928, to become judge of the 5th Judicial Circuit of Alabama. Democratic hold. Winner also elected to finish the term, see above.	▌ ✓ LaFayette L. Patterson (Democratic); Uncontested
Alabama 6	William B. Oliver	Democratic	1914	Incumbent re-elected.	▌ ✓ William B. Oliver (Democratic); Uncontested
Alabama 7	Miles C. Allgood	Democratic	1922	Incumbent re-elected.	▌ ✓ Miles C. Allgood (Democratic) 51.7%; ▌Wallace M. Stone (Republican) 48.3%
Alabama 8	Edward B. Almon	Democratic	1914	Incumbent re-elected.	▌ ✓ Edward B. Almon (Democratic); Uncontested
Alabama 9	George Huddleston	Democratic	1914	Incumbent re-elected.	▌ ✓ George Huddleston (Democratic); Uncontested
Alabama 10	William B. Bankhead	Democratic	1916	Incumbent re-elected.	▌ ✓ William B. Bankhead (Democratic) 58.2%; ▌John A. Posey (Republican) 41.8%

== Arizona ==
Results by county Douglas: 50–60% 60–70% 70–80% 80–90%

District	Incumbent			This race	
District	Member	Party	First elected	Results	Candidates
Arizona at-large	Lewis W. Douglas	Democratic	1926	Incumbent re-elected.	▌ ✓ Lewis W. Douglas (Democratic) 61.5%; ▌Guy Axline (Republican) 38.5%

== Alaska Territory ==
See Non-voting delegates, below.

== Arkansas ==
District	Incumbent			This race	
District	Member	Party	First elected	Results	Candidates
Arkansas 1	William J. Driver	Democratic	1920	Incumbent re-elected.	▌ ✓ William J. Driver (Democratic) 83.9%; ▌S. E. Simonson (Republican) 16.1%
Arkansas 2	William A. Oldfield	Democratic	1908	Incumbent re-elected.	▌ ✓ William A. Oldfield (Democratic) 77.4%; ▌Jim McKamey (Republican) 22.6%
Arkansas 3	John N. Tillman	Democratic	1914	Incumbent retired. Democratic hold.	▌ ✓ Claude Fuller (Democratic) 58.0%; ▌Sam B. Cecil (Republican) 42.0%
Arkansas 4	Otis Wingo	Democratic	1912	Incumbent re-elected.	▌ ✓ Otis Wingo (Democratic) 74.1%; ▌George W. Johnson (Republican) 25.9%
Arkansas 5	Heartsill Ragon	Democratic	1922	Incumbent re-elected.	▌ ✓ Heartsill Ragon (Democratic) 78.2%; ▌Lonzo A. Ross (Republican) 21.8%
Arkansas 6	James B. Reed	Democratic	1923 (special)	Incumbent lost renomination. Democratic hold.	▌ ✓ David Delano Glover (Democratic); Uncontested
Arkansas 7	Tilman B. Parks	Democratic	1920	Incumbent re-elected.	▌ ✓ Tilman B. Parks (Democratic) 81.5%; ▌Pat McNally (Republican) 18.5%

== California ==
District	Incumbent			This race	
District	Member	Party	First elected	Results	Candidates
California 1	Clarence F. Lea	Democratic	1916	Incumbent re-elected.	▌ ✓ Clarence F. Lea (Democratic); Uncontested
California 2	Harry Lane Englebright	Republican	1926	Incumbent re-elected.	▌ ✓ Harry Lane Englebright (Republican); Uncontested
California 3	Charles F. Curry	Republican	1912	Incumbent re-elected.	▌ ✓ Charles F. Curry (Republican); Uncontested
California 4	Florence Prag Kahn	Republican	1925 (special)	Incumbent re-elected.	▌ ✓ Florence Prag Kahn (Republican) 74.9%; ▌Harry W. Hutton (Independent) 25.1%
California 5	Richard J. Welch	Republican	1926	Incumbent re-elected.	▌ ✓ Richard J. Welch (Republican); Uncontested
California 6	Albert E. Carter	Republican	1924	Incumbent re-elected.	▌ ✓ Albert E. Carter (Republican); Uncontested
California 7	Henry E. Barbour	Republican	1918	Incumbent re-elected.	▌ ✓ Henry E. Barbour (Republican); Uncontested
California 8	Arthur M. Free	Republican	1920	Incumbent re-elected.	▌ ✓ Arthur M. Free (Republican) 68.0%; ▌Cecelia C. Casserly (Democratic) 32.0%
California 9	William E. Evans	Republican	1926	Incumbent re-elected.	▌ ✓ William E. Evans (Republican) 77.0%; ▌James B. Ogg (Democratic) 20.2%; ▌Christian Sorenson (Socialist) 2.8%
California 10	Joe Crail	Republican	1926	Incumbent re-elected.	▌ ✓ Joe Crail (Republican) 93.9%; ▌Harry Sherr (Socialist) 6.1%
California 11	Philip D. Swing	Republican	1920	Incumbent re-elected.	▌ ✓ Philip D. Swing (Republican); Uncontested

== Colorado ==
District	Incumbent			This race	
District	Member	Party	First elected	Results	Candidates
Colorado 1	S. Harrison White	Democratic	1927 (special)	Incumbent lost re-election. Republican gain.	▌ ✓ William R. Eaton (Republican) 58.1%; ▌S. Harrison White (Democratic) 41.1%; ▌William R. Dietrich (Workers) 0.9%
Colorado 2	Charles B. Timberlake	Republican	1914	Incumbent re-elected.	▌ ✓ Charles B. Timberlake (Republican) 66.5%; ▌Earl House (Democratic) 33.5%
Colorado 3	Guy U. Hardy	Republican	1918	Incumbent re-elected.	▌ ✓ Guy U. Hardy (Republican) 64.9%; ▌Harry A. McIntyre (Democratic) 35.1%
Colorado 4	Edward T. Taylor	Democratic	1908	Incumbent re-elected.	▌ ✓ Edward T. Taylor (Democratic) 58.8%; ▌William P. Dale (Republican) 41.2%

== Connecticut ==
District	Incumbent			This race	
District	Member	Party	First elected	Results	Candidates
Connecticut 1	E. Hart Fenn	Republican	1920	Incumbent re-elected.	▌ ✓ E. Hart Fenn (Republican) 53.1%; ▌Herman P. Kopplemann (Democratic) 46.2%; ▌Fred M. Mansur (Socialist) 0.5%; ▌Wolfson (Workers) 0.1%
Connecticut 2	Richard P. Freeman	Republican	1914	Incumbent re-elected.	▌ ✓ Richard P. Freeman (Republican) 56.0%; ▌William M. Citron (Democratic) 43.5%; ▌Albert Boardman (Socialist) 0.5%
Connecticut 3	John Q. Tilson	Republican	1914	Incumbent re-elected.	▌ ✓ John Q. Tilson (Republican) 52.3%; ▌Nicholas Moseley (Democratic) 46.9%; ▌Davis (Socialist) 0.7%; ▌Schlossberg (Workers) 0.1%
Connecticut 4	Schuyler Merritt	Republican	1916	Incumbent re-elected.	▌ ✓ Schuyler Merritt (Republican) 56.1%; ▌Anthony Sunderland (Democratic) 43.2%; ▌George R. Moffatt (Socialist) 0.6%; ▌Wofsy (Workers) 0.1%
Connecticut 5	James P. Glynn	Republican	1924	Incumbent re-elected.	▌ ✓ James P. Glynn (Republican) 52.4%; ▌Edward Mascolo (Democratic) 47.6%

== Delaware ==
District	Incumbent			This race	
District	Member	Party	First elected	Results	Candidates
Delaware at-large	Robert G. Houston	Republican	1924	Incumbent re-elected.	▌ ✓ Robert G. Houston (Republican) 63.6%; ▌John M. Richardson (Democratic) 36.4%

== Florida ==
District	Incumbent			This race	
District	Member	Party	First elected	Results	Candidates
Florida 1	Herbert J. Drane	Democratic	1916	Incumbent re-elected.	▌ ✓ Herbert J. Drane (Democratic) 58.4%; ▌Abner B. Brown (Republican) 41.6%
Florida 2	Robert A. Green	Democratic	1924	Incumbent re-elected.	▌ ✓ Robert A. Green (Democratic) 83.9%; ▌Thomas P. Chaires (Republican) 16.1%
Florida 3	Tom Yon	Democratic	1926	Incumbent re-elected.	▌ ✓ Tom Yon (Democratic); Uncontested
Florida 4	William J. Sears	Democratic	1914	Incumbent lost renomination. Democratic hold.	▌ ✓ Ruth Bryan Owen (Democratic) 64.9%; ▌William C. Lawson (Republican) 35.1%

== Georgia ==
District	Incumbent			This race	
District	Member	Party	First elected	Results	Candidates
Georgia 1	Charles Gordon Edwards	Democratic	1924	Incumbent re-elected.	▌ ✓ Charles Gordon Edwards (Democratic); Uncontested
Georgia 2	Edward E. Cox	Democratic	1924	Incumbent re-elected.	▌ ✓ Edward E. Cox (Democratic); Uncontested
Georgia 3	Charles R. Crisp	Democratic	1912	Incumbent re-elected.	▌ ✓ Charles R. Crisp (Democratic); Uncontested
Georgia 4	William C. Wright	Democratic	1918	Incumbent re-elected.	▌ ✓ William C. Wright (Democratic); Uncontested
Georgia 5	Leslie Jasper Steele	Democratic	1926	Incumbent re-elected.	▌ ✓ Leslie Jasper Steele (Democratic); Uncontested
Georgia 6	Samuel Rutherford	Democratic	1924	Incumbent re-elected.	▌ ✓ Samuel Rutherford (Democratic); Uncontested
Georgia 7	Malcolm C. Tarver	Democratic	1926	Incumbent re-elected.	▌ ✓ Malcolm C. Tarver (Democratic); Uncontested
Georgia 8	Charles H. Brand	Democratic	1916	Incumbent re-elected.	▌ ✓ Charles H. Brand (Democratic); Uncontested
Georgia 9	Thomas Montgomery Bell	Democratic	1904	Incumbent re-elected.	▌ ✓ Thomas Montgomery Bell (Democratic); Uncontested
Georgia 10	Carl Vinson	Democratic	1914	Incumbent re-elected.	▌ ✓ Carl Vinson (Democratic); Uncontested
Georgia 11	William C. Lankford	Democratic	1918	Incumbent re-elected.	▌ ✓ William C. Lankford (Democratic); Uncontested
Georgia 12	William W. Larsen	Democratic	1916	Incumbent re-elected.	▌ ✓ William W. Larsen (Democratic); Uncontested

== Hawaii Territory ==
See Non-voting delegates, below.

== Idaho ==
District	Incumbent			This race	
District	Member	Party	First elected	Results	Candidates
Idaho 1	Burton L. French	Republican	1916	Incumbent re-elected.	▌ ✓ Burton L. French (Republican) 68.9%; ▌Joe Tyler (Democratic) 30.0%; ▌Gust Nelson (Socialist) 1.1%
Idaho 2	Addison T. Smith	Republican	1912	Incumbent re-elected.	▌ ✓ Addison T. Smith (Republican) 64.1%; ▌Ralph W. Harding (Democratic) 35.4%; ▌George F. Hibner (Socialist) 0.4%

== Illinois ==
District	Incumbent			This race	
District	Member	Party	First elected	Results	Candidates
Illinois 1	Martin B. Madden	Republican	1904	Incumbent died April 27, 1928. Republican hold.	▌ ✓ Oscar Stanton De Priest (Republican) 47.8%; ▌Harry Baker (Democratic) 40.3%; ▌William Harrison (Independent) 11.4%; ▌Benjamin M. Clayton (Independent) 0.2%; ▌Edward L. Doty (Independent) 0.2%
Illinois 2	Morton D. Hull	Republican	1923 (special)	Incumbent re-elected.	▌ ✓ Morton D. Hull (Republican) 62.1%; ▌Michael C. Walsh (Democratic) 37.9%
Illinois 3	Elliott W. Sproul	Republican	1920	Incumbent re-elected.	▌ ✓ Elliott W. Sproul (Republican) 51.4%; ▌Henry P. Bergen (Democratic) 48.6%
Illinois 4	Thomas A. Doyle	Democratic	1923 (special)	Incumbent re-elected.	▌ ✓ Thomas A. Doyle (Democratic) 64.3%; ▌Frank G. Zelezinski (Republican) 35.7%
Illinois 5	Adolph J. Sabath	Democratic	1906	Incumbent re-elected.	▌ ✓ Adolph J. Sabath (Democratic) 69.8%; ▌Edward J. Gates (Republican) 29.9%; ▌Felix Hanzl (Independent) 0.3%
Illinois 6	James T. Igoe	Democratic	1926	Incumbent re-elected.	▌ ✓ James T. Igoe (Democratic) 60.3%; ▌Samuel L. Golan (Republican) 39.7%
Illinois 7	M. Alfred Michaelson	Republican	1920	Incumbent re-elected.	▌ ✓ M. Alfred Michaelson (Republican) 57.8%; ▌Emil Selten (Democratic) 42.2%
Illinois 8	Stanley H. Kunz	Democratic	1920	Incumbent re-elected.	▌ ✓ Stanley H. Kunz (Democratic) 70.8%; ▌Edward Walz (Republican) 29.2%
Illinois 9	Frederick A. Britten	Republican	1912	Incumbent re-elected.	▌ ✓ Frederick A. Britten (Republican) 62.0%; ▌James T. McDermott (Democratic) 37.8%; ▌Edward Hirschler (Independent) 0.2%
Illinois 10	Carl R. Chindblom	Republican	1918	Incumbent re-elected.	▌ ✓ Carl R. Chindblom (Republican) 62.6%; ▌Joseph A. Weber (Democratic) 37.4%
Illinois 11	Frank R. Reid	Republican	1922	Incumbent re-elected.	▌ ✓ Frank R. Reid (Republican) 68.9%; ▌Edwin L. Wilson (Democratic) 31.1%
Illinois 12	John T. Buckbee	Republican	1926	Incumbent re-elected.	▌ ✓ John T. Buckbee (Republican) 73.8%; ▌Jules Vallatt (Democratic) 26.2%
Illinois 13	William Richard Johnson	Republican	1924	Incumbent re-elected.	▌ ✓ William Richard Johnson (Republican) 73.7%; ▌William G. Curtis (Democratic) 26.2%; ▌John Nagle (Ind. Republican) 0.1%
Illinois 14	John Clayton Allen	Republican	1924	Incumbent re-elected.	▌ ✓ John Clayton Allen (Republican) 64.3%; ▌William H. Hartzell (Democratic) 35.7%
Illinois 15	Edward John King	Republican	1914	Incumbent re-elected.	▌ ✓ Edward John King (Republican) 64.2%; ▌James H. Andrews (Democratic) 35.8%; ▌James Martin (Independent Republican) 0.1%
Illinois 16	William E. Hull	Republican	1922	Incumbent re-elected.	▌ ✓ William E. Hull (Republican) 61.1%; ▌George H. Rickenberger (Democratic) 38.9%
Illinois 17	Homer W. Hall	Republican	1926	Incumbent re-elected.	▌ ✓ Homer W. Hall (Republican) 65.0%; ▌Frank Gillespie (Democratic) 35.0%
Illinois 18	William P. Holaday	Republican	1922	Incumbent re-elected.	▌ ✓ William P. Holaday (Republican) 62.0%; ▌James H. Elliott (Democratic) 38.0%
Illinois 19	Charles Adkins	Republican	1924	Incumbent re-elected.	▌ ✓ Charles Adkins (Republican) 66.2%; ▌W. W. Reeves (Democratic) 33.8%
Illinois 20	Henry T. Rainey	Democratic	1922	Incumbent re-elected.	▌ ✓ Henry T. Rainey (Democratic) 56.0%; ▌E. T. Hunter (Republican) 43.9%; ▌John T. Wood (Ind. Republican) 0.1%
Illinois 21	J. Earl Major	Democratic	1926	Incumbent lost re-election. Republican gain.	▌ ✓ Frank M. Ramey (Republican) 50.1%; ▌J. Earl Major (Democratic) 49.9%
Illinois 22	Edward M. Irwin	Republican	1924	Incumbent re-elected.	▌ ✓ Edward M. Irwin (Republican) 56.0%; ▌Eugene W. Kreitner (Democratic) 44.0%
Illinois 23	William W. Arnold	Democratic	1922	Incumbent re-elected.	▌ ✓ William W. Arnold (Democratic) 53.9%; ▌C. T. Wade (Republican) 46.1%
Illinois 24	Thomas Sutler Williams	Republican	1914	Incumbent re-elected.	▌ ✓ Thomas Sutler Williams (Republican) 58.4%; ▌Val B. Campbell (Democratic) 41.6%
Illinois 25	Edward E. Denison	Republican	1914	Incumbent re-elected.	▌ ✓ Edward E. Denison (Republican) 54.4%; ▌A. F. Gourley (Democratic) 45.6%
Illinois at-large (2 seats)	Richard Yates Jr.	Republican	1918	Incumbent re-elected.	Elected on a general ticket: ▌ ✓ Ruth Hanna McCormick (Republican) 30.0%; ▌Richard Yates Jr. (Republican) 29.4%; ▌Charles F. Brown (Democratic) 20.6%; ▌C. D. Joplin (Democratic) 19.5%; ▌Florence Kirkpatrick (Socialist) 0.2%; ▌John E. Mahoney (Socialist) 0.2%; ▌Elizabeth G. Doty (Workers) 0.1%; ▌Frank Gushes (Workers) 0.0%; ▌James S. O'Rourke (Socialist Labor) 0.0%; ▌Thomas Buckley (Socialist Labor) 0.0%
Illinois at-large (2 seats)	Henry Riggs Rathbone	Republican	1922	Incumbent died July 15, 1928. Republican hold.	Elected on a general ticket: ▌ ✓ Ruth Hanna McCormick (Republican) 30.0%; ▌Richard Yates Jr. (Republican) 29.4%; ▌Charles F. Brown (Democratic) 20.6%; ▌C. D. Joplin (Democratic) 19.5%; ▌Florence Kirkpatrick (Socialist) 0.2%; ▌John E. Mahoney (Socialist) 0.2%; ▌Elizabeth G. Doty (Workers) 0.1%; ▌Frank Gushes (Workers) 0.0%; ▌James S. O'Rourke (Socialist Labor) 0.0%; ▌Thomas Buckley (Socialist Labor) 0.0%

== Indiana ==
District	Incumbent			This race	
District	Member	Party	First elected	Results	Candidates
Indiana 1	Harry E. Rowbottom	Republican	1924	Incumbent re-elected.	▌ ✓ Harry E. Rowbottom (Republican) 50.8%; ▌John W. Boehne Jr. (Democratic) 49.2%
Indiana 2	Arthur H. Greenwood	Democratic	1922	Incumbent re-elected.	▌ ✓ Arthur H. Greenwood (Democratic) 50.1%; ▌Orville T. Stout (Republican) 49.1%; ▌Zimri B. Gasten (Socialist) 0.8%
Indiana 3	Frank Gardner	Democratic	1922	Incumbent lost re-election. Republican gain.	▌ ✓ James W. Dunbar (Republican) 51.1%; ▌Frank Gardner (Democratic) 48.9%
Indiana 4	Harry C. Canfield	Democratic	1922	Incumbent re-elected.	▌ ✓ Harry C. Canfield (Democratic) 52.5%; ▌Charles S. Hisey (Republican) 47.5%
Indiana 5	Noble J. Johnson	Republican	1924	Incumbent re-elected.	▌ ✓ Noble J. Johnson (Republican) 56.0%; ▌Henry W. Moore (Democratic) 43.3%; ▌Donald C. Adams (Socialist) 0.6%
Indiana 6	Richard N. Elliott	Republican	1918	Incumbent re-elected.	▌ ✓ Richard N. Elliott (Republican) 57.0%; ▌William Larrabee (Democratic) 43.0%
Indiana 7	Ralph E. Updike	Republican	1924	Incumbent lost re-election. Democratic gain.	▌ ✓ Louis Ludlow (Democratic) 51.5%; ▌Ralph E. Updike (Republican) 48.0%; ▌Edward M. Lentz (Prohibition) 0.5%
Indiana 8	Albert H. Vestal	Republican	1916	Incumbent re-elected.	▌ ✓ Albert H. Vestal (Republican) 58.3%; ▌Don C. Ward (Democratic) 41.7%
Indiana 9	Fred S. Purnell	Republican	1916	Incumbent re-elected.	▌ ✓ Fred S. Purnell (Republican) 57.2%; ▌George L. Mackintosh (Democratic) 42.8%
Indiana 10	William R. Wood	Republican	1914	Incumbent re-elected.	▌ ✓ William R. Wood (Republican) 62.0%; ▌John W. Sobraske (Democratic) 38.0%
Indiana 11	Albert R. Hall	Republican	1924	Incumbent re-elected.	▌ ✓ Albert R. Hall (Republican) 54.1%; ▌M. Clifford Townsend (Democratic) 45.9%
Indiana 12	David Hogg	Republican	1924	Incumbent re-elected.	▌ ✓ David Hogg (Republican) 55.3%; ▌Samuel D. Jackson (Democratic) 44.7%
Indiana 13	Andrew J. Hickey	Republican	1918	Incumbent re-elected.	▌ ✓ Andrew J. Hickey (Republican) 59.8%; ▌Chester A. Perkins (Democratic) 40.2%

== Iowa ==
District	Incumbent			This race	
District	Member	Party	First elected	Results	Candidates
Iowa 1	William F. Kopp	Republican	1920	Incumbent re-elected.	▌ ✓ William F. Kopp (Republican); Uncontested
Iowa 2	F. Dickinson Letts	Republican	1924	Incumbent re-elected.	▌ ✓ F. Dickinson Letts (Republican) 57.1%; ▌Frank C. Titzell (Democratic) 42.9%
Iowa 3	Thomas J. B. Robinson	Republican	1922	Incumbent re-elected.	▌ ✓ Thomas J. B. Robinson (Republican) 60.9%; ▌Leo F. Tierney (Democratic) 39.1%
Iowa 4	Gilbert N. Haugen	Republican	1898	Incumbent re-elected.	▌ ✓ Gilbert N. Haugen (Republican) 61.2%; ▌Erwin Larson (Democratic) 38.8%
Iowa 5	Cyrenus Cole	Republican	1921 (special)	Incumbent re-elected.	▌ ✓ Cyrenus Cole (Republican) 66.2%; ▌Maurice Cahill (Democratic) 33.8%
Iowa 6	C. William Ramseyer	Republican	1914	Incumbent re-elected.	▌ ✓ C. William Ramseyer (Republican) 65.2%; ▌C. Ver Ploeg (Democratic) 34.8%
Iowa 7	Cassius C. Dowell	Republican	1914	Incumbent re-elected.	▌ ✓ Cassius C. Dowell (Republican); Uncontested
Iowa 8	Lloyd Thurston	Republican	1924	Incumbent re-elected.	▌ ✓ Lloyd Thurston (Republican) 60.0%; ▌James Pearson (Democratic) 40.0%
Iowa 9	Earl W. Vincent	Republican	1928 (special)	Incumbent lost renomination. Republican hold.	▌ ✓ Charles Edward Swanson (Republican) 63.2%; ▌W. J. Burke (Democratic) 36.8%
Iowa 10	L. J. Dickinson	Republican	1918	Incumbent re-elected.	▌ ✓ L. J. Dickinson (Republican); Uncontested
Iowa 11	William D. Boies	Republican	1918	Incumbent retired. Republican hold.	▌ ✓ Ed H. Campbell (Republican) 67.9%; ▌George Finch (Democratic) 32.1%

== Kansas ==
District	Incumbent			This race	
District	Member	Party	First elected	Results	Candidates
Kansas 1	Daniel R. Anthony Jr.	Republican	1907 (special)	Incumbent retired. Republican hold.	▌ ✓ William P. Lambertson (Republican) 68.3%; ▌Maurice P. O'Keefe (Democratic) 31.7%
Kansas 2	Ulysses Samuel Guyer	Republican	1926	Incumbent re-elected.	▌ ✓ Ulysses Samuel Guyer (Republican) 70.1%; ▌Lee R. Hettick (Democratic) 29.9%
Kansas 3	William H. Sproul	Republican	1922	Incumbent re-elected.	▌ ✓ William H. Sproul (Republican) 53.4%; ▌Joe E. Gaitskill (Democratic) 46.6%
Kansas 4	Homer Hoch	Republican	1918	Incumbent re-elected.	▌ ✓ Homer Hoch (Republican) 74.2%; ▌C. T. Neihart (Democratic) 25.8%
Kansas 5	James G. Strong	Republican	1918	Incumbent re-elected.	▌ ✓ James G. Strong (Republican) 69.9%; ▌John F. Corder (Democratic) 30.1%
Kansas 6	Hays B. White	Republican	1918	Incumbent retired. Republican hold.	▌ ✓ Charles I. Sparks (Republican) 63.4%; ▌William H. Clark (Democratic) 36.6%
Kansas 7	Clifford R. Hope	Republican	1926	Incumbent re-elected.	▌ ✓ Clifford R. Hope (Republican) 69.5%; ▌W. C. Dickey (Democratic) 30.5%
Kansas 8	William A. Ayres	Democratic	1914; 1920 (lost); 1922	Incumbent re-elected.	▌ ✓ William Augustus Ayres (Democratic) 58.4%; ▌Richard E. Bird (Republican) 41.6%

== Kentucky ==
District	Incumbent			This race	
District	Member	Party	First elected	Results	Candidates
Kentucky 1	William Voris Gregory	Democratic	1926	Incumbent re-elected.	▌ ✓ William Voris Gregory (Democratic) 56.8%; ▌Miller Hughes (Republican) 43.2%
Kentucky 2	David Hayes Kincheloe	Democratic	1914	Incumbent re-elected.	▌ ✓ David Hayes Kincheloe (Democratic) 52.7%; ▌Clark MacDonald (Republican) 47.3%
Kentucky 3	John William Moore	Democratic	1925 (special)	Incumbent lost re-election. Republican gain.	▌ ✓ Charles W. Roark (Republican) 52.8%; ▌John William Moore (Democratic) 47.2%
Kentucky 4	Henry D. Moorman	Democratic	1926	Incumbent lost re-election. Republican gain.	▌ ✓ John D. Craddock (Republican) 53.1%; ▌Henry D. Moorman (Democratic) 46.9%
Kentucky 5	Maurice Thatcher	Republican	1922	Incumbent re-elected.	▌ ✓ Maurice Thatcher (Republican) 60.2%; ▌Arthur Yager (Democratic) 39.8%
Kentucky 6	Orie Solomon Ware	Democratic	1926	Incumbent retired. Republican gain.	▌ ✓ J. Lincoln Newhall (Republican) 53.1%; ▌Brent Spence (Democratic) 46.8%; ▌John J. Thobe (Socialist) 0.1%
Kentucky 7	Virgil Chapman	Democratic	1924	Incumbent lost re-election. Republican gain.	▌ ✓ Robert Blackburn (Republican) 53.5%; ▌Virgil Chapman (Democratic) 46.5%
Kentucky 8	Ralph W. E. Gilbert	Democratic	1920	Incumbent lost re-election. Republican gain.	▌ ✓ Lewis L. Walker (Republican) 52.7%; ▌Ralph W. E. Gilbert (Democratic) 47.3%
Kentucky 9	Fred M. Vinson	Democratic	1924	Incumbent lost re-election. Republican gain.	▌ ✓ Elva R. Kendall (Republican) 52.9%; ▌Fred M. Vinson (Democratic) 47.1%
Kentucky 10	Katherine Langley	Republican	1926	Incumbent re-elected.	▌ ✓ Katherine Langley (Republican) 56.1%; ▌A. J. May (Democratic) 43.9%
Kentucky 11	John M. Robsion	Republican	1918	Incumbent re-elected.	▌ ✓ John M. Robsion (Republican) 79.8%; ▌H. F. Reed (Democratic) 20.2%

== Louisiana ==
District	Incumbent			This race	
District	Member	Party	First elected	Results	Candidates
Louisiana 1	James O'Connor	Democratic	1918	Incumbent re-elected.	▌ ✓ James O'Connor (Democratic); Uncontested
Louisiana 2	James Z. Spearing	Democratic	1924	Incumbent re-elected.	▌ ✓ James Z. Spearing (Democratic) 69.4%; ▌Peter I. J. Fletchinger (Republican) 30.6%
Louisiana 3	Whitmell P. Martin	Democratic	1914	Incumbent re-elected.	▌ ✓ Whitmell P. Martin (Democratic); Uncontested
Louisiana 4	John N. Sandlin	Democratic	1920	Incumbent re-elected.	▌ ✓ John N. Sandlin (Democratic); Uncontested
Louisiana 5	Riley J. Wilson	Democratic	1914	Incumbent re-elected.	▌ ✓ Riley J. Wilson (Democratic); Uncontested
Louisiana 6	Bolivar E. Kemp	Democratic	1924	Incumbent re-elected.	▌ ✓ Bolivar E. Kemp (Democratic); Uncontested
Louisiana 7	René L. De Rouen	Democratic	1927 (special)	Incumbent re-elected.	▌ ✓ René L. De Rouen (Democratic); Uncontested
Louisiana 8	James Benjamin Aswell	Democratic	1912	Incumbent re-elected.	▌ ✓ James Benjamin Aswell (Democratic); Uncontested

== Maine ==
District	Incumbent			This race	
District	Member	Party	First elected	Results	Candidates
Maine 1	Carroll L. Beedy	Republican	1920	Incumbent re-elected.	▌ ✓ Carroll L. Beedy (Republican) 67.7%; ▌Elvington P. Spinney (Democratic) 32.3%
Maine 2	Wallace H. White	Republican	1916	Incumbent re-elected.	▌ ✓ Wallace H. White (Republican) 65.5%; ▌Albert Beliveau (Democratic) 34.5%
Maine 3	John E. Nelson	Republican	1922	Incumbent re-elected.	▌ ✓ John E. Nelson (Republican) 74.6%; ▌S. Curtis C. Ward (Democratic) 25.4%
Maine 4	Ira G. Hersey	Republican	1916	Incumbent lost renomination. Republican hold.	▌ ✓ Donald F. Snow (Republican) 75.0%; ▌Clinton C. Stevens (Democratic) 25.0%

== Maryland ==
District	Incumbent			This race	
District	Member	Party	First elected	Results	Candidates
Maryland 1	T. Alan Goldsborough	Democratic	1920	Incumbent re-elected.	▌ ✓ T. Alan Goldsborough (Democratic) 50.6%; ▌A. Stengle Marine (Republican) 49.4%
Maryland 2	William P. Cole Jr.	Democratic	1926	Incumbent lost re-election. Republican gain.	▌ ✓ Linwood Clark (Republican) 53.3%; ▌William P. Cole Jr. (Democratic) 46.1%; ▌Clarence H. Taylor (Socialist) 0.5%
Maryland 3	Vincent L. Palmisano	Democratic	1926	Incumbent re-elected.	▌ ✓ Vincent L. Palmisano (Democratic) 49.8%; ▌John Philip Hill (Republican) 49.2%; ▌Samuel M. Neistadt (Socialist) 1.0%
Maryland 4	J. Charles Linthicum	Democratic	1910	Incumbent re-elected.	▌ ✓ J. Charles Linthicum (Democratic) 54.5%; ▌John P. Brandau (Republican) 44.8%; ▌Amon F. Anthony (Socialist) 0.7%
Maryland 5	Stephen W. Gambrill	Democratic	1924	Incumbent re-elected.	▌ ✓ Stephen W. Gambrill (Democratic) 51.9%; ▌Oliver Metzerott (Republican) 47.2%; ▌Gustav P. Dill (Socialist) 0.9%
Maryland 6	Frederick N. Zihlman	Republican	1916	Incumbent re-elected.	▌ ✓ Frederick N. Zihlman (Republican) 56.2%; ▌David J. Lewis (Democratic) 43.8%

== Massachusetts ==
District	Incumbent			This race	
District	Member	Party	First elected	Results	Candidates
Massachusetts 1	Allen T. Treadway	Republican	1912	Incumbent re-elected.	▌ ✓ Allen T. Treadway (Republican) 55.7%; ▌Daniel A. Martin (Democratic) 44.3%
Massachusetts 2	Henry L. Bowles	Republican	1925 (special)	Incumbent retired. Republican hold.	▌ ✓ Will Kirk Kaynor (Republican) 54.4%; ▌John D. O'Connor (Democratic) 45.6%
Massachusetts 3	Frank H. Foss	Republican	1924	Incumbent re-elected.	▌ ✓ Frank H. Foss (Republican) 57.1%; ▌Joseph E. Casey (Democratic) 42.9%
Massachusetts 4	George R. Stobbs	Republican	1924	Incumbent re-elected.	▌ ✓ George R. Stobbs (Republican) 54.8%; ▌Freeman M. Saltus (Democratic) 45.2%
Massachusetts 5	Edith Nourse Rogers	Republican	1925 (special)	Incumbent re-elected.	▌ ✓ Edith Nourse Rogers (Republican) 61.1%; ▌Cornelius F. Cronin (Democratic) 38.9%
Massachusetts 6	A. Piatt Andrew	Republican	1921 (special)	Incumbent re-elected.	▌ ✓ A. Piatt Andrew (Republican) 68.2%; ▌George J. Ferguson (Democratic) 31.8%
Massachusetts 7	William P. Connery Jr.	Democratic	1922	Incumbent re-elected.	▌ ✓ William P. Connery Jr. (Democratic); Uncontested
Massachusetts 8	Frederick W. Dallinger	Republican	1926	Incumbent re-elected.	▌ ✓ Frederick W. Dallinger (Republican) 57.2%; ▌James P. Brennan (Democratic) 42.8%
Massachusetts 9	Charles L. Underhill	Republican	1920	Incumbent re-elected.	▌ ✓ Charles L. Underhill (Republican) 50.3%; ▌Arthur D. Healey (Democratic) 49.7%
Massachusetts 10	John J. Douglass	Democratic	1924	Incumbent re-elected.	▌ ✓ John J. Douglass (Democratic) 85.0%; ▌Edward L. Donnelly (Republican) 15.0%
Massachusetts 11	George H. Tinkham	Republican	1914	Incumbent re-elected.	▌ ✓ George H. Tinkham (Republican) 58.4%; ▌Maurice J. Tobin (Democratic) 41.6%
Massachusetts 12	James A. Gallivan	Democratic	1914	Incumbent died April 3, 1928. Democratic hold. Winner also elected to finish the term; see above.	▌ ✓ John W. McCormack (Democratic) 76.3%; ▌Herbert W. Burr (Republican) 23.7%
Massachusetts 13	Robert Luce	Republican	1918	Incumbent re-elected.	▌ ✓ Robert Luce (Republican) 58.2%; ▌Tomas D. Lavelle (Democratic) 41.8%
Massachusetts 14	Louis A. Frothingham	Republican	1920	Incumbent died August 23, 1928. Republican hold. Winner also elected to finish the term; see above.	▌ ✓ Richard B. Wigglesworth (Republican) 61.3%; ▌Christopher M. Clifford (Democratic) 38.7%
Massachusetts 15	Joseph William Martin Jr.	Republican	1924	Incumbent re-elected.	▌ ✓ Joseph W. Martin Jr. (Republican) 56.8%; ▌John F. Trainor (Democratic) 43.2%
Massachusetts 16	Charles L. Gifford	Republican	1922	Incumbent re-elected.	▌ ✓ Charles L. Gifford (Republican) 63.2%; ▌Willard E. Boyden (Democratic) 30.3%; ▌Frank J. Manning (Socialist) 6.6%

== Michigan ==
District	Incumbent			This race	
District	Member	Party	First elected	Results	Candidates
Michigan 1	Robert H. Clancy	Republican	1926	Incumbent re-elected.	▌ ✓ Robert H. Clancy (Republican) 61.5%; ▌William M. Donnelly (Democratic) 38.0%; ▌Axell Londal (Socialist) 0.2%; ▌George J. Koch (Workers) 0.2%; ▌Dimita Pankoff (Socialist Labor) 0.0%
Michigan 2	Earl C. Michener	Republican	1918	Incumbent re-elected.	▌ ✓ Earl C. Michener (Republican) 73.5%; ▌Grover L. Morden (Democratic) 26.5%
Michigan 3	Joseph L. Hooper	Republican	1925 (special)	Incumbent re-elected.	▌ ✓ Joseph L. Hooper (Republican) 79.4%; ▌William L. Fitzgerald (Democratic) 20.6%
Michigan 4	John C. Ketcham	Republican	1920	Incumbent re-elected.	▌ ✓ John C. Ketcham (Republican) 75.4%; ▌Roman I. Jarvis (Democratic) 24.6%
Michigan 5	Carl E. Mapes	Republican	1912	Incumbent re-elected.	▌ ✓ Carl E. Mapes (Republican) 78.8%; ▌Frank C. Jarvis (Democratic) 21.1%; ▌John A. Zeigler (Workers) 0.1%
Michigan 6	Grant M. Hudson	Republican	1922	Incumbent re-elected.	▌ ✓ Grant M. Hudson (Republican) 72.5%; ▌A. Bruce Atwell (Democratic) 27.1%; ▌Milton E. Depew (Socialist) 0.2%; ▌Charles L. Cox (Workers) 0.1%
Michigan 7	Louis C. Cramton	Republican	1912	Incumbent re-elected.	▌ ✓ Louis C. Cramton (Republican) 73.9%; ▌Varnum J. Bowers (Democratic) 26.1%
Michigan 8	Bird J. Vincent	Republican	1922	Incumbent re-elected.	▌ ✓ Bird J. Vincent (Republican) 75.4%; ▌Burnett J. Abbott (Democratic) 24.6%; ▌John G. Zittel (Workers) 0.0%
Michigan 9	James C. McLaughlin	Republican	1906	Incumbent re-elected.	▌ ✓ James C. McLaughlin (Republican) 99.8%; ▌Ray Rector (Workers) 0.2%
Michigan 10	Roy O. Woodruff	Republican	1920	Incumbent re-elected.	▌ ✓ Roy O. Woodruff (Republican) 73.7%; ▌Judson E. Richardson (Democratic) 26.3%
Michigan 11	Frank P. Bohn	Republican	1926	Incumbent re-elected.	▌ ✓ Frank P. Bohn (Republican) 67.2%; ▌Carl R. Henry (Democratic) 32.8%
Michigan 12	W. Frank James	Republican	1914	Incumbent re-elected.	▌ ✓ W. Frank James (Republican) 69.1%; ▌L. A. Barry (Democratic) 30.9%
Michigan 13	Clarence J. McLeod	Republican	1922	Incumbent re-elected.	▌ ✓ Clarence J. McLeod (Republican) 64.9%; ▌John S. Hall (Democratic) 34.6%; ▌William Mollenhauer (Workers) 0.3%; ▌Samuel N. Diamond (Socialist) 0.2%; ▌Joseph K. Horvath (Socialist Labor) 0.1%

== Minnesota ==
District	Incumbent			This race	
District	Member	Party	First elected	Results	Candidates
Minnesota 1	Allen J. Furlow	Republican	1924	Incumbent lost renomination. Republican hold.	▌ ✓ Victor Christgau (Republican) 64.8%; ▌James F. Lynn (Democratic) 35.2%
Minnesota 2	Frank Clague	Republican	1920	Incumbent re-elected.	▌ ✓ Frank Clague (Republican) 69.4%; ▌John A. Cashel (Democratic) 30.6%
Minnesota 3	August H. Andresen	Republican	1924	Incumbent re-elected.	▌ ✓ August H. Andresen (Republican) 58.8%; ▌Charles C. Kolars (Democratic) 22.2%; ▌Henry Arens (Farmer–Labor) 17.6%; ▌Edwin B. Ford (Workers Communist) 1.3%
Minnesota 4	Melvin Maas	Republican	1926	Incumbent re-elected.	▌ ✓ Melvin Maas (Republican) 36.0%; ▌John P. J. Dolan (Democratic) 28.6%; ▌Howard Y. Williams (Farmer–Labor) 21.0%; ▌Fred A. Snyder (Independent) 14.0%; ▌Maurice Powers (Workers Communist) 0.5%
Minnesota 5	Walter Newton	Republican	1918	Incumbent re-elected.	▌ ✓ Walter Newton (Republican) 58.6%; ▌James Robertson (Democratic) 22.9%; ▌Ferdinand Johnson (Farmer–Labor) 18.0%; ▌Orban R. Votaw (Workers Communist) 0.5%
Minnesota 6	Harold Knutson	Republican	1916	Incumbent re-elected.	▌ ✓ Harold Knutson (Republican) 66.3%; ▌John Knutsen (Farmer–Labor) 33.7%
Minnesota 7	Ole J. Kvale	Farmer–Labor	1922	Incumbent re-elected.	▌ ✓ Ole J. Kvale (Farmer–Labor) 66.9%; ▌Lawrence M. Carlson (Republican) 33.1%
Minnesota 8	William L. Carss	Farmer–Labor	1924	Incumbent lost re-election. Republican gain.	▌ ✓ William A. Pittenger (Republican) 44.2%; ▌William L. Carss (Farmer–Labor) 42.9%; ▌Dana C. Reed (Democratic) 9.9%; ▌Thomas Foley (Workers Communist) 3.0%
Minnesota 9	Conrad Selvig	Republican	1926	Incumbent re-elected.	▌ ✓ Conrad Selvig (Republican) 55.2%; ▌Knud Wefald (Farmer–Labor) 44.8%
Minnesota 10	Godfrey G. Goodwin	Republican	1924	Incumbent re-elected.	▌ ✓ Godfrey G. Goodwin (Republican) 56.4%; ▌Charles R. Hedlund (Farmer–Labor) 22.3%; ▌Ernest W. Erickson (Democratic) 21.3%

== Mississippi ==
District	Incumbent			This race	
District	Member	Party	First elected	Results	Candidates
Mississippi 1	John E. Rankin	Democratic	1920	Incumbent re-elected.	▌ ✓ John E. Rankin (Democratic); Uncontested
Mississippi 2	Bill G. Lowrey	Democratic	1920	Incumbent lost renomination. Democratic hold.	▌ ✓ Wall Doxey (Democratic); Uncontested
Mississippi 3	William Madison Whittington	Democratic	1924	Incumbent re-elected.	▌ ✓ William Madison Whittington (Democratic); Uncontested
Mississippi 4	Jeff Busby	Democratic	1922	Incumbent re-elected.	▌ ✓ Jeff Busby (Democratic); Uncontested
Mississippi 5	Ross A. Collins	Democratic	1920	Incumbent re-elected.	▌ ✓ Ross A. Collins (Democratic); Uncontested
Mississippi 6	T. Webber Wilson	Democratic	1922	Incumbent retired to run for U. S. Senate. Democratic hold.	▌ ✓ Robert S. Hall (Democratic); Uncontested
Mississippi 7	Percy E. Quin	Democratic	1912	Incumbent re-elected.	▌ ✓ Percy E. Quin (Democratic); Uncontested
Mississippi 8	James W. Collier	Democratic	1908	Incumbent re-elected.	▌ ✓ James W. Collier (Democratic); Uncontested

== Missouri ==
District	Incumbent			This race	
District	Member	Party	First elected	Results	Candidates
Missouri 1	Milton A. Romjue	Democratic	1922	Incumbent re-elected.	▌ ✓ Milton A. Romjue (Democratic) 52.9%; ▌J. Frank Culler (Republican) 47.1%
Missouri 2	Ralph F. Lozier	Democratic	1922	Incumbent re-elected.	▌ ✓ Ralph F. Lozier (Democratic) 53.2%; ▌Lloyd V. Harmon (Republican) 46.8%
Missouri 3	Jacob L. Milligan	Democratic	1922	Incumbent re-elected.	▌ ✓ Jacob L. Milligan (Democratic) 50.0%; ▌H. F. Lawrence (Republican) 50.0%
Missouri 4	Charles L. Faust	Republican	1920	Incumbent re-elected.	▌ ✓ Charles L. Faust (Republican) 57.1%; ▌Richard M. Duncan (Democratic) 42.9%
Missouri 5	George H. Combs Jr.	Democratic	1926	Incumbent lost re-election. Republican gain.	▌ ✓ Edgar C. Ellis (Republican) 50.5%; ▌George H. Combs Jr. (Democratic) 49.4%; ▌Simon Ommerman (Socialist) 0.1%; ▌Michael L. Hiltner (Socialist Labor) 0.0%
Missouri 6	Clement C. Dickinson	Democratic	1922	Incumbent lost re-election. Republican gain.	▌ ✓ Thomas Jefferson Halsey (Republican) 53.2%; ▌Clement C. Dickinson (Democratic) 46.8%
Missouri 7	Samuel C. Major	Democratic	1922	Incumbent lost re-election. Republican gain.	▌ ✓ John William Palmer (Republican) 58.6%; ▌Samuel C. Major (Democratic) 41.4%
Missouri 8	William L. Nelson	Democratic	1924	Incumbent re-elected.	▌ ✓ William L. Nelson (Democratic) 55.6%; ▌David W. Peters (Republican) 44.4%
Missouri 9	Clarence Cannon	Democratic	1922	Incumbent re-elected.	▌ ✓ Clarence Cannon (Democratic) 54.5%; ▌A. H. Steinbeck (Republican) 45.5%
Missouri 10	Henry F. Niedringhaus	Republican	1926	Incumbent re-elected.	▌ ✓ Henry F. Niedringhaus (Republican) 55.0%; ▌John R. Green (Democratic) 45.0%
Missouri 11	John J. Cochran	Democratic	1926	Incumbent re-elected.	▌ ✓ John J. Cochran (Democratic) 57.4%; ▌William Gray (Republican) 42.6%
Missouri 12	Leonidas C. Dyer	Republican	1914	Incumbent re-elected.	▌ ✓ Leonidas C. Dyer (Republican) 58.4%; ▌Joseph L. McLemore (Democratic) 41.6%
Missouri 13	Clyde Williams	Democratic	1926	Incumbent lost re-election. Republican gain.	▌ ✓ Charles Edward Kiefner (Republican) 50.6%; ▌Clyde Williams (Democratic) 49.4%
Missouri 14	James F. Fulbright	Democratic	1926	Incumbent lost re-election. Republican gain.	▌ ✓ Dewey J. Short (Republican) 53.9%; ▌James F. Fulbright (Democratic) 46.1%
Missouri 15	Joe J. Manlove	Republican	1922	Incumbent re-elected.	▌ ✓ Joe J. Manlove (Republican) 64.6%; ▌George B. Lang (Democratic) 35.4%
Missouri 16	Thomas L. Rubey	Democratic	1922	Incumbent died November 2, 1928. Republican gain.	▌ ✓ Rowland Louis Johnston (Republican) 53.5%; ▌S. A. Cunningham (Democratic) 46.5%

== Montana ==
District	Incumbent			This race	
District	Member	Party	First elected	Results	Candidates
Montana 1	John M. Evans	Democratic	1922	Incumbent re-elected.	▌ ✓ John M. Evans (Democratic) 57.3%; ▌Mark D. Fitzgerald (Republican) 42.1%; ▌P. J. Cavanaugh (Socialist) 0.6%
Montana 2	Scott Leavitt	Republican	1922	Incumbent re-elected.	▌ ✓ Scott Leavitt (Republican) 67.9%; ▌B. A. Taylor (Democratic) 31.8%; ▌Jacob M. Kruse (Socialist) 0.3%

== Nebraska ==
District	Incumbent			This race	
District	Member	Party	First elected	Results	Candidates
Nebraska 1	John H. Morehead	Democratic	1922	Incumbent re-elected.	▌ ✓ John H. Morehead (Democratic) 50.4%; ▌Elmer J. Burkett (Republican) 49.6%
Nebraska 2	Willis G. Sears	Republican	1922	Incumbent re-elected.	▌ ✓ Willis G. Sears (Republican) 56.0%; ▌Harry B. Fleharty (Democratic) 44.0%
Nebraska 3	Edgar Howard	Democratic	1922	Incumbent re-elected.	▌ ✓ Edgar Howard (Democratic) 54.8%; ▌James Nichols (Republican) 45.2%
Nebraska 4	John N. Norton	Democratic	1926	Incumbent lost re-election. Republican gain.	▌ ✓ Charles H. Sloan (Republican) 50.1%; ▌John N. Norton (Democratic) 49.9%
Nebraska 5	Ashton C. Shallenberger	Democratic	1922	Incumbent lost re-election. Republican gain.	▌ ✓ Fred G. Johnson (Republican) 51.1%; ▌Ashton C. Shallenberger (Democratic) 48.9%
Nebraska 6	Robert G. Simmons	Republican	1922	Incumbent re-elected.	▌ ✓ Robert G. Simmons (Republican) 74.3%; ▌John McCoy (Democratic) 25.7%

== Nevada ==
District	Incumbent			This race	
District	Member	Party	First elected	Results	Candidates
Nevada at-large	Samuel S. Arentz	Republican	1924	Incumbent re-elected.	▌ ✓ Samuel S. Arentz (Republican) 58.6%; ▌Charles L. Horsey (Democratic) 41.4%

== New Hampshire ==
District	Incumbent			This race	
District	Member	Party	First elected	Results	Candidates
New Hampshire 1	Fletcher Hale	Republican	1924	Incumbent re-elected.	▌ ✓ Fletcher Hale (Republican) 57.5%; ▌Francis Clyde Keefe (Democratic) 42.4%; ▌Charles W. Greene (Socialist) 0.1%
New Hampshire 2	Edward Hills Wason	Republican	1914	Incumbent re-elected.	▌ ✓ Edward Hills Wason (Republican) 60.0%; ▌George H. Duncan (Democratic) 39.9%; ▌Eli Bourdon (Socialist) 0.1%

== New Jersey ==
District	Incumbent			This race	
District	Member	Party	First elected	Results	Candidates
New Jersey 1	Charles A. Wolverton	Republican	1926	Incumbent re-elected.	▌ ✓ Charles A. Wolverton (Republican) 74.9%; ▌Alfred R. White (Democratic) 25.1%
New Jersey 2	Isaac Bacharach	Republican	1914	Incumbent re-elected.	▌ ✓ Isaac Bacharach (Republican) 76.3%; ▌George R. Greis (Democratic) 23.7%
New Jersey 3	Harold G. Hoffman	Republican	1926	Incumbent re-elected.	▌ ✓ Harold G. Hoffman (Republican) 63.0%; ▌John R. Phillips Jr. (Democratic) 37.0%
New Jersey 4	Charles A. Eaton	Republican	1924	Incumbent re-elected.	▌ ✓ Charles A. Eaton (Republican) 63.6%; ▌Orren Jack Turner (Democratic) 36.4%
New Jersey 5	Ernest R. Ackerman	Republican	1918	Incumbent re-elected.	▌ ✓ Ernest R. Ackerman (Republican) 67.4%; ▌Roswell S. Nichols (Democratic) 32.6%
New Jersey 6	Randolph Perkins	Republican	1920	Incumbent re-elected.	▌ ✓ Randolph Perkins (Republican) 61.7%; ▌Frank L. Sample (Democratic) 38.1%; ▌Henry J. Cox (Socialist) 0.2%
New Jersey 7	George N. Seger	Republican	1922	Incumbent re-elected.	▌ ✓ George N. Seger (Republican) 57.0%; ▌Abram Klenert (Democratic) 42.6%; ▌J. Anthony Novak (Socialist) 0.3%; ▌Harry Santhouse (Socialist Labor) 0.1%
New Jersey 8	Paul J. Moore	Democratic	1926	Incumbent lost re-election. Republican gain.	▌ ✓ Fred A. Hartley Jr. (Republican) 50.1%; ▌Paul J. Moore (Democratic) 49.9%
New Jersey 9	Franklin W. Fort	Republican	1924	Incumbent re-elected.	▌ ✓ Franklin W. Fort (Republican) 56.5%; ▌Francis X. Purcell (Democratic) 43.2%; ▌James M. Reilly (Socialist) 0.2%
New Jersey 10	Frederick R. Lehlbach	Republican	1914	Incumbent re-elected.	▌ ✓ Frederick R. Lehlbach (Republican) 62.1%; ▌Eugene J. O'Mara (Democratic) 37.9%
New Jersey 11	Oscar L. Auf der Heide	Democratic	1924	Incumbent re-elected.	▌ ✓ Oscar L. Auf der Heide (Democratic) 62.1%; ▌George M. Eichler (Republican) 37.9%
New Jersey 12	Mary Teresa Norton	Democratic	1924	Incumbent re-elected.	▌ ✓ Mary Teresa Norton (Democratic) 62.0%; ▌Philip W. Grece (Republican) 38.0%

== New Mexico ==
District	Incumbent			This race	
District	Member	Party	First elected	Results	Candidates
New Mexico at-large	John Morrow	Democratic	1922	Incumbent lost re-election. Republican gain.	▌ ✓ Albert G. Simms (Republican) 52.2%; ▌John Morrow (Democratic) 47.8%

== New York ==
District	Incumbent			This race	
District	Member	Party	First elected	Results	Candidates
New York 1	Robert L. Bacon	Republican	1922	Incumbent re-elected.	▌ ✓ Robert L. Bacon (Republican) 62.0%; ▌Thomas J. Cuff (Democratic) 36.2%; ▌S. W. Christensen (Socialist) 1.9%
New York 2	John J. Kindred	Democratic	1920	Incumbent retired. Democratic hold.	▌ ✓ William F. Brunner (Democratic) 62.4%; ▌Jacob A. Visel (Republican) 35.7%; ▌Barnet Wolff (Socialist) 1.1%; ▌Irving Klein (Independent) 0.6%; ▌Paul Crouch (Independent) 0.2%
New York 3	George W. Lindsay	Democratic	1922	Incumbent re-elected.	▌ ✓ George W. Lindsay (Democratic) 72.2%; ▌Francis J. Nicosia (Republican) 24.8%; ▌Joseph A. Weil (Socialist) 3.0%
New York 4	Thomas H. Cullen	Democratic	1918	Incumbent re-elected.	▌ ✓ Thomas H. Cullen (Democratic) 74.9%; ▌Charles O. Winnie (Republican) 23.2%; ▌Emil Bromberg (Socialist) 1.8%
New York 5	Loring M. Black Jr.	Democratic	1922	Incumbent re-elected.	▌ ✓ Loring M. Black Jr. (Democratic) 56.7%; ▌Robert C. Lee (Republican) 40.6%; ▌Frank Smith (Socialist) 2.7%
New York 6	Andrew Lawrence Somers	Democratic	1924	Incumbent re-elected.	▌ ✓ Andrew Lawrence Somers (Democratic) 53.9%; ▌John L. Lotsch (Republican) 40.8%; ▌Bernard J. Riley (Socialist) 5.3%
New York 7	John F. Quayle	Democratic	1922	Incumbent re-elected.	▌ ✓ John F. Quayle (Democratic) 67.2%; ▌Peter S. Gehris (Republican) 28.7%; ▌James Oneal (Socialist) 4.1%
New York 8	Patrick J. Carley	Democratic	1926	Incumbent re-elected.	▌ ✓ Patrick J. Carley (Democratic) 58.5%; ▌William A. Blank (Republican) 35.8%; ▌William M. Feigenbaum (Socialist) 5.7%
New York 9	David J. O'Connell	Democratic	1922	Incumbent re-elected.	▌ ✓ David J. O'Connell (Democratic) 51.1%; ▌Ernest C. Wagner (Republican) 45.5%; ▌Wilhemus B. Robinson (Socialist) 3.3%
New York 10	Emanuel Celler	Democratic	1922	Incumbent re-elected.	▌ ✓ Emanuel Celler (Democratic) 58.0%; ▌William G. Bushnell (Republican) 34.3%; ▌Abraham I. Shiplacoff (Socialist) 6.8%; ▌Bertram D. Wolfe (Independent) 0.9%
New York 11	Anning S. Prall	Democratic	1923 (special)	Incumbent re-elected.	▌ ✓ Anning S. Prall (Democratic) 66.4%; ▌James A. Simonson (Republican) 32.7%; ▌Walter H. Dearing (Socialist) 0.9%
New York 12	Samuel Dickstein	Democratic	1922	Incumbent re-elected.	▌ ✓ Samuel Dickstein (Democratic) 78.7%; ▌Samuel K. Beier (Republican) 17.3%; ▌Samuel E. Beardsley (Socialist) 4.0%
New York 13	Christopher D. Sullivan	Democratic	1916	Incumbent re-elected.	▌ ✓ Christopher D. Sullivan (Democratic) 77.3%; ▌Jacob Rosenberg (Republican) 19.6%; ▌Hilda G. Claessens (Socialist) 3.0%
New York 14	William I. Sirovich	Democratic	1926	Incumbent re-elected.	▌ ✓ William I. Sirovich (Democratic) 54.4%; ▌Sol Ullman (Republican) 39.2%; ▌August Claessens (Socialist) 5.4%; ▌Alexander Trachtenberg (Independent) 1.0%
New York 15	John J. Boylan	Democratic	1922	Incumbent re-elected.	▌ ✓ John J. Boylan (Democratic) 77.5%; ▌Gabriel L. Kaplan (Republican) 20.8%; ▌Jessie W. Hughan (Socialist) 1.6%
New York 16	John J. O'Connor	Democratic	1923 (special)	Incumbent re-elected.	▌ ✓ John J. O'Connor (Democratic) 68.7%; ▌Michael G. Panzer (Republican) 29.5%; ▌Nathan Fine (Socialist) 1.9%
New York 17	William W. Cohen	Democratic	1926	Incumbent retired. Republican gain.	▌ ✓ Ruth Baker Pratt (Republican) 51.8%; ▌Philip Berholzheimer (Democratic) 45.9%; ▌Bertha Mailly (Socialist) 2.3%
New York 18	John F. Carew	Democratic	1912	Incumbent re-elected.	▌ ✓ John F. Carew (Democratic) 74.0%; ▌Bernard Katzen (Republican) 23.6%; ▌Herman Volk (Socialist) 2.5%
New York 19	Sol Bloom	Democratic	1923 (special)	Incumbent re-elected.	▌ ✓ Sol Bloom (Democratic) 59.4%; ▌David Steinhardt (Republican) 37.8%; ▌Frank R. Crosswaith (Socialist) 2.8%
New York 20	Fiorello La Guardia	Republican	1922	Incumbent re-elected.	▌ ✓ Fiorello La Guardia (Republican) 50.1%; ▌Saul J. Dickheiser (Democratic) 45.5%; ▌Maurice Caspe (Socialist) 3.5%; ▌James P. Cannon (Independent) 0.9%
New York 21	Royal H. Weller	Democratic	1922	Incumbent re-elected.	▌ ✓ Royal H. Weller (Democratic) 53.3%; ▌Edward A. Johnson (Republican) 42.6%; ▌Ethelred Brown (Socialist) 3.8%; ▌Richard B. Moore (Independent) 0.3%
New York 22	Anthony J. Griffin	Democratic	1918	Incumbent re-elected.	▌ ✓ Anthony J. Griffin (Democratic) 71.4%; ▌Thomas J. Burke (Republican) 25.7%; ▌Samuel A. De Witt (Socialist) 2.8%
New York 23	Frank Oliver	Democratic	1922	Incumbent re-elected.	▌ ✓ Frank Oliver (Democratic) 66.6%; ▌Henry H. Spitz (Republican) 27.3%; ▌Morris Gisnet (Socialist) 4.9%; ▌Benjamin Gold (Independent) 1.2%
New York 24	James M. Fitzpatrick	Democratic	1926	Incumbent re-elected.	▌ ✓ James M. Fitzpatrick (Democratic) 54.2%; ▌Benjamin L. Fairchild (Republican) 40.6%; ▌Louis Painken (Socialist) 5.2%
New York 25	J. Mayhew Wainwright	Republican	1922	Incumbent re-elected.	▌ ✓ J. Mayhew Wainwright (Republican) 59.9%; ▌Herbert McKennis (Democratic) 38.3%; ▌John Hagerty (Socialist) 1.8%
New York 26	Hamilton Fish Jr.	Republican	1920	Incumbent re-elected.	▌ ✓ Hamilton Fish Jr. (Republican) 63.6%; ▌George C. Rogers (Democratic) 33.5%; ▌Albert J. Brower (Socialist) 2.9%
New York 27	Harcourt J. Pratt	Republican	1924	Incumbent re-elected.	▌ ✓ Harcourt J. Pratt (Republican) 62.8%; ▌Robert R. Livingston (Democratic) 37.2%
New York 28	Parker Corning	Democratic	1922	Incumbent re-elected.	▌ ✓ Parker Corning (Democratic) 58.2%; ▌Franklin D. Sargent (Republican) 40.1%; ▌Allen Depew (Socialist) 1.7%
New York 29	James S. Parker	Republican	1912	Incumbent re-elected.	▌ ✓ James S. Parker (Republican) 62.8%; ▌Theodore A. Knapp (Democratic) 35.7%; ▌D. V. Linehan (Socialist) 1.5%
New York 30	Frank Crowther	Republican	1918	Incumbent re-elected.	▌ ✓ Frank Crowther (Republican) 59.8%; ▌E. Watson Gardiner (Democratic) 38.1%; ▌Charles W. Noonan (Socialist) 2.1%
New York 31	Bertrand Snell	Republican	1915 (special)	Incumbent re-elected.	▌ ✓ Bertrand Snell (Republican) 63.3%; ▌John C. Howard (Democratic) 36.7%
New York 32	Thaddeus C. Sweet	Republican	1923 (special)	Incumbent died May 1, 1928. Republican hold. Winner also elected to finish the term; see above.	▌ ✓ Francis D. Culkin (Republican) 67.5%; ▌Frank Browman (Democratic) 31.3%; ▌James A. Manson (Socialist) 1.2%
New York 33	Frederick M. Davenport	Republican	1924	Incumbent re-elected.	▌ ✓ Frederick M. Davenport (Republican) 56.5%; ▌Fred Sisson (Democratic) 43.5%
New York 34	John D. Clarke	Republican	1926	Incumbent re-elected.	▌ ✓ John D. Clarke (Republican) 71.0%; ▌William W. Lampman (Democratic) 29.0%
New York 35	Clarence E. Hancock	Republican	1927 (special)	Incumbent re-elected.	▌ ✓ Clarence E. Hancock (Republican) 61.8%; ▌Augustus C. Stevens (Democratic) 36.2%; ▌Charles E. Wheelock (Socialist) 2.0%
New York 36	John Taber	Republican	1922	Incumbent re-elected.	▌ ✓ John Taber (Republican) 69.1%; ▌Joseph P. Craugh (Democratic) 30.9%
New York 37	Gale H. Stalker	Republican	1922	Incumbent re-elected.	▌ ✓ Gale H. Stalker (Republican) 70.3%; ▌Paul Smith (Democratic) 29.7%
New York 38	Meyer Jacobstein	Democratic	1922	Incumbent retired. Republican gain.	▌ ✓ James L. Whitley (Republican) 36.0%; ▌Charles Stanton (Democratic) 32.7%; ▌William MacFarlane (Independent) 29.2%; ▌Charles Messinger (Socialist) 2.1%
New York 39	Archie D. Sanders	Republican	1916	Incumbent re-elected.	▌ ✓ Archie D. Sanders (Republican) 65.0%; ▌Frank L. Morris (Democratic) 31.9%; ▌George Weber (Socialist) 3.1%
New York 40	S. Wallace Dempsey	Republican	1914	Incumbent re-elected.	▌ ✓ S. Wallace Dempsey (Republican) 65.4%; ▌John M. Powers (Democratic) 30.7%; ▌James Battistoni (Socialist) 3.9%
New York 41	Clarence MacGregor	Republican	1918	Incumbent retired to New York Supreme Court justice. Republican hold.	▌ ✓ Edmund F. Cooke (Republican) 52.7%; ▌Fred C. Fornes (Democratic) 43.7%; ▌Martin B. Heisler (Socialist) 3.6%
New York 42	James M. Mead	Democratic	1918	Incumbent re-elected.	▌ ✓ James M. Mead (Democratic) 58.3%; ▌C. Hamilton Cook (Republican) 41.7%
New York 43	Daniel A. Reed	Republican	1918	Incumbent re-elected.	▌ ✓ Daniel A. Reed (Republican) 76.0%; ▌Arthur E. Towne (Democratic) 24.0%

== North Carolina ==
District	Incumbent			This race	
District	Member	Party	First elected	Results	Candidates
North Carolina 1	Lindsay C. Warren	Democratic	1924	Incumbent re-elected.	▌ ✓ Lindsay C. Warren (Democratic) 76.2%; ▌M. B. Prescott (Republican) 23.8%
North Carolina 2	John H. Kerr	Democratic	1923 (special)	Incumbent re-elected.	▌ ✓ John H. Kerr (Democratic) 88.9%; ▌J. L. Johnston (Republican) 11.1%
North Carolina 3	Charles L. Abernethy	Democratic	1922	Incumbent re-elected.	▌ ✓ Charles L. Abernethy (Democratic) 55.7%; ▌William G. Mebane (Republican) 44.3%
North Carolina 4	Edward W. Pou	Democratic	1900	Incumbent re-elected.	▌ ✓ Edward W. Pou (Democratic) 65.6%; ▌L. L. Wrenn (Republican) 34.4%
North Carolina 5	Charles Manly Stedman	Democratic	1910	Incumbent re-elected.	▌ ✓ Charles Manly Stedman (Democratic) 50.1%; ▌Junius H. Harden (Republican) 49.9%
North Carolina 6	Homer L. Lyon	Democratic	1920	Incumbent retired. Democratic hold.	▌ ✓ J. Bayard Clark (Democratic) 61.4%; ▌Leaman Baggett (Republican) 38.6%
North Carolina 7	William C. Hammer	Democratic	1920	Incumbent re-elected.	▌ ✓ William C. Hammer (Democratic) 51.3%; ▌A. I. Ferree (Republican) 48.7%
North Carolina 8	Robert L. Doughton	Democratic	1910	Incumbent re-elected.	▌ ✓ Robert L. Doughton (Democratic) 50.9%; ▌W. S. Bogle (Republican) 49.1%
North Carolina 9	Alfred L. Bulwinkle	Democratic	1920	Incumbent lost re-election. Republican gain.	▌ ✓ Charles A. Jonas (Republican) 51.6%; ▌Alfred L. Bulwinkle (Democratic) 48.4%
North Carolina 10	Zebulon Weaver	Democratic	1916	Incumbent lost re-election. Republican gain.	▌ ✓ George M. Pritchard (Republican) 50.2%; ▌Zebulon Weaver (Democratic) 49.8%

== North Dakota ==
District	Incumbent			This race	
District	Member	Party	First elected	Results	Candidates
North Dakota 1	Olger B. Burtness	Republican	1920	Incumbent re-elected.	▌ ✓ Olger B. Burtness (Republican) 77.5%; ▌W. S. Hooper (Democratic) 22.5%
North Dakota 2	Thomas Hall	Republican	1924	Incumbent re-elected.	▌ ✓ Thomas Hall (Republican) 61.7%; ▌J. L. Page (Democratic) 38.3%
North Dakota 3	James H. Sinclair	Republican	1918	Incumbent re-elected.	▌ ✓ James H. Sinclair (Republican) 84.8%; ▌Reuben H. Leavitt (Democratic) 15.2%

== Ohio ==
District	Incumbent			This race	
District	Member	Party	First elected	Results	Candidates
Ohio 1	Nicholas Longworth	Republican	1914	Incumbent re-elected.	▌ ✓ Nicholas Longworth (Republican) 61.8%; ▌Arthur Espy (Democratic) 38.2%
Ohio 2	Charles Tatgenhorst Jr.	Republican	1927 (special)	Incumbent retired. Republican hold.	▌ ✓ William E. Hess (Republican) 53.9%; ▌James H. Cleveland (Democratic) 46.1%
Ohio 3	Roy G. Fitzgerald	Republican	1920	Incumbent re-elected.	▌ ✓ Roy G. Fitzgerald (Republican) 64.4%; ▌Frank L. Humphrey (Democratic) 35.6%
Ohio 4	William T. Fitzgerald	Republican	1924	Incumbent retired. Republican hold.	▌ ✓ John L. Cable (Republican) 57.5%; ▌William Klinger (Democratic) 42.5%
Ohio 5	Charles J. Thompson	Republican	1918	Incumbent re-elected.	▌ ✓ Charles J. Thompson (Republican) 53.5%; ▌Frank C. Kniffin (Democratic) 46.5%
Ohio 6	Charles C. Kearns	Republican	1914	Incumbent re-elected.	▌ ✓ Charles C. Kearns (Republican) 56.9%; ▌George D. Nye (Democratic) 43.1%
Ohio 7	Charles Brand	Republican	1922	Incumbent re-elected.	▌ ✓ Charles Brand (Republican) 68.8%; ▌Harry E. Rice (Democratic) 31.2%
Ohio 8	Thomas B. Fletcher	Democratic	1924	Incumbent lost re-election. Republican gain.	▌ ✓ Grant E. Mouser (Republican) 52.2%; ▌Thomas B. Fletcher (Democratic) 47.8%
Ohio 9	William W. Chalmers	Republican	1924	Incumbent re-elected.	▌ ✓ William W. Chalmers (Republican) 61.9%; ▌William P. Clarke (Democratic) 37.9%; ▌Charles V. Stephenson (Workers) 0.1%
Ohio 10	Thomas A. Jenkins	Republican	1924	Incumbent re-elected.	▌ ✓ Thomas A. Jenkins (Republican) 69.9%; ▌Charles E. Poston (Democratic) 30.1%
Ohio 11	Mell G. Underwood	Democratic	1922	Incumbent re-elected.	▌ ✓ Mell G. Underwood (Democratic) 52.8%; ▌Edwin D. Ricketts (Republican) 47.2%
Ohio 12	John C. Speaks	Republican	1920	Incumbent re-elected.	▌ ✓ John C. Speaks (Republican) 62.2%; ▌Carl H. Valentine (Democratic) 37.8%
Ohio 13	James T. Begg	Republican	1918	Incumbent retired. Republican hold.	▌ ✓ Joseph E. Baird (Republican) 61.4%; ▌William C. Martin (Democratic) 38.6%
Ohio 14	Martin L. Davey	Democratic	1922	Incumbent retired to run for U.S. Senate. Republican gain.	▌ ✓ Francis Seiberling (Republican) 64.4%; ▌A. F. O'Neil (Democratic) 35.6%
Ohio 15	C. Ellis Moore	Republican	1918	Incumbent re-elected.	▌ ✓ C. Ellis Moore (Republican) 65.8%; ▌Frank H. Ward (Democratic) 34.2%
Ohio 16	John McSweeney	Democratic	1922	Incumbent lost re-election. Republican gain.	▌ ✓ Charles B. McClintock (Republican) 56.3%; ▌John McSweeney (Democratic) 42.5%; ▌Jacob Coxey (Independent) 1.1%; ▌Carl Guillod (Workers) 0.1%
Ohio 17	William M. Morgan	Republican	1920	Incumbent re-elected.	▌ ✓ William M. Morgan (Republican) 58.2%; ▌Charles F. West (Democratic) 41.8%
Ohio 18	B. Frank Murphy	Republican	1918	Incumbent re-elected.	▌ ✓ B. Frank Murphy (Republican) 69.2%; ▌John F. Nolan (Democratic) 30.5%; ▌Frank Sepech (Workers) 0.3%; ▌Jacob S. Coxey (Socialist) 0.0%
Ohio 19	John G. Cooper	Republican	1914	Incumbent re-elected.	▌ ✓ John G. Cooper (Republican) 68.7%; ▌Locke Miller (Democratic) 31.3%
Ohio 20	Charles A. Mooney	Democratic	1922	Incumbent re-elected.	▌ ✓ Charles A. Mooney (Democratic) 62.3%; ▌Oscar V. Hensley (Republican) 37.4%; ▌John Foley (Workers) 0.3%
Ohio 21	Robert Crosser	Democratic	1922	Incumbent re-elected.	▌ ✓ Robert Crosser (Democratic) 59.8%; ▌Joseph F. Lange (Republican) 40.2%
Ohio 22	Theodore E. Burton	Republican	1920	Incumbent retired to run for U.S. Senate. Republican hold.	▌ ✓ Chester C. Bolton (Republican) 69.7%; ▌Simon B. Fitzsimmons (Democratic) 30.3%

== Oklahoma ==
District	Incumbent			This race	
District	Member	Party	First elected	Results	Candidates
Oklahoma 1	Everette B. Howard	Democratic	1926	Incumbent lost re-election. Republican gain.	▌ ✓ Charles O'Connor (Republican) 52.1%; ▌Everette B. Howard (Democratic) 47.6%; ▌Philip J. Dickerson (Socialist) 0.2%
Oklahoma 2	William W. Hastings	Democratic	1922	Incumbent re-elected.	▌ ✓ William W. Hastings (Democratic) 51.9%; ▌E. L. Kirby (Republican) 48.0%; ▌W. W. Moore (Socialist) 0.2%
Oklahoma 3	Wilburn Cartwright	Democratic	1926	Incumbent re-elected.	▌ ✓ Wilburn Cartwright (Democratic) 64.1%; ▌Robert N. Allen (Republican) 35.4%; ▌Robert E. Lee (Socialist) 0.5%
Oklahoma 4	Tom D. McKeown	Democratic	1922	Incumbent re-elected.	▌ ✓ Tom D. McKeown (Democratic) 50.6%; ▌Fred L. Patrick (Republican) 49.1%; ▌L. A. Stanwood (Socialist) 0.3%
Oklahoma 5	Fletcher B. Swank	Democratic	1920	Incumbent lost re-election. Republican gain.	▌ ✓ Ulysses S. Stone (Republican) 50.9%; ▌Fletcher B. Swank (Democratic) 48.7%; ▌Philip Kusler (Socialist) 0.4%
Oklahoma 6	Jed Johnson	Democratic	1926	Incumbent re-elected.	▌ ✓ Jed Johnson (Democratic) 53.4%; ▌Walter C. Stevens (Republican) 46.1%; ▌Joseph T. Dickerson (Socialist) 0.5%
Oklahoma 7	James V. McClintic	Democratic	1914	Incumbent re-elected.	▌ ✓ James V. McClintic (Democratic) 55.6%; ▌Walter S. Mills (Republican) 43.7%; ▌W. L. Russell (Socialist) 0.8%
Oklahoma 8	Milton C. Garber	Republican	1922	Incumbent re-elected.	▌ ✓ Milton C. Garber (Republican) 63.9%; ▌J. P. Battenberg (Democratic) 35.8%; ▌L. Dees (Socialist) 0.4%

== Oregon ==
District	Incumbent			This race	
District	Member	Party	First elected	Results	Candidates
Oregon 1	Willis C. Hawley	Republican	1906	Incumbent re-elected.	▌ ✓ Willis C. Hawley (Republican) 70.9%; ▌Harvey G. Starkweather (Democratic) 26.1%; ▌Upton A. Upton (Socialist Labor) 3.1%
Oregon 2	Nicholas J. Sinnott	Republican	1912	Incumbent resigned May 31, 1928, after being appointed to the U.S. Court of Claims. Republican hold. Winner also elected to finish the term; see above.	▌ ✓ Robert R. Butler (Republican) 55.7%; ▌Walter M. Pierce (Democratic) 42.6%; ▌Walter C. Cundell (Socialist Labor) 1.7%
Oregon 3	Franklin F. Korell	Republican	1927 (special)	Incumbent re-elected.	▌ ✓ Franklin F. Korell (Republican) 67.6%; ▌William C. Culbertson (Democratic) 26.5%; ▌A. D. Berglund (Socialist Labor) 3.2%; ▌Albert Streiff (Independent) 2.7%

== Pennsylvania ==
District	Incumbent			This race	
District	Member	Party	First elected	Results	Candidates
Pennsylvania 1	James M. Beck	Republican	1927 (special)	Incumbent re-elected.	▌ ✓ James M. Beck (Republican) 49.8%; ▌William L. Rooney (Democratic) 49.7%; ▌Charles Mazer (Socialist) 0.3%; ▌Max Hitov (Labor) 0.1%
Pennsylvania 2	George S. Graham	Republican	1912	Incumbent re-elected.	▌ ✓ George S. Graham (Republican) 64.6%; ▌John J. Shanahan (Democratic) 35.1%; ▌Helen Murphy (Socialist) 0.3%; ▌John Griffith (Prohibition) 0.1%
Pennsylvania 3	Harry C. Ransley	Republican	1920	Incumbent re-elected.	▌ ✓ Harry C. Ransley (Republican) 57.4%; ▌James J. Hayes (Democratic) 42.5%; ▌Ellwood Allen (Prohibition) 0.0%
Pennsylvania 4	Benjamin M. Golder	Republican	1924	Incumbent re-elected.	▌ ✓ Benjamin M. Golder (Republican) 61.2%; ▌Thomas J. Carroll (Democratic) 38.1%; ▌Rundolf Freund (Socialist) 0.5%; ▌Miranda J. Bryan (Prohibition) 0.1%
Pennsylvania 5	James J. Connolly	Republican	1920	Incumbent re-elected.	▌ ✓ James J. Connolly (Republican) 99.4%; ▌Frederick Kreckman (Socialist) 0.4%; ▌Steven Stanley (Labor) 0.2%
Pennsylvania 6	George A. Welsh	Republican	1922	Incumbent re-elected.	▌ ✓ George A. Welsh (Republican) 59.8%; ▌Bruce A. Metzger (Democratic) 39.7%; ▌Louis Schorpp (Socialist) 0.4%; ▌M. Jones (Prohibition) 0.1%
Pennsylvania 7	George P. Darrow	Republican	1914	Incumbent re-elected.	▌ ✓ George P. Darrow (Republican) 68.0%; ▌Thomas A. O'Hara (Democratic) 31.5%; ▌Herbert M. Butcher (Socialist) 0.4%; ▌Samuel Wisham (Prohibition) 0.1%; ▌Frank Wozer (Labor) 0.1%
Pennsylvania 8	Thomas S. Butler	Republican	1896	Incumbent died May 26, 1928. Republican hold. Winner also elected to finish the term; see above.	▌ ✓ James Wolfenden (Republican) 76.2%; ▌Henry W. Davis (Democratic) 22.7%; ▌Walter L. Moore (Prohibition) 1.0%; ▌Lillian Bernardi (Labor) 0.1%; ▌Elizabeth A. Brooks (Socialist) 0.0%
Pennsylvania 9	Henry Winfield Watson	Republican	1914	Incumbent re-elected.	▌ ✓ Henry Winfield Watson (Republican) 76.3%; ▌Richard Vaux (Democratic) 23.5%; ▌Joseph Evans (Prohibition) 0.2%
Pennsylvania 10	William Walton Griest	Republican	1908	Incumbent re-elected.	▌ ✓ William Walton Griest (Republican) 83.0%; ▌John A. McSparran (Democratic) 17.0%
Pennsylvania 11	Laurence H. Watres	Republican	1922	Incumbent re-elected.	▌ ✓ Laurence H. Watres (Republican) 50.3%; ▌Frank M. Walsh (Democratic) 49.7%
Pennsylvania 12	John J. Casey	Democratic	1926	Incumbent re-elected.	▌ ✓ John J. Casey (Democratic) 51.6%; ▌Henry W. Merritt (Republican) 48.4%
Pennsylvania 13	Cyrus Maffet Palmer	Republican	1926	Incumbent lost renomination. Republican hold.	▌ ✓ George F. Brumm (Republican) 55.5%; ▌Bernard V. O'Hare (Democratic) 44.5%
Pennsylvania 14	Robert Grey Bushong	Republican	1926	Incumbent retired. Republican hold.	▌ ✓ Charles J. Esterly (Republican) 61.9%; ▌Abraham H. Rothermel (Democratic) 29.2%; ▌Howard McDonough (Socialist Labor) 8.8%
Pennsylvania 15	Louis T. McFadden	Republican	1914	Incumbent re-elected.	▌ ✓ Louis T. McFadden (Republican) 93.8%; ▌Cornelia Bryce Pinchot (Prohibition) 6.2%
Pennsylvania 16	Edgar R. Kiess	Republican	1912	Incumbent re-elected.	▌ ✓ Edgar R. Kiess (Republican) 74.0%; ▌Thomas Wood (Democratic) 25.7%; ▌Edward McGraw (Independent) 0.3%
Pennsylvania 17	Frederick W. Magrady	Republican	1924	Incumbent re-elected.	▌ ✓ Frederick W. Magrady (Republican) 60.0%; ▌Samuel M. Shipman (Democratic) 40.0%
Pennsylvania 18	Edward M. Beers	Republican	1922	Incumbent re-elected.	▌ ✓ Edward M. Beers (Republican) 81.0%; ▌Frederick A. Rupp (Democratic) 19.0%
Pennsylvania 19	Isaac Hoffer Doutrich	Republican	1926	Incumbent re-elected.	▌ ✓ Isaac Hoffer Doutrich (Republican) 80.3%; ▌John E. Blair (Democratic) 19.0%; ▌B. E. P. Prugh (Prohibition) 0.6%
Pennsylvania 20	James Russell Leech	Republican	1926	Incumbent re-elected.	▌ ✓ James Russell Leech (Republican) 53.3%; ▌George E. Wolfe (Democratic) 46.7%
Pennsylvania 21	J. Banks Kurtz	Republican	1922	Incumbent re-elected.	▌ ✓ J. Banks Kurtz (Republican) 76.2%; ▌Harry K. Filler (Democratic) 23.8%
Pennsylvania 22	Franklin Menges	Republican	1924	Incumbent re-elected.	▌ ✓ Franklin Menges (Republican) 63.3%; ▌John H. Myers (Democratic) 36.7%
Pennsylvania 23	James Mitchell Chase	Republican	1926	Incumbent re-elected.	▌ ✓ James Mitchell Chase (Republican) 74.0%; ▌T. E. Costello (Democratic) 26.0%
Pennsylvania 24	Samuel Austin Kendall	Republican	1918	Incumbent re-elected.	▌ ✓ Samuel Austin Kendall (Republican) 64.3%; ▌J. Calvin Core (Democratic) 35.4%; ▌Lervick C. Knight (Democratic) 0.4%
Pennsylvania 25	Henry Wilson Temple	Republican	1912	Incumbent re-elected.	▌ ✓ Henry Wilson Temple (Republican) 59.6%; ▌James S. Pates (Democratic) 39.9%; ▌Adam Getto Jr. (Labor) 0.5%
Pennsylvania 26	J. Howard Swick	Republican	1926	Incumbent re-elected.	▌ ✓ J. Howard Swick (Republican) 72.2%; ▌C. Hale Sipe (Democratic) 27.4%; ▌Peter A. Muselin (Labor) 0.4%
Pennsylvania 27	Nathan Leroy Strong	Republican	1916	Incumbent re-elected.	▌ ✓ Nathan Leroy Strong (Republican) 75.2%; ▌Harry W. Fee (Democratic) 24.8%
Pennsylvania 28	Thomas Cunningham Cochran	Republican	1926	Incumbent re-elected.	▌ ✓ Thomas Cunningham Cochran (Republican) 72.5%; ▌Harry B. Mitchell (Democratic) 27.5%
Pennsylvania 29	Milton W. Shreve	Republican	1918	Incumbent re-elected.	▌ ✓ Milton W. Shreve (Republican) 60.4%; ▌Albert L .Thomas (Democratic) 39.6%
Pennsylvania 30	Everett Kent	Democratic	1926	Incumbent lost re-election. Republican gain.	▌ ✓ William R. Coyle (Republican) 56.9%; ▌Everett Kent (Democratic) 43.1%
Pennsylvania 31	Adam M. Wyant	Republican	1920	Incumbent re-elected.	▌ ✓ Adam M. Wyant (Republican) 95.8%; ▌Harry K. Churns (Socialist) 2.7%; ▌Leon Gaibrish (Labor) 1.5%
Pennsylvania 32	Stephen G. Porter	Republican	1910	Incumbent re-elected.	▌ ✓ Stephen G. Porter (Republican) 64.6%; ▌Edward S. Michalowski (Democratic) 34.6%; ▌John A. Rhea (Prohibition) 0.5%; ▌Anthony Minerich (Labor) 0.3%
Pennsylvania 33	Melville Clyde Kelly	Republican	1916	Incumbent re-elected.	▌ ✓ Melville Clyde Kelly (Republican) 99.0%; ▌J. S. Otis (Labor) 1.0%
Pennsylvania 34	John M. Morin	Republican	1912	Incumbent lost renomination. Republican hold.	▌ ✓ Patrick J. Sullivan (Republican) 97.4%; ▌Hazel K. Gunderman (Prohibition) 1.5%; ▌E. P. Cush (Labor) 1.1%
Pennsylvania 35	Harry A. Estep	Republican	1926	Incumbent re-elected.	▌ ✓ Harry A. Estep (Republican) 57.3%; ▌John J. Murray (Democratic) 41.4%; ▌Anna D. Thompson (Prohibition) 1.0%; ▌Herman Gordon (Labor) 0.3%
Pennsylvania 36	Guy E. Campbell	Republican	1916	Incumbent re-elected.	▌ ✓ Guy E. Campbell (Republican) 60.3%; ▌William E. Madden Jr. (Democratic) 39.0%; ▌James Daley (Labor) 0.8%

== Philippines ==
See Non-voting delegates, below.

== Rhode Island ==
District	Incumbent			This race	
District	Member	Party	First elected	Results	Candidates
Rhode Island 1	Clark Burdick	Republican	1918	Incumbent re-elected.	▌ ✓ Clark Burdick (Republican) 55.5%; ▌John J. Cooney (Democratic) 44.5%
Rhode Island 2	Richard S. Aldrich	Republican	1922	Incumbent re-elected.	▌ ✓ Richard S. Aldrich (Republican) 55.6%; ▌Sumner Mowry (Democratic) 44.4%
Rhode Island 3	Louis Monast	Republican	1926	Incumbent lost re-election. Democratic gain.	▌ ✓ Jeremiah E. O'Connell (Democratic) 57.1%; ▌Louis Monast (Republican) 42.9%

== South Carolina ==
District	Incumbent			This race	
District	Member	Party	First elected	Results	Candidates
South Carolina 1	Thomas S. McMillan	Democratic	1924	Incumbent re-elected.	▌ ✓ Thomas S. McMillan (Democratic); Uncontested
South Carolina 2	Butler B. Hare	Democratic	1924	Incumbent re-elected.	▌ ✓ Butler B. Hare (Democratic); Uncontested
South Carolina 3	Frederick H. Dominick	Democratic	1916	Incumbent re-elected.	▌ ✓ Frederick H. Dominick (Democratic); Uncontested
South Carolina 4	John J. McSwain	Democratic	1920	Incumbent re-elected.	▌ ✓ John J. McSwain (Democratic); Uncontested
South Carolina 5	William Francis Stevenson	Democratic	1917 (special)	Incumbent re-elected.	▌ ✓ William Francis Stevenson (Democratic); Uncontested
South Carolina 6	Allard H. Gasque	Democratic	1922	Incumbent re-elected.	▌ ✓ Allard H. Gasque (Democratic); Uncontested
South Carolina 7	Hampton P. Fulmer	Democratic	1920	Incumbent re-elected.	▌ ✓ Hampton P. Fulmer (Democratic); Uncontested

== South Dakota ==
District	Incumbent			This race	
District	Member	Party	First elected	Results	Candidates
South Dakota 1	Charles A. Christopherson	Republican	1918	Incumbent re-elected.	▌ ✓ Charles A. Christopherson (Republican) 58.4%; ▌A. O. Steensland (Democratic) 40.8%; ▌Frank Hult (Independent) 0.8%
South Dakota 2	Royal C. Johnson	Republican	1914	Incumbent re-elected.	▌ ✓ Royal C. Johnson (Republican) 57.7%; ▌Fred H. Hildebrandt (Democratic) 41.2%; ▌Helge Tangen (Independent) 1.0%
South Dakota 3	William Williamson	Republican	1920	Incumbent re-elected.	▌ ✓ William Williamson (Republican) 56.7%; ▌Arthur W. Watwood (Democratic) 43.3%

== Tennessee ==
District	Incumbent			This race	
District	Member	Party	First elected	Results	Candidates
Tennessee 1	B. Carroll Reece	Republican	1920	Incumbent re-elected.	▌ ✓ B. Carroll Reece (Republican) 78.6%; ▌W. I. Giles (Democratic) 21.4%
Tennessee 2	J. Will Taylor	Republican	1918	Incumbent re-elected.	▌ ✓ J. Will Taylor (Republican) 68.9%; ▌Leon Journolman (Democratic) 31.1%
Tennessee 3	Sam D. McReynolds	Democratic	1922	Incumbent re-elected.	▌ ✓ Sam D. McReynolds (Democratic) 53.4%; ▌Silas Williams (Republican) 46.6%
Tennessee 4	Cordell Hull	Democratic	1922	Incumbent re-elected.	▌ ✓ Cordell Hull (Democratic) 68.2%; ▌Houston Justice (Republican) 31.8%
Tennessee 5	Ewin L. Davis	Democratic	1918	Incumbent re-elected.	▌ ✓ Ewin L. Davis (Democratic) 80.4%; ▌Caplington (Republican) 19.6%
Tennessee 6	Jo Byrns	Democratic	1908	Incumbent re-elected.	▌ ✓ Jo Byrns (Democratic) 79.9%; ▌Edward Bradbury (Republican) 20.1%
Tennessee 7	Edward Everett Eslick	Democratic	1924	Incumbent re-elected.	▌ ✓ Edward Everett Eslick (Democratic) 93.0%; ▌S. E. Stephens (Republican) 7.0%
Tennessee 8	Gordon Browning	Democratic	1922	Incumbent re-elected.	▌ ✓ Gordon Browning (Democratic) 66.0%; ▌Harvey E. Cantrell (Republican) 34.0%
Tennessee 9	Finis J. Garrett	Democratic	1904	Incumbent retired to run for U.S. Senate. Democratic hold.	▌ ✓ Jere Cooper (Democratic) 90.1%; ▌H. C. Murchison (Republican) 9.9%
Tennessee 10	Hubert Fisher	Democratic	1916	Incumbent re-elected.	▌ ✓ Hubert Fisher (Democratic) 81.3%; ▌Harper (Republican) 18.7%

== Texas ==
District	Incumbent			This race	
District	Member	Party	First elected	Results	Candidates
Texas 1	Eugene Black	Democratic	1914	Incumbent lost renomination. Democratic hold.	▌ ✓ Wright Patman (Democratic) 87.9%; ▌Richard F. Stephens (Republican) 12.1%
Texas 2	John C. Box	Democratic	1918	Incumbent re-elected.	▌ ✓ John C. Box (Democratic); Uncontested
Texas 3	Morgan G. Sanders	Democratic	1920	Incumbent re-elected.	▌ ✓ Morgan G. Sanders (Democratic); Uncontested
Texas 4	Sam Rayburn	Democratic	1912	Incumbent re-elected.	▌ ✓ Sam Rayburn (Democratic) 84.2%; ▌Floyd Harry (Republican) 15.8%
Texas 5	Hatton W. Sumners	Democratic	1914	Incumbent re-elected.	▌ ✓ Hatton W. Sumners (Democratic); Uncontested
Texas 6	Luther A. Johnson	Democratic	1922	Incumbent re-elected.	▌ ✓ Luther A. Johnson (Democratic) 90.7%; ▌H. Lee Monroe (Republican) 9.3%
Texas 7	Clay Stone Briggs	Democratic	1918	Incumbent re-elected.	▌ ✓ Clay Stone Briggs (Democratic) 88.4%; ▌A. J. Long (Republican) 11.6%
Texas 8	Daniel E. Garrett	Democratic	1920	Incumbent re-elected.	▌ ✓ Daniel E. Garrett (Democratic) 81.8%; ▌George E. Kepple (Republican) 18.2%
Texas 9	Joseph J. Mansfield	Democratic	1916	Incumbent re-elected.	▌ ✓ Joseph J. Mansfield (Democratic) 86.9%; ▌Louis B. Allen (Republican) 13.1%
Texas 10	James P. Buchanan	Democratic	1912	Incumbent re-elected.	▌ ✓ James P. Buchanan (Democratic) 91.9%; ▌David H. Morris (Republican) 8.1%
Texas 11	Tom Connally	Democratic	1916	Incumbent retired to run for U.S. Senate. Democratic hold.	▌ ✓ Oliver H. Cross (Democratic) 90.9%; ▌R. C. Bush (Republican) 9.1%
Texas 12	Fritz G. Lanham	Democratic	1919 (special)	Incumbent re-elected.	▌ ✓ Fritz G. Lanham (Democratic) 79.6%; ▌David Sutton (Republican) 20.4%
Texas 13	Guinn Williams	Democratic	1922	Incumbent re-elected.	▌ ✓ Guinn Williams (Democratic) 88.5%; ▌P. A. Welty (Republican) 11.5%
Texas 14	Harry M. Wurzbach	Republican	1920	Incumbent lost re-election. Democratic gain.	▌ ✓ Augustus McCloskey (Democratic) 50.3%; ▌Harry M. Wurzbach (Republican) 49.7%
Texas 15	John Nance Garner	Democratic	1902	Incumbent re-elected.	▌ ✓ John Nance Garner (Democratic) 100.0%; ▌J. L. Burd (Independent) 0.0%
Texas 16	Claude Benton Hudspeth	Democratic	1918	Incumbent re-elected.	▌ ✓ Claude Benton Hudspeth (Democratic); Uncontested
Texas 17	Thomas L. Blanton	Democratic	1916	Incumbent retired to run for U.S. Senate. Democratic hold.	▌ ✓ Robert Quincy Lee (Democratic); Uncontested
Texas 18	John Marvin Jones	Democratic	1916	Incumbent re-elected.	▌ ✓ John Marvin Jones (Democratic) 86.5%; ▌V. C. Nelson (Republican) 13.5%

== Utah ==
District	Incumbent			This race	
District	Member	Party	First elected	Results	Candidates
Utah 1	Don B. Colton	Republican	1920	Incumbent re-elected.	▌ ✓ Don B. Colton (Republican) 60.9%; ▌Know Patterson (Democratic) 38.6%; ▌John O. Watters (Socialist) 0.5%
Utah 2	Elmer O. Leatherwood	Republican	1920	Incumbent re-elected.	▌ ✓ Elmer O. Leatherwood (Republican) 50.2%; ▌Joshua H. Paul (Democratic) 49.3%; ▌T. F. Eynon (Socialist) 0.5%

== Vermont ==
District	Incumbent			This race	
District	Member	Party	First elected	Results	Candidates
Vermont 1	Elbert S. Brigham	Republican	1924	Incumbent re-elected.	▌ ✓ Elbert S. Brigham (Republican) 63.0%; ▌Jeremiah C. Durick (Democratic) 35.9%; ▌W. Archer (Prohibition) 1.1%
Vermont 2	Ernest W. Gibson	Republican	1923 (special)	Incumbent re-elected.	▌ ✓ Ernest W. Gibson (Republican) 79.3%; ▌Harry W. Witters (Democratic) 19.1%; ▌Harley W. Kidder (Prohibition) 1.6%

== Virginia ==
District	Incumbent			This race	
District	Member	Party	First elected	Results	Candidates
Virginia 1	S. Otis Bland	Democratic	1918	Incumbent re-elected.	▌ ✓ S. Otis Bland (Democratic); Uncontested
Virginia 2	Joseph T. Deal	Democratic	1920	Incumbent lost re-election. Republican gain.	▌ ✓ Menalcus Lankford (Republican) 55.9%; ▌Joseph T. Deal (Democratic) 44.1%; ▌E .L. Breden (Independent) 0.0%
Virginia 3	Jack Montague	Democratic	1912	Incumbent re-elected.	▌ ✓ Jack Montague (Democratic) 75.9%; ▌J. D. Peake (Independent) 19.0%; ▌James E. Maynard (Independent) 5.1%; ▌Henry W. Anderson (Independent) 0.0%
Virginia 4	Patrick H. Drewry	Democratic	1920	Incumbent re-elected.	▌ ✓ Patrick H. Drewry (Democratic); Uncontested
Virginia 5	Joseph Whitehead	Democratic	1924	Incumbent re-elected.	▌ ✓ Joseph Whitehead (Democratic) 54.3%; ▌Taylor G. Vaughan (Republican) 45.7%; ▌Cabell Staples (Independent) 0.0%
Virginia 6	Clifton A. Woodrum	Democratic	1922	Incumbent re-elected.	▌ ✓ Clifton A. Woodrum (Democratic); Uncontested
Virginia 7	Thomas W. Harrison	Democratic	1916	Incumbent lost re-election. Republican gain.	▌ ✓ Jacob A. Garber (Republican) 50.4%; ▌Thomas W. Harrison (Democratic) 49.6%; ▌H. B. McCormac (Independent) 0.0%; ▌Dabney C. Harrison (Independent) 0.0%
Virginia 8	R. Walton Moore	Democratic	1919 (special)	Incumbent re-elected.	▌ ✓ R. Walton Moore (Democratic); Uncontested
Virginia 9	George C. Peery	Democratic	1922	Incumbent retired. Republican gain.	▌ ✓ Joseph Crockett Shaffer (Republican) 50.8%; ▌W. H. Rouse (Democratic) 49.2%
Virginia 10	Henry St. George Tucker III	Democratic	1922	Incumbent re-elected.	▌ ✓ Henry St. George Tucker III (Democratic) 56.9%; ▌M. J. Putnam (Republican) 43.1%; ▌Aubrey E. Strode (Independent) 0.0%; ▌Grat Crawford (Independent) 0.0%

== Washington ==
District	Incumbent			This race	
District	Member	Party	First elected	Results	Candidates
Washington 1	John Franklin Miller	Republican	1916	Incumbent re-elected.	▌ ✓ John Franklin Miller (Republican) 65.5%; ▌Hugh Todd (Democratic) 34.1%; ▌Ruby Herman (Socialist) 0.4%
Washington 2	Lindley H. Hadley	Republican	1914	Incumbent re-elected.	▌ ✓ Lindley H. Hadley (Republican) 99.3%; ▌August Toellner (Independent) 0.7%
Washington 3	Albert Johnson	Republican	1912	Incumbent re-elected.	▌ ✓ Albert Johnson (Republican) 69.9%; ▌O. M. Nelson (Democratic) 30.1%
Washington 4	John W. Summers	Republican	1918	Incumbent re-elected.	▌ ✓ John W. Summers (Republican) 77.1%; ▌H. C. Bohlke (Independent) 22.9%
Washington 5	Samuel B. Hill	Democratic	1923 (special)	Incumbent re-elected.	▌ ✓ Samuel B. Hill (Democratic) 58.5%; ▌Thomas Corkery (Republican) 41.5%

== West Virginia ==
District	Incumbent			This race	
District	Member	Party	First elected	Results	Candidates
West Virginia 1	Carl G. Bachmann	Republican	1924	Incumbent re-elected.	▌ ✓ Carl G. Bachmann (Republican) 60.6%; ▌Paul R. Wellman (Democratic) 39.4%
West Virginia 2	Frank L. Bowman	Republican	1924	Incumbent re-elected.	▌ ✓ Frank L. Bowman (Republican) 55.7%; ▌Ben H. Hiner (Democratic) 44.2%; ▌Frank Chalfont (Socialist) 0.1%
West Virginia 3	William S. O'Brien	Democratic	1926	Incumbent lost re-election. Republican gain.	▌ ✓ John M. Wolverton (Republican) 50.4%; ▌William S. O'Brien (Democratic) 49.6%
West Virginia 4	James A. Hughes	Republican	1926	Incumbent re-elected.	▌ ✓ James A. Hughes (Republican) 57.0%; ▌H. H. Darnell (Democratic) 43.0%
West Virginia 5	James F. Strother	Republican	1924	Incumbent retired. Republican hold.	▌ ✓ Hugh Ike Shott (Republican) 53.4%; ▌John Kee (Democratic) 46.6%
West Virginia 6	Edward T. England	Republican	1926	Incumbent lost re-election. Democratic gain.	▌ ✓ Joe L. Smith (Democratic) 50.1%; ▌Edward T. England (Republican) 49.9%

== Wisconsin ==
District	Incumbent			This race	
District	Member	Party	First elected	Results	Candidates
Wisconsin 1	Henry A. Cooper	Republican	1920	Incumbent re-elected.	▌ ✓ Henry A. Cooper (Republican) 80.2%; ▌William C. Kiernan (Democratic) 19.8%
Wisconsin 2	Charles A. Kading	Republican	1926	Incumbent re-elected.	▌ ✓ Charles A. Kading (Republican) 69.9%; ▌Eugene A. Clifford (Democratic) 30.1%
Wisconsin 3	John M. Nelson	Republican	1920	Incumbent re-elected.	▌ ✓ John M. Nelson (Republican) 74.7%; ▌William Victora (Democratic) 24.1%; ▌Thomas Dobson (Prohibition) 1.2%
Wisconsin 4	John C. Schafer	Republican	1922	Incumbent re-elected.	▌ ✓ John C. Schafer (Republican) 44.1%; ▌William J. Kershaw (Democratic) 33.9%; ▌Walter Polakowski (Social-Democratic) 22.1%
Wisconsin 5	Victor L. Berger	Social-Democratic	1922	Incumbent lost re-election. Republican gain.	▌ ✓ William H. Stafford (Republican) 38.9%; ▌Victor L. Berger (Social-Democratic) 38.2%; ▌Thomas O'Malley (Democratic) 22.7%; ▌Herbert Friedrichs (Workers) 0.2%
Wisconsin 6	Florian Lampert	Republican	1918	Incumbent re-elected.	▌ ✓ Florian Lampert (Republican) 69.2%; ▌Morley G. Kelly (Democratic) 30.8%
Wisconsin 7	Joseph D. Beck	Republican	1920	Incumbent retired to run for governor. Republican hold.	▌ ✓ Merlin Hull (Republican) 72.4%; ▌A. H. Schubert (Democratic) 27.0%; ▌Arthur H. Shanley (Prohibition) 0.6%
Wisconsin 8	Edward E. Browne	Republican	1912	Incumbent re-elected.	▌ ✓ Edward E. Browne (Republican) 74.0%; ▌R. J. Walsh (Democratic) 25.2%; ▌E. W. Shatto (Prohibition) 0.8%
Wisconsin 9	George J. Schneider	Republican	1922	Incumbent re-elected.	▌ ✓ George J. Schneider (Republican) 60.4%; ▌James H. McGillan (Democratic) 38.5%; ▌Maria I. A. Nelson (Prohibition) 1.1%
Wisconsin 10	James A. Frear	Republican	1912	Incumbent re-elected.	▌ ✓ James A. Frear (Republican) 81.4%; ▌Miles H. McNally (Democratic) 18.6%
Wisconsin 11	Hubert H. Peavey	Republican	1922	Incumbent re-elected.	▌ ✓ Hubert H. Peavey (Republican) 80.8%; ▌Frank P. Kennedy (Democratic) 17.1%; ▌Edwin Kerswill (Prohibition) 2.1%

== Wyoming ==
District	Incumbent			This race	
District	Member	Party	First elected	Results	Candidates
Wyoming at-large	Charles E. Winter	Republican	1922	Incumbent retired to run for U.S. Senate. Republican hold.	▌ ✓ Vincent Carter (Republican) 51.7%; ▌W. S. Kimball (Democratic) 47.8%; ▌R. Nicodemus (Socialist) 0.4%

== Non-voting delegates ==
District	Incumbent			This race	
District	Delegate	Party	First elected	Results	Candidates
Alaska Territory at-large	Daniel Sutherland	Republican	1920	Incumbent re-elected.	▌ ✓ Daniel Sutherland (Republican); [data missing]
Hawaii Territory at-large	Victor S. K. Houston	Republican	1926	Incumbent re-elected.	▌ ✓ Victor S. K. Houston (Republican) 71.67%; ▌Bertram Rivenburgh (Democratic) 28.33%
Philippines at-large 2 seats	Pedro Guevara	Nacionalista	1922	Incumbent re-elected.	▌ ✓ Pedro Guevara (Nacionalista); [data missing]
Philippines at-large 2 seats	Isauro Gabaldón	Nacionalista	1920	Incumbent resigned July 16, 1928. New resident commissioner elected. Nacionalista hold.	▌ ✓ Camilo Osías (Nacionalista); [data missing]

== See also ==
- 1928 United States elections
  - 1928 United States presidential election
  - 1928 United States Senate elections
- 70th United States Congress
- 71st United States Congress
