= Walter I. Smith =

American politician and judge (1862–1922)

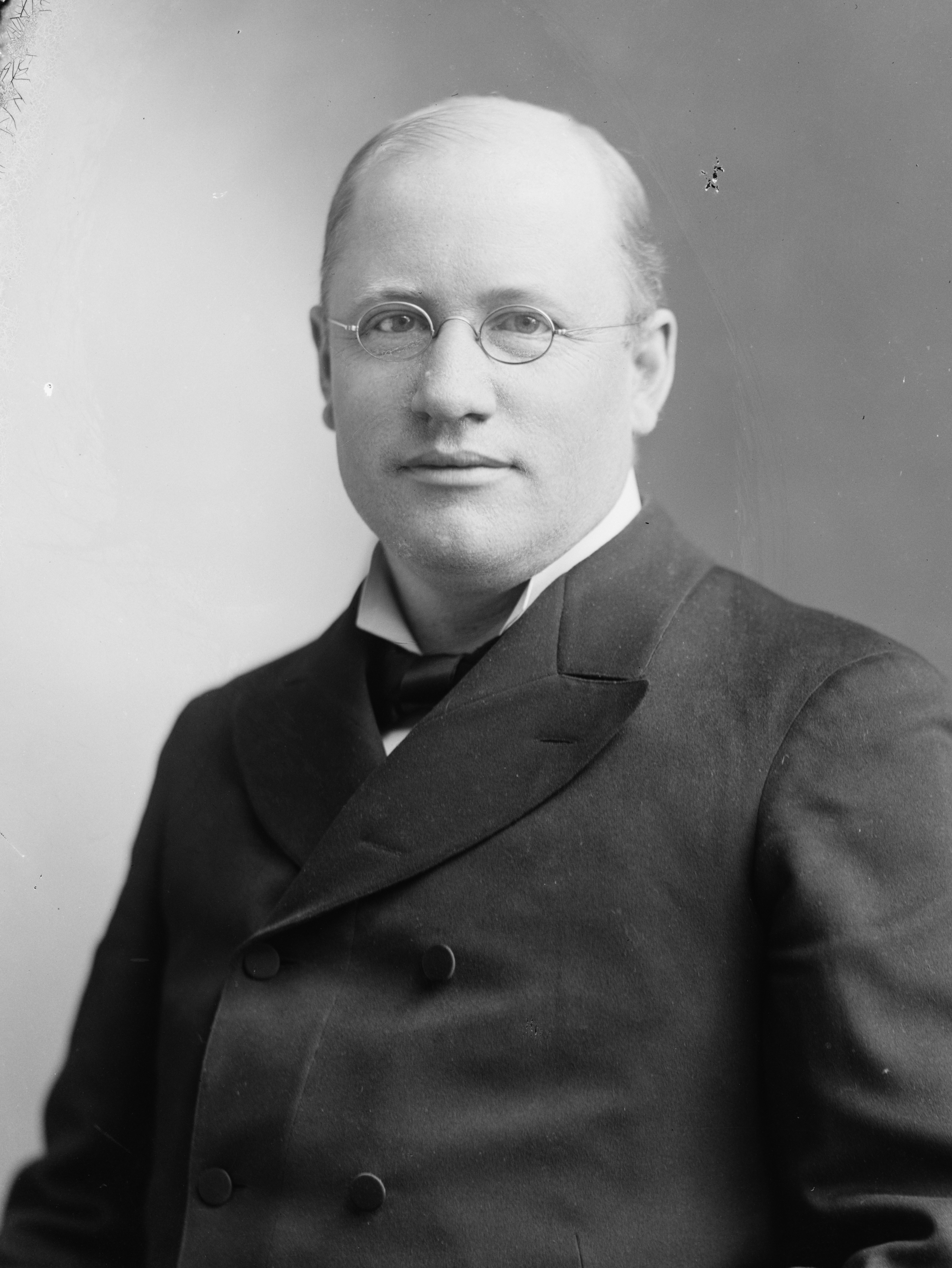

Judge of the United States Court of Appeals for the Eighth Circuit
- In office January 31, 1911 – January 27, 1922
- Appointed by: William Howard Taft
- Preceded by: Willis Van Devanter
- Succeeded by: William S. Kenyon

Judge of the United States Circuit Courts for the Eighth Circuit
- In office January 31, 1911 – December 31, 1911
- Appointed by: William Howard Taft
- Preceded by: Willis Van Devanter
- Succeeded by: Seat abolished

Member of the U.S. House of Representatives from Iowa's 9th district
- In office December 3, 1900 – March 15, 1911
- Preceded by: Smith McPherson
- Succeeded by: William R. Green

Personal details
- Born: Walter Inglewood Smith; July 10, 1862 Council Bluffs, Iowa, U.S.
- Died: January 27, 1922 (aged 59) Council Bluffs, Iowa, U.S.
- Resting place: Fairview Cemetery; Council Bluffs, Iowa
- Party: Republican
- Education: read law

Walter Inglewood Smith (July 10, 1862 – January 27, 1922) was a United States representative from Iowa and a United States circuit judge of the United States Court of Appeals for the Eighth Circuit and the United States Circuit Courts for the Eighth Circuit.

== Education and career ==
Born in Council Bluffs, Pottawattamie County, Iowa, Smith attended the common schools. He read law and was admitted to the bar in 1882 and practiced in Council Bluffs until 1890. He served as Judge of the fifteenth judicial district of Iowa from 1890 to 1900.

== Congressional service ==
Smith was elected as a Republican to the 56th United States Congress to fill the vacancy caused by the resignation of Representative Smith McPherson and on the same day was elected to the 57th United States Congress. He was reelected to the 58th United States Congress and to the four succeeding Congresses and served from December 3, 1900, to March 15, 1911, when he resigned to accept an appointment on the bench.

== Federal judicial service ==
Smith was nominated by President William Howard Taft on January 17, 1911, to a joint seat on the United States Court of Appeals for the Eighth Circuit and the United States Circuit Courts for the Eighth Circuit vacated by Judge Willis Van Devanter. He was confirmed by the United States Senate on January 31, 1911, and received his commission the same day. On December 31, 1911, the Circuit Courts were abolished and he thereafter served only on the Court of Appeals. His service terminated on January 27, 1922, due to his death in Council Bluffs. He was interred in Fairview Cemetery in Council Bluffs.

== Sources ==
- "Walter Inglewood Smith". Biographical Directory of the United States Congress.

U.S. House of Representatives
Preceded by Smith McPherson	Member of the U.S. House of Representatives from Iowa's 9th congressional district 1900–1911	Succeeded by William R. Green
Legal offices
Preceded by Willis Van Devanter	Judge of the United States Circuit Courts for the Eighth Circuit; 1911	Succeeded by Seat abolished
Preceded by Willis Van Devanter	Judge of the United States Court of Appeals for the Eighth Circuit; 1911–1922	Succeeded by William S. Kenyon
