= Iowa's 9th congressional district =

Former congressional district

- Obsolete district
- Created: 1870
- Eliminated: 1940
- Years active: 1873–1943

Iowa's 9th congressional district existed from 1873 to 1943. The district was configured four times, first as part of a nine-district plan, then twice in eleven-district plans, then again in a nine-district plan. In the nine-district plans, the Ninth District encompassed the northwestern corner of Iowa, but in the eleven-district plans it encompassed Council Bluffs and nine surrounding counties.

== Phase one: 1873–1883 ==
Based on the 1870 census, Iowa's U.S. House delegation increased from six to nine members, requiring the Iowa General Assembly to reapportion the districts. Because the northwestern area of the state was relatively less populous, its congressional district (the ninth) was by far the largest, encompassing more than a quarter of the state's 99 counties, and running from the Minnesota border on the north and the Missouri River on the west to Story County, location of the state's geographic center. In this phase, the Ninth District included Hamilton, Story, Boone, Webster, Humboldt, Kossuth, Emmet, Palo Alto, Pocahontas, Calhoun, Greene, Carroll, Sac, Buena Vista, Clay, Dickinson, Osceola, O'Brien, Cherokee, Ida, Crawford, Monona, Woodbury, Plymouth, Sioux, and Lyon counties. It included the growing cities of Sioux City, Fort Dodge, and Ames. During this period, the district was represented by Republicans Jackson Orr of Boone County, S. Addison Oliver of Monona County, and Cyrus Carpenter of Webster County.

== Phase two: 1883 to 1887 ==
The 1880 census caused Iowa to receive two more seats in the House, requiring reapportionment of the state into eleven districts. The former Ninth District in northwestern Iowa was generally divided to create the new 11th and 10th districts. When southwest and south-central Iowa were divided among four districts rather than three, the new Ninth District was created. It included Crawford County (of the old Ninth District) and Harrison, Shelby, Audubon, Pottawattamie, Cass, Mills, Montgomery, and Fremont counties (of the old Eighth District). It included Council Bluffs in Pottawattamie County, across the Missouri River from Omaha, Nebraska and the historical starting point of the transcontinental railroad.

Only two elections were held under this configuration. Voters elected Democrat William Henry Mills Pusey, then replaced him with Republican Joseph Lyman, both of Council Bluffs.

== Phase three: 1887 to 1933 ==
The Iowa General Assembly soon readjusted the boundaries of the eleven-district map, allegedly to increase the number of Republican victories. Those boundaries would remain in place for 45 years. Fremont County was shifted from the Ninth into the Eighth District, thereby setting the stage for the stunning 1886 upset of incumbent Eighth District Republican Congressman William Peters Hepburn by Fremont County's Independent Republican, Albert R. Anderson. Crawford County was added to the Tenth District, and two counties from Iowa's 7th congressional district (Guthrie and Adair) were added to the Ninth.

Lyman retained his seat after reapportionment, and he was followed by Joseph Rea Reed, Thomas Bowman, Alva L. Hager, Smith McPherson, Walter I. Smith, William R. Green, Earl W. Vincent, and Charles Swanson. All were Republican lawyers except Bowman, a Democratic newspaperman. All were from Council Bluffs except Hager (from Adair County), McPherson (from Montgomery County), Green (from Audubon County), and Vincent (from Guthrie County).

The General Assembly's 45-year failure to reapportion congressional districts resulted in malapportionment, which was particularly severe in certain districts in Iowa. Residents of three other southern Iowa districts (the 1st, 6th, and 8th) gained in per capita influence as the districts' population growth slowed or reversed. The 9th district did not decline in political influence as much as districts that were oversized for too long (like the 10th and 11th) and districts with Iowa's largest cities (like the 2nd, 3rd and 7th). Instead, it was one of three Iowa districts that, by 1920, deviated less than a ten percent from the ideal "one person, one vote" population.

== Phase four: 1933 to 1943 ==
The 1930 census reflected that Iowa, like other rural Great Plains states, had not grown as much as states such as California, causing Iowa to lose seats in Congress for the first time. It lost two seats, forcing the Republican-dominated 1931 General Assembly to adopt a nine-district plan. As in 1872, the Ninth District included Sioux City and the northwestern corner of Iowa, but this time it included only thirteen counties (Dickinson, Clay, Buena Vista, Sac, Ida, Cherokee, O'Brien, Osceola, Lyon, Sioux, Plymouth, Woodbury, and Monona).

The first election under the nine-district plan, in 1932, coincided with the Franklin D. Roosevelt landslide, causing a northwestern Iowa Democrat (Guy M. Gillette of Cherokee County) to win a congressional race for only the second time ever. When Gillette ran for the U.S. Senate he was succeeded by another Democrat, Vincent Harrington of Sioux City. When Harrington could not complete the term he won in 1940 after he resigned to join the U.S. Army Air Corps in 1942, Republican Dickinson County Judge Harry E. Narey served the final six weeks of his term.

The district was eliminated after the 1940 census. All of the district was renamed the 8th district with the exception of Monona County, which was placed in the 7th district.

== List of members representing the district ==
Member	Party	Years	Cong ress	Electoral history
District created March 4, 1873
Jackson Orr (Boone)	Republican	March 4, 1873 – March 3, 1875	43rd	Redistricted from the 6th district and re-elected in 1872. Retired.
S. Addison Oliver (Onawa)	Republican	March 4, 1875 – March 3, 1879	44th 45th	Elected in 1874. Re-elected in 1876. Retired.
Cyrus C. Carpenter (Fort Dodge)	Republican	March 4, 1879 – March 3, 1883	46th 47th	Elected in 1878. Re-elected in 1880. Retired.
William H. M. Pusey (Council Bluffs)	Democratic	March 4, 1883 – March 3, 1885	48th	Elected in 1882. Lost re-election.
Joseph Lyman (Council Bluffs)	Republican	March 4, 1885 – March 3, 1889	49th 50th	Elected in 1884. Re-elected in 1886. Retired.
Joseph R. Reed (Council Bluffs)	Republican	March 4, 1889 – March 3, 1891	51st	Elected in 1888. Lost re-election.
Thomas Bowman (Council Bluffs)	Democratic	March 4, 1891 – March 3, 1893	52nd	Elected in 1890. Retired.
Alva L. Hager (Greenfield)	Republican	March 4, 1893 – March 3, 1899	53rd 54th 55th	Elected in 1892. Re-elected in 1894. Re-elected in 1896. Lost renomination.
Smith McPherson (Red Oak)	Republican	March 4, 1899 – June 6, 1900	56th	Elected in 1898. Resigned when appointed judge for the U.S. District Court for the Southern District of Iowa.
Vacant		June 6, 1900 – December 3, 1900	56th	
Walter I. Smith (Council Bluffs)	Republican	December 3, 1900 – March 15, 1911	56th 57th 58th 59th 60th 61st 62nd	Elected to finish McPherson's term. Re-elected in 1900. Re-elected in 1902. Re-elected in 1904. Re-elected in 1906. Re-elected in 1908. Re-elected in 1910. Resigned when appointed judge of the U.S. Court of Appeals for the Eighth Circuit
Vacant		March 15, 1911 – June 5, 1911	62nd	
William R. Green (Council Bluffs)	Republican	June 5, 1911 – March 31, 1928	62nd 63rd 64th 65th 66th 67th 68th 69th 70th	Elected to finish Smith's term. Re-elected in 1912. Re-elected in 1914. Re-elected in 1916. Re-elected in 1918. Re-elected in 1920. Re-elected in 1922. Re-elected in 1924. Re-elected in 1926. Resigned when appointed a judge of the U.S. Court of Claims.
Vacant		March 31, 1928 – June 4, 1928	70th	
Earl W. Vincent (Guthrie Center)	Republican	June 4, 1928 – March 3, 1929	70th	Elected to finish Green's term. Lost renomination.
Charles E. Swanson (Council Bluffs)	Republican	March 4, 1929 – March 3, 1933	71st 72nd	Elected in 1928. Re-elected in 1930. Redistricted to the 7th district and lost re-election.
Guy Gillette (Cherokee)	Democratic	March 4, 1933 – November 3, 1936	73rd 74th	Elected in 1932. Re-elected in 1934. Retired to run for U.S. senator and resigned when elected.
Vacant		November 3, 1936 – January 3, 1937	74th	
Vincent F. Harrington (Sioux City)	Democratic	January 3, 1937 – September 5, 1942	75th 76th 77th	Elected in 1936. Re-elected in 1938. Re-elected in 1940. Resigned to accept commission in the U.S. Army.
Vacant		September 5, 1942 – November 3, 1942	77th	
Harry E. Narey (Spirit Lake)	Republican	November 3, 1942 – January 3, 1943	77th	Elected to finish Harrington's term. Retired.
District eliminated January 3, 1943

== See also ==
- Iowa's congressional districts
