= 1925 United States House of Representatives elections =

- February 17, 1925 – December 26, 1925

6 (out of 435) seats in the United States House of Representatives
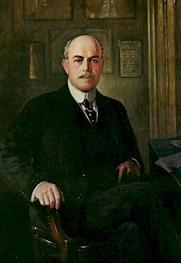

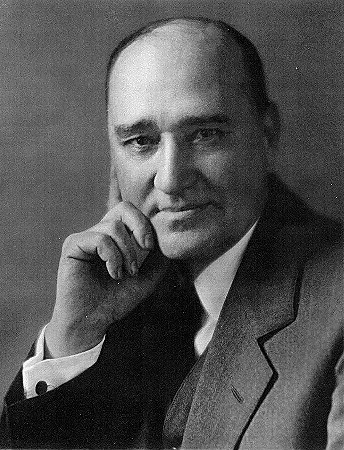
	Majority party	Minority party
Leader	Nicholas Longworth	Finis Garrett
Party	Republican	Democratic
Seat change	▲2	Steady
Seats up	3	1
Races won	5	1

There were six elections in 1925 to the United States House of Representatives

== List of elections ==
Elections are listed by date and district.

District	Incumbent			This race	
District	Member	Party	First elected	Results	Candidates
California 4	Vacant			Incumbent member-elect Julius Kahn (R) died December 18, 1924, during the 68th Congress, after his re-election to the 69th Congress. New member elected February 17, 1925 to begin her husband's term in the 69th Congress. Republican hold.	▌ ✓ Florence Prag Kahn (Republican) 48.37%; ▌Raymond A. Burr (Republican) 39.77%; ▌Harry William Hutton (Republican) 8.51%; ▌Henry C. Huck (Republican) 3.35%
Massachusetts 5	John J. Rogers	Republican	1912	Incumbent died March 28, 1925. New member elected June 30, 1925. Republican hold.	▌ ✓ Edith Nourse Rogers (Republican) 71.97%; ▌Eugene Foss (Democratic) 27.03%
Michigan 3	Arthur B. Williams	Republican	1923 (special)	Incumbent died May 1, 1925. New member elected August 18, 1925. Republican hold.	▌ ✓ Joseph L. Hooper (Republican) 62.00%; ▌Claude S. Carney (Democratic) 38.00%
Massachusetts 2	George B. Churchill	Republican	1924	Incumbent died July 1, 1925. New member elected September 29, 1925. Republican hold.	▌ ✓ Henry L. Bowles (Republican) 58.34%; ▌Roland D. Sawyer (Democratic) 41.65%
New Jersey 3	Vacant			Member-elect T. Frank Appleby (R) died December 15, 1924, during the 68th Congress, after his re-election to the 69th Congress. New member elected November 3, 1925 to finish his father's term. Republican hold.	▌ ✓ Stewart H. Appleby (Republican) 53.29%; ▌J. Kyle Kinmonth (Democratic) 46.71%
Kentucky 3	Robert Y. Thomas Jr.	Democratic	1908	Incumbent died September 3, 1925. New member elected December 26, 1925. Democratic hold.	▌ ✓ John W. Moore (Democratic) 52.93%; ▌Thurman B. Dixon (Republican) 47.07%

== See also ==
- 68th United States Congress
- 69th United States Congress
