= Earl W. Vincent =

American politician (1886–1953)

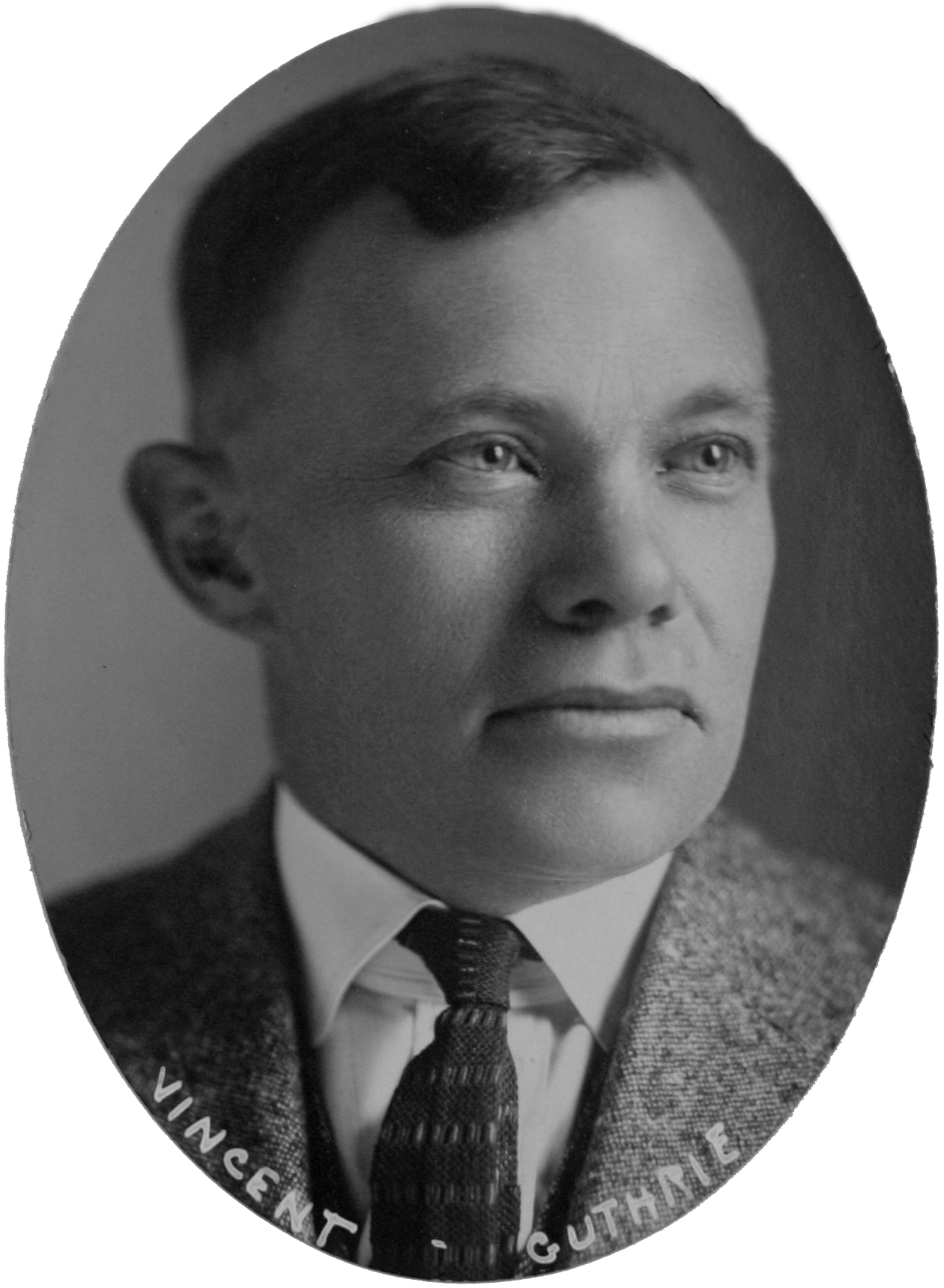
- From Vincent's 1923 Iowa House of Representatives biography

Member of the U.S. House of Representatives from Iowa's 9th district
- In office June 4, 1928 – March 3, 1929
- Preceded by: William R. Green
- Succeeded by: Charles Swanson

Personal details
- Born: March 27, 1886 Washington County, Iowa
- Died: May 22, 1953 (aged 67) Guthrie Center, Iowa
- Resting place: Union Cemetery
- Education: Monmouth College; University of Iowa College of Law
- Known for: Judicial District Judge of Iowa

Earl W. Vincent (March 27, 1886 – May 22, 1953) was a Republican U.S. Representative from Iowa's 9th congressional district in 1928–29, a delegate to the Republican State convention in 1930, and was appointed judge of the fifth judicial district of Iowa in February 1945.

Born in Washington County, Iowa, near Keota, Vincent attended rural schools. He graduated from Keota High School in 1904, from Monmouth College in Illinois in 1909, and from the University of Iowa College of Law in 1912. He was admitted to the bar in 1912 and commenced practice in Guthrie Center, Iowa. He served as prosecuting attorney of Guthrie County from 1919 to 1922.

In 1923, Vincent was elected to the Iowa House of Representatives, where he served two two-year terms, the last ending in 1927.

In early 1928, Republican Congressman William R. Green resigned his congressional seat in the ninth district when he was appointed as a federal judge. To fill what was left of Green's term, a special election was scheduled. After 194 ballots, a convention of ninth district Republicans selected Vincent as their nominee in April 1928. In the June 4, 1928 special election, Vincent defeated Democrat William J. Burke, and served in the remainder of the Seventieth Congress. Vincent also tried, and failed, to win his party's nomination for the next full term, but was defeated by Charles Swanson in a July 11, 1928 nominating convention. Vincent was ahead of the balloting until the close, when after 246 ballots, Swanson pulled ahead by the required number of votes. In all, Vincent served in Congress from June 1928, to March 3, 1929.

Returning to Iowa, Vincent resumed the practice of law in Guthrie Center, Iowa. He served as delegate to the Republican State convention in 1930. He was appointed judge of the fifth judicial district of Iowa in February 1945, and served until his death in Guthrie Center on May 22, 1953.

He was interred in Union Cemetery.

U.S. House of Representatives
Preceded by William R. Green	Member of the U.S. House of Representatives from Iowa's 9th congressional district 1928–1929	Succeeded by Charles E. Swanson
