= William R. Green =

American politician (1856–1947)

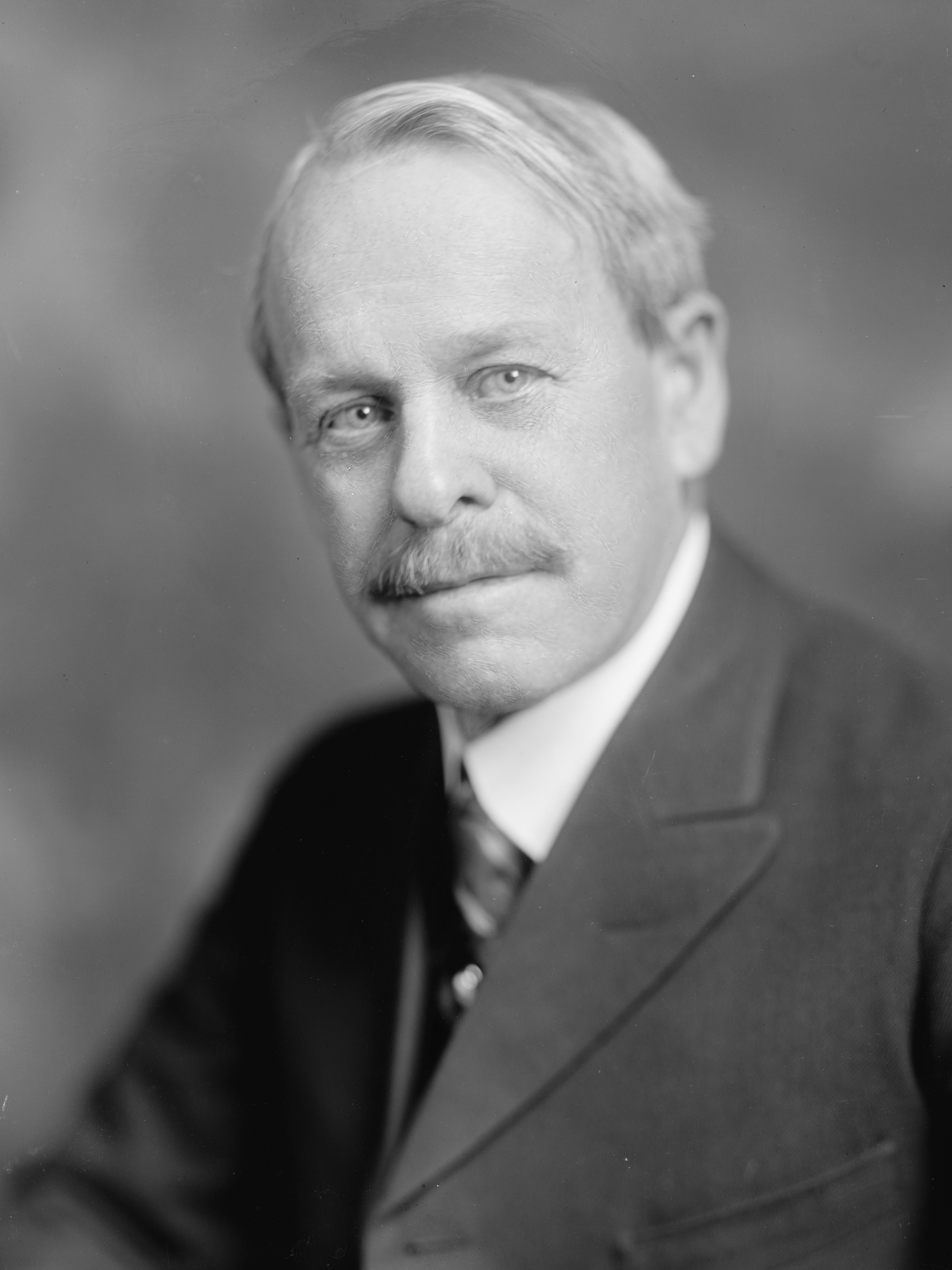

Senior Judge of the Court of Claims
- In office May 29, 1940 – June 11, 1947

Judge of the Court of Claims
- In office March 12, 1928 – May 29, 1940
- Appointed by: Calvin Coolidge
- Preceded by: James Hay
- Succeeded by: J. Warren Madden

Member of the U.S. House of Representatives from Iowa's 9th district
- In office June 5, 1911 – March 31, 1928
- Preceded by: Walter I. Smith
- Succeeded by: Earl W. Vincent

Personal details
- Born: William Raymond Green; November 7, 1856 Colchester, Connecticut, U.S.
- Died: June 11, 1947 (aged 90) Bellport, New York, U.S.
- Resting place: Rock Creek Cemetery; Washington, D.C., U.S.
- Party: Republican
- Education: Oberlin College (A.B.) read law

William Raymond Green (November 7, 1856 – June 11, 1947) was a United States representative from Iowa, Chairman of the House Ways and Means Committee and later was a judge of the Court of Claims. His son, William R. Green Jr., served on the United States Board of Tax Appeals.

== Education and career ==
Born on November 7, 1856, in Colchester, New London County, Connecticut, Green attended the public schools in Malden, Illinois and attended Princeton High School in Princeton, Illinois. He received an Artium Baccalaureus degree in 1879 from Oberlin College in Oberlin, Ohio and read law with McCoy & Pratt in Chicago, Illinois in 1882. He was admitted to the bar and entered private practice in Dow City, Iowa from 1882 to 1884. He continued private practice in Audubon, Iowa from 1884 to 1894. He served as a Judge of the Iowa District Court for the Fifteenth Judicial District from 1894 to 1911.

== Congressional service ==
Green was elected as a Republican to the United States House of Representatives of the 62nd United States Congress to fill the vacancy caused by the resignation of United States Representative Walter I. Smith. He was reelected to the 63rd United States Congress and to the seven succeeding Congresses and served from June 5, 1911, until March 31, 1928, when he resigned to accept a federal judgeship. He was Chairman of the House Ways and Means Committee in the 68th through 70th United States Congresses.

=== Political philosophy ===
Green was considered a moderate Republican who worked well as Ways and Means Committee Chairman with President Calvin Coolidge's Secretary of the Treasury, Andrew W. Mellon. Mellon's primary legislative objectives during Green's tenure involved tax reductions.

== Federal judicial service ==
Green was nominated by President Calvin Coolidge on February 20, 1928, to a seat on the Court of Claims (later the United States Court of Claims) vacated by Judge James Hay. He was confirmed by the United States Senate on March 12, 1928, and received his commission the same day. He assumed senior status on May 29, 1940. He assumed inactive senior status after June 1942, meaning that while he remained a federal judge, he no longer heard cases or participated in the business of the court. His service terminated on June 11, 1947, due to his death in Bellport, New York, where he had resided since taking inactive senior status. He was interred in Rock Creek Cemetery in Washington, D.C.

== Sources ==
- United States Congress. "William R. Green (id: G000422)". Biographical Directory of the United States Congress.
- "Green, William Raymond - Federal Judicial Center". www.fjc.gov.
- The United States Court of Claims : a history / pt. 1. The judges, 1855-1976 / by Marion T. Bennett / pt. 2. Origin, development, jurisdiction, 1855-1978 / W. Cowen, P. Nichols, M.T. Bennett. Washington, D.C.: Committee on the Bicentennial of Independence and the Constitution of the Judicial Conference of the United States. 1976.

U.S. House of Representatives
Preceded by Walter I. Smith	Member of the U.S. House of Representatives from Iowa's 9th congressional district 1911–1928	Succeeded by Earl W. Vincent
Legal offices
Preceded by James Hay	Judge of the Court of Claims; 1928–1940	Succeeded by J. Warren Madden
