= Charles E. Swanson =

American politician

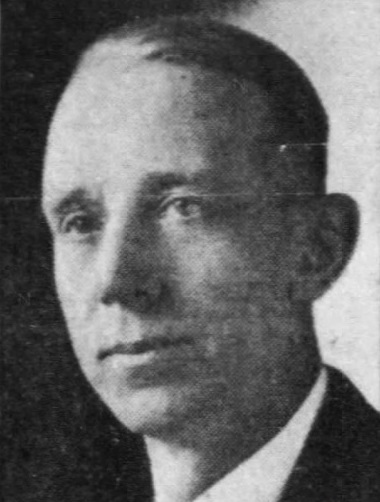

Member of the U.S. House of Representatives from Iowa's 9th district
- In office March 4, 1929 – March 3, 1933
- Preceded by: Earl W. Vincent
- Succeeded by: Guy Gillette

Personal details
- Born: Charles Edward Swanson; January 3, 1879 Galesburg, Illinois, U.S.
- Died: August 22, 1970 (aged 91) Council Bluffs, Iowa, U.S
- Party: Republican
- Education: Knox College; Northwestern University

Charles Edward Swanson (January 3, 1879 – August 22, 1970) served two terms as a Republican U.S. Representative from Iowa's 9th congressional district. His congressional career ended in the landslide that accompanied the election of Franklin D. Roosevelt to his first term as president.

Swanson was born in a farm near Galesburg, Illinois to Swedish immigrants, he attended the public schools in Galesburg. In 1890 he moved to Iowa with his parents, who settled on a farm in Ringgold County. He resumed his studies in the public school at Clearfield, Iowa. He returned to Galesburg to attend Knox College, where he graduated in 1902. He then served as principal of schools at Altona, Illinois from 1902 to 1904. He attended law school at Northwestern University and graduated in 1907, when he was admitted to the bar. He went into private practice in Council Bluffs, Iowa, where he served as prosecuting attorney of Pottawattamie County, Iowa from 1915 to 1922.

In 1928, Swanson was elected as a Republican to the U.S. House of Representatives. He was re-elected once, two years later. However, after reapportionment in 1931 placed him in Iowa's 7th congressional district, he prevailed in the Republican primary but lost in the general election to Democrat Otha Wearin. After resuming the practice of law, Swanson attempted to regain his seat in 1934, but was again defeated by Wearin. In all Swanson served in the Seventy-first and to the Seventy-second Congresses from March 4, 1929 to March 3, 1933.

Swanson later served as chairman of the Council Bluffs Board of Tax Review from 1949 to 1968. He died in Council Bluffs on August 22, 1970, and was interred in Walnut Hill Cemetery.

U.S. House of Representatives
Preceded by Earl W. Vincent	Member of the U.S. House of Representatives from Iowa's 9th congressional district 1929 – 1933 (obsolete district)	Succeeded by Guy M. Gillette
