= Political party strength in Iowa =

Politics in the US state of Iowa

The following table indicates the party of elected officials in the U.S. state of Iowa:

- Governor
- Lieutenant Governor
- Secretary of State
- Attorney General
- State Auditor
- State Treasurer
- Secretary of Agriculture

The table also indicates the historical party composition in the:

- State Senate
- State House of Representatives
- State delegation to the U.S. Senate
- State delegation to the U.S. House of Representatives

For years in which a presidential election was held, the table indicates which party's nominees received the state's electoral votes.

== 1846–1920 ==
| Year | Executive offices | | | | | | General Assembly | | United States Congress | | | Electoral votes |
| Year | Governor | Lt. Governor | Sec. of State | Attorney Gen. | Auditor | Treasurer | State Senate | State House | U.S. Senator (Class II) | U.S. Senator (Class III) | U.S. House | Electoral votes |
|---|---|---|---|---|---|---|---|---|---|---|---|---|
| 1846 | Ansel Briggs (D) | no such office | Elisha Cutler Jr. (D) | no such office | Joseph T. Fales (D) | Morgan Reno (D) | 12D, 6W | 23W, 17D | | | 2D | |
| 1847 | Ansel Briggs (D) | no such office | Elisha Cutler Jr. (D) | no such office | Joseph T. Fales (D) | Morgan Reno (D) | 12D, 6W | 23W, 17D | George Wallace Jones (D) | Augustus C. Dodge (D) | 2D | |
| 1848 | Ansel Briggs (D) | no such office | Josiah H. Bonney (D) | no such office | Joseph T. Fales (D) | Morgan Reno (D) | 12D, 6W | 23W, 17D | George Wallace Jones (D) | Augustus C. Dodge (D) | 2D | Lewis Cass/ William O. Butler (D) ✗ |
| 1849 | Ansel Briggs (D) | no such office | Josiah H. Bonney (D) | no such office | Joseph T. Fales (D) | Morgan Reno (D) | 11D, 8W | 28D, 11W | George Wallace Jones (D) | Augustus C. Dodge (D) | 1D, 1W | Lewis Cass/ William O. Butler (D) ✗ |
| 1850 | Ansel Briggs (D) | no such office | George W. McCleary (D) | no such office | William Pattee (D) | Israel Kister (D) | 11D, 8W | 28D, 11W | George Wallace Jones (D) | Augustus C. Dodge (D) | 1D, 1W | Lewis Cass/ William O. Butler (D) ✗ |
| 1851 | Stephen P. Hempstead (D) | no such office | George W. McCleary (D) | no such office | William Pattee (D) | Israel Kister (D) | 13D, 5W | 34D, 5W | George Wallace Jones (D) | Augustus C. Dodge (D) | 2D | Lewis Cass/ William O. Butler (D) ✗ |
| 1852 | Stephen P. Hempstead (D) | no such office | George W. McCleary (D) | no such office | William Pattee (D) | Martin L. Morris (D) | 13D, 5W | 34D, 5W | George Wallace Jones (D) | Augustus C. Dodge (D) | 2D | Franklin Pierce/ William R. King (D) ✓ |
| 1853 | Stephen P. Hempstead (D) | no such office | George W. McCleary (D) | David C. Cloud (D) | William Pattee (D) | Martin L. Morris (D) | 20D, 11W | 40D, 23W | George Wallace Jones (D) | Augustus C. Dodge (D) | 1D, 1W | Franklin Pierce/ William R. King (D) ✓ |
| 1854 | Stephen P. Hempstead (D) | no such office | George W. McCleary (D) | David C. Cloud (D) | Andrew J. Stevens (W) | Martin L. Morris (D) | 20D, 11W | 40D, 23W | George Wallace Jones (D) | Augustus C. Dodge (D) | 1D, 1W | Franklin Pierce/ William R. King (D) ✓ |
| 1855 | James W. Grimes (W) | no such office | George W. McCleary (D) | David C. Cloud (D) | John Pattee (R) | Martin L. Morris (D) | 17D, 14W | 40W, 31D | George Wallace Jones (D) | James Harlan (FS) | 1D, 1W | Franklin Pierce/ William R. King (D) ✓ |
| 1856 | James W. Grimes (W) | no such office | Elijah Sells (R) | Samuel Allen Rice (R) | John Pattee (R) | Martin L. Morris (D) | 17D, 14W | 40W, 31D | George Wallace Jones (D) | James Harlan (FS) | 1D, 1W | John C. Frémont/ William L. Dayton (R) ✗ |
| 1857 | James W. Grimes (W) | no such office | Elijah Sells (R) | Samuel Allen Rice (R) | John Pattee (R) | Martin L. Morris (D) | 23R, 12D | 44R, 26D | George Wallace Jones (D) | James Harlan (R) | 2R | John C. Frémont/ William L. Dayton (R) ✗ |
| 1858 | Ralph P. Lowe (R) | Oran Faville (R) | Elijah Sells (R) | Samuel Allen Rice (R) | John Pattee (R) | Martin L. Morris (D) | 22R, 14D (Note: The Iowa Constitution of 1857 moved the elections for state legislators from even years to odd years, making the 6th General Assembly only last one year in 1857 and the 7th last for two starting in 1858. Thus the terms of newly elected or current senators last only three years, and the terms of past or current representatives correspond to the duration of both.) | 42R, 30D | George Wallace Jones (D) | James Harlan (R) | 2R | John C. Frémont/ William L. Dayton (R) ✗ |
| 1859 | Ralph P. Lowe (R) | Oran Faville (R) | Elijah Sells (R) | Samuel Allen Rice (R) | Jonathan W. Battel (R) | John W. Jones (R) | 22R, 14D | 42R, 30D | James W. Grimes (R) | James Harlan (R) | 2R | John C. Frémont/ William L. Dayton (R) ✗ |
| 1860 | Samuel J. Kirkwood (R) | Nicholas J. Rusch (R) | Elijah Sells (R) | Samuel Allen Rice (R) | Jonathan W. Battel (R) | John W. Jones (R) | 23R, 20D | 49R, 37D | James W. Grimes (R) | James Harlan (R) | 2R | Abraham Lincoln/ Hannibal Hamlin (R) ✓ |
| 1861 | Samuel J. Kirkwood (R) | Nicholas J. Rusch (R) | Elijah Sells (R) | Charles C. Nourse (R) | Jonathan W. Battel (R) | John W. Jones (R) | 23R, 20D | 49R, 37D | James W. Grimes (R) | James Harlan (R) | 2R | Abraham Lincoln/ Hannibal Hamlin (R) ✓ |
| 1862 | Samuel J. Kirkwood (R) | John R. Needham (R) | Elijah Sells (R) | Charles C. Nourse (R) | Jonathan W. Battel (R) | John W. Jones (R) | 32R, 14D | 60R, 34D | James W. Grimes (R) | James Harlan (R) | 2R | Abraham Lincoln/ Hannibal Hamlin (R) ✓ |
| 1863 | Samuel J. Kirkwood (R) | John R. Needham (R) | James Wright (R) | Charles C. Nourse (R) | Jonathan W. Battel (R) | William H. Holmes (R) | 32R, 14D | 60R, 34D | James W. Grimes (R) | James Harlan (R) | 6R | Abraham Lincoln/ Hannibal Hamlin (R) ✓ |
| 1864 | William M. Stone (R) | Enoch W. Eastman (R) | James Wright (R) | Charles C. Nourse (R) | Jonathan W. Battel (R) | William H. Holmes (R) | 42R, 4D | 87R, 5D | James W. Grimes (R) | James Harlan (R) | 6R | Abraham Lincoln/ Andrew Johnson (NU) ✓ |
| 1865 | William M. Stone (R) | Enoch W. Eastman (R) | James Wright (R) | Isaac L. Allen (R) | John A. Elliott (R) | William H. Holmes (R) | 42R, 4D | 87R, 5D | James W. Grimes (R) | Samuel J. Kirkwood (R) | 6R | Abraham Lincoln/ Andrew Johnson (NU) ✓ |
| 1866 | William M. Stone (R) | Benjamin F. Gue (R) | James Wright (R) | Frederick E. Bissell (R) | John A. Elliott (R) | William H. Holmes (R) | 42R, 5D | 83R, 15D | James W. Grimes (R) | Samuel J. Kirkwood (R) | 6R | Abraham Lincoln/ Andrew Johnson (NU) ✓ |
| 1867 | William M. Stone (R) | Benjamin F. Gue (R) | Ed Wright (R) | Henry O'Connor (R) | John A. Elliott (R) | Samuel E. Rankin (R) | 42R, 5D | 83R, 15D | James W. Grimes (R) | James Harlan (R) | 6R | Abraham Lincoln/ Andrew Johnson (NU) ✓ |
| 1868 | Samuel Merrill (R) | John Scott (R) | Ed Wright (R) | Henry O'Connor (R) | John A. Elliott (R) | Samuel E. Rankin (R) | 42R, 7D | 86R, 14D | James W. Grimes (R) | James Harlan (R) | 6R | Ulysses S. Grant/ Schuyler Colfax (R) ✓ |
| 1869 | Samuel Merrill (R) | John Scott (R) | Ed Wright (R) | Henry O'Connor (R) | John A. Elliott (R) | Samuel E. Rankin (R) | 42R, 7D | 86R, 14D | James W. Grimes (R) | James Harlan (R) | 6R | Ulysses S. Grant/ Schuyler Colfax (R) ✓ |
| 1870 | Samuel Merrill (R) | Madison Miner Walden (R) | Ed Wright (R) | Henry O'Connor (R) | John A. Elliott (R) | Samuel E. Rankin (R) | 43R, 7D | 86R, 14D | James B. Howell (R) | James Harlan (R) | 6R | Ulysses S. Grant/ Schuyler Colfax (R) ✓ |
| 1871 | Samuel Merrill (R) | Henry C. Bulis (R) | Ed Wright (R) | Henry O'Connor (R) | John Russell (R) | Samuel E. Rankin (R) | 43R, 7D | 86R, 14D | George G. Wright (R) | James Harlan (R) | 6R | Ulysses S. Grant/ Schuyler Colfax (R) ✓ |
| 1872 | Cyrus C. Carpenter (R) | Henry C. Bulis (R) | Ed Wright (R) | Marsena E. Cutts (R) | John Russell (R) | Samuel E. Rankin (R) | 42R, 8D | 78R, 22D | George G. Wright (R) | James Harlan (R) | 6R | Ulysses S. Grant/ Henry Wilson (R) ✓ |
| 1873 | Cyrus C. Carpenter (R) | Henry C. Bulis (R) | Josiah T. Young (R) | Marsena E. Cutts (R) | John Russell (R) | William Christy (R) | 42R, 8D | 78R, 22D | George G. Wright (R) | William B. Allison (R) | 9R | Ulysses S. Grant/ Henry Wilson (R) ✓ |
| 1874 | Cyrus C. Carpenter (R) | Joseph Dysart (R) | Josiah T. Young (R) | Marsena E. Cutts (R) | John Russell (R) | William Christy (R) | 34R, 10I, 6D | 50R, 44I, 6D (Note: After 137 ballots, the Republicans and the Independent Anti-Monopolists with the Democrats, struck a deal on the evening of the 22nd of January, 1874. The Republicans controlled the Speakership under John H. Gear, but the Anti-Monopolists and Democrats controlled most of the minor offices, all standing committees' membership were split 50-50 including dual chairmen, and the investigation committees were run and led by the Anti-Monopolist coalition.) | George G. Wright (R) | William B. Allison (R) | 9R | Ulysses S. Grant/ Henry Wilson (R) ✓ |
| 1875 | Cyrus C. Carpenter (R) | Joseph Dysart (R) | Josiah T. Young (R) | Marsena E. Cutts (R) | Buren R. Sherman (R) | William Christy (R) | 34R, 10I, 6D | 50R, 44I, 6D | George G. Wright (R) | William B. Allison (R) | 8R, 1D | Ulysses S. Grant/ Henry Wilson (R) ✓ |
| 1876 | Samuel J. Kirkwood (R) (Note: Resigned to take an elected seat in the United States Senate.) | Joshua G. Newbold (R) | Josiah T. Young (R) | Marsena E. Cutts (R) | Buren R. Sherman (R) | William Christy (R) | 41R, 9D | 70R, 30D | George G. Wright (R) | William B. Allison (R) | 8R, 1D | Rutherford B. Hayes/ William A. Wheeler (R) ✓ |
| 1877 | Samuel J. Kirkwood (R) | Joshua G. Newbold (R) | Josiah T. Young (R) | John F. McJunkin (R) | Buren R. Sherman (R) | George W. Bemis (R) | 41R, 9D | 70R, 30D | Samuel J. Kirkwood (R) | William B. Allison (R) | 9R | Rutherford B. Hayes/ William A. Wheeler (R) ✓ |
| 1877 | Joshua G. Newbold (R) (Note: As lieutenant governor, filled unexpired term.) | vacant | Josiah T. Young (R) | John F. McJunkin (R) | Buren R. Sherman (R) | George W. Bemis (R) | 41R, 9D | 70R, 30D | Samuel J. Kirkwood (R) | William B. Allison (R) | 9R | Rutherford B. Hayes/ William A. Wheeler (R) ✓ |
| 1878 | John H. Gear (R) | Frank T. Campbell (R) | Josiah T. Young (R) | John F. McJunkin (R) | Buren R. Sherman (R) | George W. Bemis (R) | 38R, 12D | 73R, 25D, 2GB | Samuel J. Kirkwood (R) | William B. Allison (R) | 9R | Rutherford B. Hayes/ William A. Wheeler (R) ✓ |
| 1879 | John H. Gear (R) | Frank T. Campbell (R) | John A. T. Hull (R) | John F. McJunkin (R) | Buren R. Sherman (R) | George W. Bemis (R) | 38R, 12D | 73R, 25D, 2GB | Samuel J. Kirkwood (R) | William B. Allison (R) | 7R, 2GB | Rutherford B. Hayes/ William A. Wheeler (R) ✓ |
| 1880 | John H. Gear (R) | Frank T. Campbell (R) | John A. T. Hull (R) | John F. McJunkin (R) | Buren R. Sherman (R) | George W. Bemis (R) | 41R, 7D, 2GB | 82R, 14D, 4GB | Samuel J. Kirkwood (R) | William B. Allison (R) | 7R, 2GB | James A. Garfield/ Chester A. Arthur (R) ✓ |
| 1881 | John H. Gear (R) | Frank T. Campbell (R) | John A. T. Hull (R) | Smith McPherson (R) | William V. Lucas (R) | Edwin H. Conger (R) | 41R, 7D, 2GB | 82R, 14D, 4GB | James W. McDill (R) | William B. Allison (R) | 9R | James A. Garfield/ Chester A. Arthur (R) ✓ |
| 1882 | Buren R. Sherman (R) | Orlando H. Manning (R) | John A. T. Hull (R) | Smith McPherson (R) | William V. Lucas (R) | Edwin H. Conger (R) | 46R, 2D, 2GB | 71R, 22D, 7GB | James W. McDill (R) | William B. Allison (R) | 9R | James A. Garfield/ Chester A. Arthur (R) ✓ |
| 1883 | Buren R. Sherman (R) | Orlando H. Manning (R) | John A. T. Hull (R) | Smith McPherson (R) | John L. Brown (R) | Edwin H. Conger (R) | 46R, 2D, 2GB | 71R, 22D, 7GB | James F. Wilson (R) | William B. Allison (R) | 8R, 2D, 1GB | James A. Garfield/ Chester A. Arthur (R) ✓ |
| 1884 | Buren R. Sherman (R) | Orlando H. Manning (R) | John A. T. Hull (R) | Smith McPherson (R) | John L. Brown (R) | Edwin H. Conger (R) | 39R, 11D | 52R, 42D, 6GB | James F. Wilson (R) | William B. Allison (R) | 6R, 4D, 1GB | James G. Blaine/ John A. Logan (R) ✗ |
| 1885 | Buren R. Sherman (R) | Orlando H. Manning (R) | Frank D. Jackson (R) | Andrew J. Baker (R) | Jonathan W. Battell (R) | Voltaire P. Twombly (R) | 39R, 11D | 52R, 42D, 6GB | James F. Wilson (R) | William B. Allison (R) | 7R, 2D, 1G | James G. Blaine/ John A. Logan (R) ✗ |
| 1886 | William Larrabee (R) | John A. T. Hull (R) | Frank D. Jackson (R) | Andrew J. Baker (R) | Charles Beardsley (R) | Voltaire P. Twombly (R) | 31R, 19D | 60R, 39D, 1I | James F. Wilson (R) | William B. Allison (R) | 7R, 2D, 1G | James G. Blaine/ John A. Logan (R) ✗ |
| 1887 | William Larrabee (R) | John A. T. Hull (R) | Frank D. Jackson (R) | Andrew J. Baker (R) | John L. Brown (R) | Voltaire P. Twombly (R) | 31R, 19D | 60R, 39D, 1I | James F. Wilson (R) | William B. Allison (R) | 8R, 1D, 1GB, 1IR | James G. Blaine/ John A. Logan (R) ✗ |
| 1888 | William Larrabee (R) | John A. T. Hull (R) | Frank D. Jackson (R) | Andrew J. Baker (R) | Hames A. Lyons (R) | Voltaire P. Twombly (R) | 35R, 15D | 64R, 33D, 3I | James F. Wilson (R) | William B. Allison (R) | 8R, 1D, 1GB, 1IR | Benjamin Harrison/ Levi P. Morton (R) ✓ |
| 1889 | William Larrabee (R) | John A. T. Hull (R) | Frank D. Jackson (R) | John Young Stone (R) | Hames A. Lyons (R) | Voltaire P. Twombly (R) | 35R, 15D | 64R, 33D, 3I | James F. Wilson (R) | William B. Allison (R) | 10R, 1D | Benjamin Harrison/ Levi P. Morton (R) ✓ |
| 1890 | Horace Boies (D) | Alfred N. Poyneer (R) | Frank D. Jackson (R) | John Young Stone (R) | Hames A. Lyons (R) | Voltaire P. Twombly (R) | 28R, 20D, 1UL, 1I | 50D, 45R, 4I, 1UL (Note: After 137 ballots, the Republicans and Democrats came to an agreement where the Democrats got the Speakership under John T. Hamilton, while the Republicans got the seat of Speaker pro Tempore, and the committees and minor offices were split.) | James F. Wilson (R) | William B. Allison (R) | 10R, 1D | Benjamin Harrison/ Levi P. Morton (R) ✓ |
| 1891 | Horace Boies (D) | Alfred N. Poyneer (R) | William M. McFarland (R) | John Young Stone (R) | Hames A. Lyons (R) | Byron A. Beeson (R) | 28R, 20D, 1UL, 1I | 50D, 45R, 4I, 1UL | James F. Wilson (R) | William B. Allison (R) | 6D, 5R | Benjamin Harrison/ Levi P. Morton (R) ✓ |
| 1892 | Horace Boies (D) | Samuel L. Bestow (D) | William M. McFarland (R) | John Young Stone (R) | Hames A. Lyons (R) | Byron A. Beeson (R) | 25D, 24R, 1Pop (Note: With a Democratic Lt. Governor in Samuel L. Bestow who was also President of the Senate, the Democrats had the tie breaking vote, chose M.J. Kelly as President Pro Tempore, and organized the chamber.) | 54R, 45D, 1I | James F. Wilson (R) | William B. Allison (R) | 6D, 5R | Benjamin Harrison/ Whitelaw Reid (R) ✗ |
| 1893 | Horace Boies (D) | Samuel L. Bestow (D) | William M. McFarland (R) | John Young Stone (R) | Cornelius G. McCarthy (R) | Byron A. Beeson (R) | 25D, 24R, 1Pop | 54R, 45D, 1I | James F. Wilson (R) | William B. Allison (R) | 10R, 1D | Benjamin Harrison/ Whitelaw Reid (R) ✗ |
| 1894 | Frank D. Jackson (R) | Warren S. Dungan (R) | William M. McFarland (R) | John Young Stone (R) | Cornelius G. McCarthy (R) | Byron A. Beeson (R) | 34R, 16D | 79R, 21D | James F. Wilson (R) | William B. Allison (R) | 10R, 1D | Benjamin Harrison/ Whitelaw Reid (R) ✗ |
| 1895 | Frank D. Jackson (R) | Warren S. Dungan (R) | William M. McFarland (R) | Milton Remley (R) | Cornelius G. McCarthy (R) | John Herriott (R) | 34R, 16D | 79R, 21D | John H. Gear (R) | William B. Allison (R) | 11R | Benjamin Harrison/ Whitelaw Reid (R) ✗ |
| 1896 | Francis M. Drake (R) | Matt Parrott (R) | William M. McFarland (R) | Milton Remley (R) | Cornelius G. McCarthy (R) | John Herriott (R) | 43R, 7D | 80R, 20D | John H. Gear (R) | William B. Allison (R) | 11R | William McKinley/ Garret Hobart (R) ✓ |
| 1897 | Francis M. Drake (R) | Matt Parrott (R) | George L. Dobson (R) | Milton Remley (R) | Cornelius G. McCarthy (R) | John Herriott (R) | 43R, 7D | 80R, 20D | John H. Gear (R) | William B. Allison (R) | 11R | William McKinley/ Garret Hobart (R) ✓ |
| 1898 | L. M. Shaw (R) | James C. Milliman (R) | George L. Dobson (R) | Milton Remley (R) | Cornelius G. McCarthy (R) | John Herriott (R) | 39R, 11D | 62R, 38D | John H. Gear (R) | William B. Allison (R) | 11R | William McKinley/ Garret Hobart (R) ✓ |
| 1899 | L. M. Shaw (R) | James C. Milliman (R) | George L. Dobson (R) | Milton Remley (R) | Frank Merriam (R) | John Herriott (R) | 39R, 11D | 62R, 38D | John H. Gear (R) | William B. Allison (R) | 11R | William McKinley/ Garret Hobart (R) ✓ |
| 1900 | L. M. Shaw (R) | James C. Milliman (R) | George L. Dobson (R) | Milton Remley (R) | Frank Merriam (R) | John Herriott (R) | 42R, 8D | 81R, 19D | John H. Gear (R) | William B. Allison (R) | 11R | William McKinley/ Theodore Roosevelt (R) ✓ |
| 1901 | L. M. Shaw (R) | James C. Milliman (R) | William B. Martin (R) | Charles W. Mullan (R) | Frank Merriam (R) | Gilbert S. Gilbertson (R) | 42R, 8D | 81R, 19D | Jonathan P. Dolliver (R) | William B. Allison (R) | 11R | William McKinley/ Theodore Roosevelt (R) ✓ |
| 1902 | Albert B. Cummins (R) | John Herriott (R) | William B. Martin (R) | Charles W. Mullan (R) | Frank Merriam (R) | Gilbert S. Gilbertson (R) | 39R, 11D | 84R, 16D | Jonathan P. Dolliver (R) | William B. Allison (R) | 11R | William McKinley/ Theodore Roosevelt (R) ✓ |
| 1903 | Albert B. Cummins (R) | John Herriott (R) | William B. Martin (R) | Charles W. Mullan (R) | Beryl F. Carroll (R) | Gilbert S. Gilbertson (R) | 39R, 11D | 84R, 16D | Jonathan P. Dolliver (R) | William B. Allison (R) | 10R, 1D | William McKinley/ Theodore Roosevelt (R) ✓ |
| 1904 | Albert B. Cummins (R) | John Herriott (R) | William B. Martin (R) | Charles W. Mullan (R) | Beryl F. Carroll (R) | Gilbert S. Gilbertson (R) | 42R, 8D | 78R, 22D | Jonathan P. Dolliver (R) | William B. Allison (R) | 10R, 1D | Theodore Roosevelt/ Charles W. Fairbanks (R) ✓ |
| 1905 | Albert B. Cummins (R) | John Herriott (R) | William B. Martin (R) | Charles W. Mullan (R) | Beryl F. Carroll (R) | Gilbert S. Gilbertson (R) | 42R, 8D | 78R, 22D | Jonathan P. Dolliver (R) | William B. Allison (R) | 11R | Theodore Roosevelt/ Charles W. Fairbanks (R) ✓ |
| 1906 | Albert B. Cummins (R) | John Herriott (R) | William B. Martin (R) | Charles W. Mullan (R) | Beryl F. Carroll (R) | Gilbert S. Gilbertson (R) | 40R, 10D (Note: A constitutional amendment in 1905 moved the elections for state legislators from odd years to even years, making the 31st General Assembly only last one year. Thus, the terms of newly elected or current senators lasted only three years, and the terms of newly elected representatives lasted only one year (except for those elected in 1906, whose terms lasted two years.) | 82R, 18D | Jonathan P. Dolliver (R) | William B. Allison (R) | 11R | Theodore Roosevelt/ Charles W. Fairbanks (R) ✓ |
| 1907 | Albert B. Cummins (R) | Warren Garst (R) | William C. Hayward (R) | John F. Riggs | Beryl F. Carroll (R) | Willison W. Morrow (R) | 36R, 14D | 75R, 33D | Jonathan P. Dolliver (R) | William B. Allison (R) | 10R, 1D | Theodore Roosevelt/ Charles W. Fairbanks (R) ✓ |
| 1908 | Albert B. Cummins (R) | Warren Garst (R) | William C. Hayward (R) | John F. Riggs | Beryl F. Carroll (R) | Willison W. Morrow (R) | 36R, 14D | 75R, 33D | Jonathan P. Dolliver (R) | William B. Allison (R) | 10R, 1D | William Howard Taft/ James S. Sherman (R) ✓ |
| 1908 | Warren Garst (R) | vacant | William C. Hayward (R) | John F. Riggs | Beryl F. Carroll (R) | Willison W. Morrow (R) | 36R, 14D | 75R, 33D | Jonathan P. Dolliver (R) | William B. Allison (R) | 10R, 1D | William Howard Taft/ James S. Sherman (R) ✓ |
| 1909 | Beryl F. Carroll (R) | George W. Clarke (R) | William C. Hayward (R) | Howard Webster Byers (R) | John L. Bleakly (R) | Willison W. Morrow (R) | 34R, 16D | 80R, 28D | Jonathan P. Dolliver (R) | Albert B. Cummins (R) | 10R, 1D | William Howard Taft/ James S. Sherman (R) ✓ |
| 1910 | Beryl F. Carroll (R) | George W. Clarke (R) | William C. Hayward (R) | Howard Webster Byers (R) | John L. Bleakly (R) | Willison W. Morrow (R) | 34R, 16D | 80R, 28D | Lafayette Young (R) | Albert B. Cummins (R) | 10R, 1D | William Howard Taft/ James S. Sherman (R) ✓ |
| 1911 | Beryl F. Carroll (R) | George W. Clarke (R) | William C. Hayward (R) | George Cosson (R) | John L. Bleakly (R) | Willison W. Morrow (R) | 34R, 16D | 70R, 38D | Lafayette Young (R) | Albert B. Cummins (R) | 10R, 1D | William Howard Taft/ James S. Sherman (R) ✓ |
| 1912 | Beryl F. Carroll (R) | George W. Clarke (R) | William C. Hayward (R) | George Cosson (R) | John L. Bleakly (R) | Willison W. Morrow (R) | 34R, 16D | 70R, 38D | William S. Kenyon (R) | Albert B. Cummins (R) | 10R, 1D | Woodrow Wilson/ Thomas R. Marshall (D) ✓ |
| 1913 | George W. Clarke (R) | William L. Harding (R) | William S. Allen (R) | George Cosson (R) | John L. Bleakly (R) | William C. Brown (R) | 33R, 17D | 66R, 42D | William S. Kenyon (R) | Albert B. Cummins (R) | 8R, 3D | Woodrow Wilson/ Thomas R. Marshall (D) ✓ |
| 1914 | George W. Clarke (R) | William L. Harding (R) | William S. Allen (R) | George Cosson (R) | John L. Bleakly (R) | William C. Brown (R) | 33R, 17D | 66R, 42D | William S. Kenyon (R) | Albert B. Cummins (R) | 8R, 3D | Woodrow Wilson/ Thomas R. Marshall (D) ✓ |
| 1915 | George W. Clarke (R) | William L. Harding (R) | William S. Allen (R) | George Cosson (R) | Frank S. Shaw (R) | William C. Brown (R) | 35R, 15D | 76R, 32D | William S. Kenyon (R) | Albert B. Cummins (R) | 10R, 1D | Woodrow Wilson/ Thomas R. Marshall (D) ✓ |
| 1916 | George W. Clarke (R) | William L. Harding (R) | William S. Allen (R) | George Cosson (R) | Frank S. Shaw (R) | William C. Brown (R) | 35R, 15D | 76R, 32D | William S. Kenyon (R) | Albert B. Cummins (R) | 10R, 1D | Charles Evans Hughes/ Charles W. Fairbanks (R) ✗ |
| 1917 | William L. Harding (R) | Ernest Robert Moore (R) | William S. Allen (R) | H. M. Havner (R) | Frank S. Shaw (R) | Edwin H. Hoyt (R) | 40R, 10D | 94R, 14D | William S. Kenyon (R) | Albert B. Cummins (R) | 11R | Charles Evans Hughes/ Charles W. Fairbanks (R) ✗ |
| 1918 | William L. Harding (R) | Ernest Robert Moore (R) | William S. Allen (R) | H. M. Havner (R) | Frank S. Shaw (R) | Edwin H. Hoyt (R) | 40R, 10D | 94R, 14D | William S. Kenyon (R) | Albert B. Cummins (R) | 11R | Charles Evans Hughes/ Charles W. Fairbanks (R) ✗ |
| 1919 | William L. Harding (R) | Ernest Robert Moore (R) | Walter C. Ramsay (R) | H. M. Havner (R) | Frank S. Shaw (R) | Edwin H. Hoyt (R) | 45R, 5D | 93R, 15D | William S. Kenyon (R) | Albert B. Cummins (R) | 11R | Charles Evans Hughes/ Charles W. Fairbanks (R) ✗ |
| 1920 | William L. Harding (R) | Ernest Robert Moore (R) | Walter C. Ramsay (R) | H. M. Havner (R) | Frank S. Shaw (R) | Edwin H. Hoyt (R) | 45R, 5D | 93R, 15D | William S. Kenyon (R) | Albert B. Cummins (R) | 11R | Warren G. Harding/ Calvin Coolidge (R) ✓ |

== 1921–present ==
| Year | Executive offices | | | | | | | General Assembly | | United States Congress | | | Electoral votes |
| Year | Governor | Lt. Governor | Sec. of State | Attorney Gen. | Auditor | Treasurer | Sec. of Ag. | State Senate | State House | U.S. Senator (Class II) | U.S. Senator (Class III) | U.S. House | Electoral votes |
|---|---|---|---|---|---|---|---|---|---|---|---|---|---|
| 1921 | Nathan E. Kendall (R) | John Hammill (R) | Walter C. Ramsay (R) | Ben Gibson (R) | Glenn C. Haynes (R) | William J. Burbank (R) | no such office | 48R, 2D | 101R, 6D, 1I | William S. Kenyon (R) | Albert B. Cummins (R) | 11R | |
| 1922 | Nathan E. Kendall (R) | John Hammill (R) | Walter C. Ramsay (R) | Ben Gibson (R) | Glenn C. Haynes (R) | William J. Burbank (R) | no such office | 48R, 2D | 101R, 6D, 1I | Smith W. Brookhart (R) | Albert B. Cummins (R) | 11R | |
| 1923 | Nathan E. Kendall (R) | John Hammill (R) | Walter C. Ramsay (R) | Ben Gibson (R) | Glenn C. Haynes (R) | William J. Burbank (R) | Raymond W. Cassidy (R) | 46R, 4D | 91R, 16D, 1I | Smith W. Brookhart (R) | Albert B. Cummins (R) | 11R | |
| 1924 | Nathan E. Kendall (R) | John Hammill (R) | Walter C. Ramsay (R) | Ben Gibson (R) | James E. Thomas (R) | William J. Burbank (R) | R. G. Clark (R) | 46R, 4D | 91R, 16D, 1I | Smith W. Brookhart (R) | Albert B. Cummins (R) | 11R | Calvin Coolidge/ Charles G. Dawes (R) ✓ |
| 1925 | John Hammill (R) | Clem F. Kimball (R) | Walter C. Ramsay (R) | Ben Gibson (R) | J. C. McClune (R) | Raymond E. Johnson (R) | Mark G. Thornburg (R) | 45R, 4D, 1I | 101R, 7D | Smith W. Brookhart (R) | Albert B. Cummins (R) | 11R | Calvin Coolidge/ Charles G. Dawes (R) ✓ |
| 1926 | John Hammill (R) | Clem F. Kimball (R) | Walter C. Ramsay (R) | Ben Gibson (R) | J. C. McClune (R) | Raymond E. Johnson (R) | Mark G. Thornburg (R) | 45R, 4D, 1I | 101R, 7D | Daniel F. Steck (D) | Albert B. Cummins (R) | 11R | Calvin Coolidge/ Charles G. Dawes (R) ✓ |
| 1927 | John Hammill (R) | Clem F. Kimball (R) | Walter C. Ramsay (R) | John Fletcher (R) | J. W. Long (R) | Raymond E. Johnson (R) | Mark G. Thornburg (R) | 48R, 1D, 1ID | 95R, 13D | Daniel F. Steck (D) | Smith W. Brookhart (R) | 11R | Calvin Coolidge/ Charles G. Dawes (R) ✓ |
| 1928 | John Hammill (R) | Arch W. McFarlane (R) | Edward McMurray Smith (R) | John Fletcher (R) | J. W. Long (R) | Raymond E. Johnson (R) | Mark G. Thornburg (R) | 48R, 1D, 1ID | 95R, 13D | Daniel F. Steck (D) | Smith W. Brookhart (R) | 11R | Herbert Hoover/ Charles Curtis (R) ✓ |
| 1929 | John Hammill (R) | Arch W. McFarlane (R) | Edward McMurray Smith (R) | John Fletcher (R) | J. W. Long (R) | Raymond E. Johnson (R) | Mark G. Thornburg (R) | 48R, 2D | 96R, 12D | Daniel F. Steck (D) | Smith W. Brookhart (R) | 11R | Herbert Hoover/ Charles Curtis (R) ✓ |
| 1930 | John Hammill (R) | Arch W. McFarlane (R) | Edward McMurray Smith (R) | John Fletcher (R) | J. W. Long (R) | Raymond E. Johnson (R) | Mark G. Thornburg (R) | 48R, 2D | 96R, 12D | Daniel F. Steck (D) | Smith W. Brookhart (R) | 11R | Herbert Hoover/ Charles Curtis (R) ✓ |
| 1931 | Dan W. Turner (R) | Arch W. McFarlane (R) | G. C. Greenwalt (R) | John Fletcher (R) | J. W. Long (R) | Raymond E. Johnson (R) | Mark G. Thornburg (R) | 44R, 6D | 71R, 37D | L. J. Dickinson (R) | Smith W. Brookhart (R) | 10R, 1D | Herbert Hoover/ Charles Curtis (R) ✓ |
| 1932 | Dan W. Turner (R) | Arch W. McFarlane (R) | G. C. Greenwalt (R) | John Fletcher (R) | C. Fred Porter (R) | Raymond E. Johnson (R) | Mark G. Thornburg (R) | 44R, 6D | 71R, 37D | L. J. Dickinson (R) | Smith W. Brookhart (R) | 10R, 1D | Franklin D. Roosevelt/ John Nance Garner (D) ✓ |
| 1933 | Clyde L. Herring (D) | Nelson G. Kraschel (D) | Ola Babcock Miller (D) | Edward L. O'Connor (D) | Charles W. Storms (D) | Leo J. Wegman (D) | Ray Murray (D) | 25D, 25R (Note: The Republicans acquiesced to a Democratic President Pro Tempore, Irving H. Knudson, by unanimous consent. The Senate itself was organized on mostly bipartisan lines.) | 76D, 32R | L. J. Dickinson (R) | Louis Murphy (D) | 6D, 3R | Franklin D. Roosevelt/ John Nance Garner (D) ✓ |
| 1934 | Clyde L. Herring (D) | Nelson G. Kraschel (D) | Ola Babcock Miller (D) | Edward L. O'Connor (D) | Charles W. Storms (D) | Leo J. Wegman (D) | Ray Murray (D) | 26R, 24D (Note: In district 45, Democratic Senator Harry Cook White was succeeded by Republican Richard V. Leo following a special election in 1933) | 76D, 32R | L. J. Dickinson (R) | Louis Murphy (D) | 6D, 3R | Franklin D. Roosevelt/ John Nance Garner (D) ✓ |
| 1935 | Clyde L. Herring (D) | Nelson G. Kraschel (D) | Ola Babcock Miller (D) | Edward L. O'Connor (D) | Charles W. Storms (D) | Leo J. Wegman (D) | Ray Murray (D) | 28D, 22R | 58D, 50R | L. J. Dickinson (R) | Louis Murphy (D) | 6D, 3R | Franklin D. Roosevelt/ John Nance Garner (D) ✓ |
| 1936 | Clyde L. Herring (D) | Nelson G. Kraschel (D) | Ola Babcock Miller (D) | Edward L. O'Connor (D) | Charles W. Storms (D) | Leo J. Wegman (D) | Ray Murray (D) | 26D, 24R (Note: Numerous special elections resulted in a net gain of two seats for the Republicans by the time of the 1936 election.) | 58D, 50R | L. J. Dickinson (R) | Louis Murphy (D) | 6D, 3R | Franklin D. Roosevelt/ John Nance Garner (D) ✓ |
| 1937 | Nelson G. Kraschel (D) | John K. Valentine (D) | Robert E. O'Brien (D) | John H. Mitchell (D) | Charles W. Storms (D) | Leo J. Wegman (D) | Thomas L. Curran (D) | 28R, 22D | 54D, 54R (Note: A Republican voted with the Democrats to elect a Democratic Speaker, LaMar Foster. Democrats were thus able to organize and control the House.) | Clyde L. Herring (D) | Guy Gillette (D) | 5D, 4R | Franklin D. Roosevelt/ John Nance Garner (D) ✓ |
| 1938 | Nelson G. Kraschel (D) | John K. Valentine (D) | Robert E. O'Brien (D) | John H. Mitchell (D) | Charles W. Storms (D) | Leo J. Wegman (D) | Thomas L. Curran (D) | 29R, 21D (Note: Democratic Senator Timothy Francis "T. F." Driscoll died in early 1937. Republican Stanley Lawrence Hart was elected to succeed him.) | 54D, 54R | Clyde L. Herring (D) | Guy Gillette (D) | 5D, 4R | Franklin D. Roosevelt/ John Nance Garner (D) ✓ |
| 1939 | George A. Wilson (R) | Bourke B. Hickenlooper (R) | Earl G. Miller (R) | Fred D. Everett (R) | C. B. (Chet) Akers (R) | Willis Bagley (R) | Mark G. Thornburg (R) | 38R, 12D | 89R, 19D | Clyde L. Herring (D) | Guy Gillette (D) | 7R, 2D | Franklin D. Roosevelt/ John Nance Garner (D) ✓ |
| 1940 | George A. Wilson (R) | Bourke B. Hickenlooper (R) | Earl G. Miller (R) | Fred D. Everett (R) | C. B. (Chet) Akers (R) | Willis Bagley (R) | Mark G. Thornburg (R) | 38R, 12D | 89R, 19D | Clyde L. Herring (D) | Guy Gillette (D) | 7R, 2D | Wendell Willkie/ Charles L. McNary (R) ✗ |
| 1941 | George A. Wilson (R) | Bourke B. Hickenlooper (R) | Earl G. Miller (R) | John M. Rankin (R) | C. B. (Chet) Akers (R) | Willis Bagley (R) | Mark G. Thornburg (R) | 45R, 5D | 87R, 21D | Clyde L. Herring (D) | Guy Gillette (D) | 7R, 2D | Wendell Willkie/ Charles L. McNary (R) ✗ |
| 1942 | George A. Wilson (R) | Bourke B. Hickenlooper (R) | Earl G. Miller (R) | John M. Rankin (R) | C. B. (Chet) Akers (R) | Willis Bagley (R) | Mark G. Thornburg (R) | 45R, 5D | 87R, 21D | Clyde L. Herring (D) | Guy Gillette (D) | 8R, 1D | Wendell Willkie/ Charles L. McNary (R) ✗ |
| 1943 | Bourke B. Hickenlooper (R) | Robert D. Blue (R) | Wayne M. Ropes (R) | John M. Rankin (R) | C. B. (Chet) Akers (R) | John M. Grimes (R) | Harry D. Linn (R) | 45R, 5D | 98R, 10D | George A. Wilson (R) | Guy Gillette (D) | 8R | Wendell Willkie/ Charles L. McNary (R) ✗ |
| 1944 | Bourke B. Hickenlooper (R) | Robert D. Blue (R) | Wayne M. Ropes (R) | John M. Rankin (R) | C. B. (Chet) Akers (R) | John M. Grimes (R) | Harry D. Linn (R) | 45R, 5D | 98R, 10D | George A. Wilson (R) | Guy Gillette (D) | 8R | Thomas E. Dewey/ John W. Bricker (R) ✗ |
| 1945 | Robert D. Blue (R) | Kenneth A. Evans (R) | Wayne M. Ropes (R) | John M. Rankin (R) | C. B. (Chet) Akers (R) | John M. Grimes (R) | Harry D. Linn (R) | 45R, 5D | 91R, 17D | George A. Wilson (R) | Bourke B. Hickenlooper (R) | 8R | Thomas E. Dewey/ John W. Bricker (R) ✗ |
| 1946 | Robert D. Blue (R) | Kenneth A. Evans (R) | Wayne M. Ropes (R) | John M. Rankin (R) | C. B. (Chet) Akers (R) | John M. Grimes (R) | Harry D. Linn (R) | 45R, 5D | 91R, 17D | George A. Wilson (R) | Bourke B. Hickenlooper (R) | 8R | Thomas E. Dewey/ John W. Bricker (R) ✗ |
| 1947 | Robert D. Blue (R) | Kenneth A. Evans (R) | Rolo H. Bergeson (R) | Robert L. Larson (R) | C. B. (Chet) Akers (R) | John M. Grimes (R) | Harry D. Linn (R) | 44R, 6D | 98R, 10D | George A. Wilson (R) | Bourke B. Hickenlooper (R) | 8R | Thomas E. Dewey/ John W. Bricker (R) ✗ |
| 1948 | Robert D. Blue (R) | Kenneth A. Evans (R) | Rolo H. Bergeson (R) | Robert L. Larson (R) | C. B. (Chet) Akers (R) | John M. Grimes (R) | Harry D. Linn (R) | 44R, 6D | 98R, 10D | George A. Wilson (R) | Bourke B. Hickenlooper (R) | 8R | Harry S. Truman/ Alben W. Barkley (D) ✓ |
| 1949 | William S. Beardsley (R) (Note: Died in office.) | Kenneth A. Evans (R) | Melvin D. Synhorst (R) | Robert L. Larson (R) | C. B. (Chet) Akers (R) | John M. Grimes (R) | Harry D. Linn (R) | 43R, 7D | 79R, 29D | Guy Gillette (D) | Bourke B. Hickenlooper (R) | 8R | Harry S. Truman/ Alben W. Barkley (D) ✓ |
| 1950 | William S. Beardsley (R) | Kenneth A. Evans (R) | Melvin D. Synhorst (R) | Robert L. Larson (R) | C. B. (Chet) Akers (R) | John M. Grimes (R) | Clyde Spry (R) | 43R, 7D | 79R, 29D | Guy Gillette (D) | Bourke B. Hickenlooper (R) | 8R | Harry S. Truman/ Alben W. Barkley (D) ✓ |
| 1951 | William S. Beardsley (R) | William H. Nicholas (R) | Melvin D. Synhorst (R) | Robert L. Larson (R) | C. B. (Chet) Akers (R) | M. L. Abrahamson (R) | Clyde Spry (R) | 41R, 9D | 93R, 15D | Guy Gillette (D) | Bourke B. Hickenlooper (R) | 8R | Harry S. Truman/ Alben W. Barkley (D) ✓ |
| 1952 | William S. Beardsley (R) | William H. Nicholas (R) | Melvin D. Synhorst (R) | Robert L. Larson (R) | C. B. (Chet) Akers (R) | M. L. Abrahamson (R) | Clyde Spry (R) | 41R, 9D | 93R, 15D | Guy Gillette (D) | Bourke B. Hickenlooper (R) | 8R | Dwight D. Eisenhower/ Richard Nixon (R) ✓ |
| 1953 | William S. Beardsley (R) | Leo Elthon (R) | Melvin D. Synhorst (R) | Leo Hoegh (R) | C. B. (Chet) Akers (R) | M. L. Abrahamson (R) | Clyde Spry (R) | 46R, 4D | 105R, 3D | Guy Gillette (D) | Bourke B. Hickenlooper (R) | 8R | Dwight D. Eisenhower/ Richard Nixon (R) ✓ |
| 1954 | William S. Beardsley (R) | Leo Elthon (R) | Melvin D. Synhorst (R) | Leo Hoegh (R) | C. B. (Chet) Akers (R) | M. L. Abrahamson (R) | Clyde Spry (R) | 46R, 4D | 105R, 3D | Guy Gillette (D) | Bourke B. Hickenlooper (R) | 8R | Dwight D. Eisenhower/ Richard Nixon (R) ✓ |
| 1955 | Leo Hoegh (R) | Leo Elthon (R) | Melvin D. Synhorst (R) | Dayton Countryman (R) | C. B. (Chet) Akers (R) | M. L. Abrahamson (R) | Clyde Spry (R) | 44R, 6D | 90R, 18D | Thomas E. Martin (R) | Bourke B. Hickenlooper (R) | 8R | Dwight D. Eisenhower/ Richard Nixon (R) ✓ |
| 1956 | Leo Hoegh (R) | Leo Elthon (R) | Melvin D. Synhorst (R) | Dayton Countryman (R) | C. B. (Chet) Akers (R) | M. L. Abrahamson (R) | Clyde Spry (R) | 44R, 6D | 90R, 18D | Thomas E. Martin (R) | Bourke B. Hickenlooper (R) | 8R | Dwight D. Eisenhower/ Richard Nixon (R) ✓ |
| 1957 | Herschel C. Loveless (D) | William H. Nicholas (R) | Melvin D. Synhorst (R) | Norman A. Erbe (R) | C. B. (Chet) Akers (R) | M. L. Abrahamson (R) | Clyde Spry (R) | 40R, 10D | 71R, 37D | Thomas E. Martin (R) | Bourke B. Hickenlooper (R) | 7R, 1D | Dwight D. Eisenhower/ Richard Nixon (R) ✓ |
| 1958 | Herschel C. Loveless (D) | William H. Nicholas (R) | Melvin D. Synhorst (R) | Norman A. Erbe (R) | C. B. (Chet) Akers (R) | M. L. Abrahamson (R) | Clyde Spry (R) | 40R, 10D | 71R, 37D | Thomas E. Martin (R) | Bourke B. Hickenlooper (R) | 7R, 1D | Dwight D. Eisenhower/ Richard Nixon (R) ✓ |
| 1959 | Herschel C. Loveless (D) | Edward J. McManus (D) | Melvin D. Synhorst (R) | Norman A. Erbe (R) | C. B. (Chet) Akers (R) | M. L. Abrahamson (R) | Clyde Spry (R) | 33R, 17D | 58R, 50D | Thomas E. Martin (R) | Bourke B. Hickenlooper (R) | 4D, 4R | Dwight D. Eisenhower/ Richard Nixon (R) ✓ |
| 1960 | Herschel C. Loveless (D) | Edward J. McManus (D) | Melvin D. Synhorst (R) | Norman A. Erbe (R) | C. B. (Chet) Akers (R) | M. L. Abrahamson (R) | Clyde Spry (R) | 33R, 17D | 58R, 50D | Thomas E. Martin (R) | Bourke B. Hickenlooper (R) | 5R, 3D | Richard Nixon/ Henry Cabot Lodge Jr. (R) ✗ |
| 1961 | Norman A. Erbe (R) | W. L. Mooty (R) | Melvin D. Synhorst (R) | Evan Hultman (R) | C. B. (Chet) Akers (R) | M. L. Abrahamson (R) | L. B. Liddy (R) | 35R, 15D | 78R, 30D | Jack Miller (R) | Bourke B. Hickenlooper (R) | 6R, 2D | Richard Nixon/ Henry Cabot Lodge Jr. (R) ✗ |
| 1962 | Norman A. Erbe (R) | W. L. Mooty (R) | Melvin D. Synhorst (R) | Evan Hultman (R) | C. B. (Chet) Akers (R) | M. L. Abrahamson (R) | L. B. Liddy (R) | 35R, 15D | 78R, 30D | Jack Miller (R) | Bourke B. Hickenlooper (R) | 6R, 2D | Richard Nixon/ Henry Cabot Lodge Jr. (R) ✗ |
| 1963 | Harold Hughes (D) | W. L. Mooty (R) | Melvin D. Synhorst (R) | Evan Hultman (R) | C. B. (Chet) Akers (R) | M. L. Abrahamson (R) | L. B. Liddy (R) | 38R, 12D | 78R, 30D | Jack Miller (R) | Bourke B. Hickenlooper (R) | 6R, 1D | Richard Nixon/ Henry Cabot Lodge Jr. (R) ✗ |
| 1964 | Harold Hughes (D) | W. L. Mooty (R) | Melvin D. Synhorst (R) | Evan Hultman (R) | C. B. (Chet) Akers (R) | M. L. Abrahamson (R) | L. B. Liddy (R) | 38R, 12D | 78R, 30D | Jack Miller (R) | Bourke B. Hickenlooper (R) | 6R, 1D | Lyndon B. Johnson/ Hubert Humphrey (D) ✓ |
| 1965 | Harold Hughes (D) | Robert D. Fulton (D) | Gary L. Cameron (D) | Lawrence F. Scalise (D) | Lorne R. Worthington (D) | Paul Franzenburg (D) | Kenneth E. Owen (D) | 34D, 25R | 101D, 23R | Jack Miller (R) | Bourke B. Hickenlooper (R) | 6D, 1R | Lyndon B. Johnson/ Hubert Humphrey (D) ✓ |
| 1966 | Harold Hughes (D) | Robert D. Fulton (D) | Gary L. Cameron (D) | Lawrence F. Scalise (D) | Lorne R. Worthington (D) | Paul Franzenburg (D) | Kenneth E. Owen (D) | 34D, 25R | 101D, 23R | Jack Miller (R) | Bourke B. Hickenlooper (R) | 6D, 1R | Lyndon B. Johnson/ Hubert Humphrey (D) ✓ |
| 1967 | Harold Hughes (D) | Robert D. Fulton (D) | Melvin D. Synhorst (R) (Note: Resigned.) | Richard C. Turner (R) | Lloyd R. Smith (R) | Paul Franzenburg (D) | L. B. Liddy (R) | 32D, 29R | 89R, 35D | Jack Miller (R) | Bourke B. Hickenlooper (R) | 5R, 2D | Lyndon B. Johnson/ Hubert Humphrey (D) ✓ |
| 1968 | Harold Hughes (D) | Robert D. Fulton (D) | Melvin D. Synhorst (R) | Richard C. Turner (R) | Lloyd R. Smith (R) | Paul Franzenburg (D) | L. B. Liddy (R) | 32D, 29R | 89R, 35D | Jack Miller (R) | Bourke B. Hickenlooper (R) | 5R, 2D | Richard Nixon/ Spiro Agnew (R) ✓ |
| 1969 | Robert D. Ray (R) | Roger Jepsen (R) | Melvin D. Synhorst (R) | Richard C. Turner (R) | Lloyd R. Smith (R) | Maurice E. Baringer (R) | L. B. Liddy (R) | 44R, 17D | 86R, 38D | Jack Miller (R) | Harold Hughes (D) | 5R, 2D | Richard Nixon/ Spiro Agnew (R) ✓ |
| 1970 | Robert D. Ray (R) | Roger Jepsen (R) | Melvin D. Synhorst (R) | Richard C. Turner (R) | Lloyd R. Smith (R) | Maurice E. Baringer (R) | L. B. Liddy (R) | 44R, 17D | 86R, 38D | Jack Miller (R) | Harold Hughes (D) | 5R, 2D | Richard Nixon/ Spiro Agnew (R) ✓ |
| 1971 | Robert D. Ray (R) | Roger Jepsen (R) | Melvin D. Synhorst (R) | Richard C. Turner (R) | Lloyd R. Smith (R) | Maurice E. Baringer (R) | L. B. Liddy (R) | 38R, 12D | 63R, 37D | Jack Miller (R) | Harold Hughes (D) | 5R, 2D | Richard Nixon/ Spiro Agnew (R) ✓ |
| 1972 | Robert D. Ray (R) | Roger Jepsen (R) | Melvin D. Synhorst (R) | Richard C. Turner (R) | Lloyd R. Smith (R) | Maurice E. Baringer (R) | L. B. Liddy (R) | 38R, 12D | 63R, 37D | Jack Miller (R) | Harold Hughes (D) | 5R, 2D | Richard Nixon/ Spiro Agnew (R) ✓ |
| 1973 | Robert D. Ray (R) | Arthur Neu (R) | Melvin D. Synhorst (R) | Richard C. Turner (R) | Lloyd R. Smith (R) | Maurice E. Baringer (R) | Robert H. Lounsberry (R) | 28R, 22D | 57R, 43D | Dick Clark (D) | Harold Hughes (D) | 3D, 3R | Richard Nixon/ Spiro Agnew (R) ✓ |
| 1974 | Robert D. Ray (R) | Arthur Neu (R) | Melvin D. Synhorst (R) | Richard C. Turner (R) | Lloyd R. Smith (R) | Maurice E. Baringer (R) | Robert H. Lounsberry (R) | 28R, 22D | 57R, 43D | Dick Clark (D) | Harold Hughes (D) | 3D, 3R | Richard Nixon/ Spiro Agnew (R) ✓ |
| 1975 | Robert D. Ray (R) | Arthur Neu (R) | Melvin D. Synhorst (R) | Richard C. Turner (R) | Lloyd R. Smith (R) | Maurice E. Baringer (R) | Robert H. Lounsberry (R) | 26D, 24R | 61D, 39R | Dick Clark (D) | John Culver (D) | 5D, 1R | Richard Nixon/ Spiro Agnew (R) ✓ |
| 1976 | Robert D. Ray (R) | Arthur Neu (R) | Melvin D. Synhorst (R) | Richard C. Turner (R) | Lloyd R. Smith (R) | Maurice E. Baringer (R) | Robert H. Lounsberry (R) | 26D, 24R | 61D, 39R | Dick Clark (D) | John Culver (D) | 5D, 1R | Gerald Ford/ Bob Dole (R) ✗ |
| 1977 | Robert D. Ray (R) | Arthur Neu (R) | Melvin D. Synhorst (R) | Richard C. Turner (R) | Lloyd R. Smith (R) | Maurice E. Baringer (R) | Robert H. Lounsberry (R) | 26D, 24R | 59D, 41R | Dick Clark (D) | John Culver (D) | 4D, 2R | Gerald Ford/ Bob Dole (R) ✗ |
| 1978 | Robert D. Ray (R) | Arthur Neu (R) | Melvin D. Synhorst (R) | Richard C. Turner (R) | Lloyd R. Smith (R) | Maurice E. Baringer (R) | Robert H. Lounsberry (R) | 26D, 24R | 59D, 41R | Dick Clark (D) | John Culver (D) | 4D, 2R | Gerald Ford/ Bob Dole (R) ✗ |
| 1979 | Robert D. Ray (R) | Terry Branstad (R) | Melvin D. Synhorst (R) | Tom Miller (D) | Richard D. Johnson (R) | Maurice E. Baringer (R) | Robert H. Lounsberry (R) | 28R, 22D | 57R, 43D | Roger Jepsen (R) | John Culver (D) | 3D, 3R | Gerald Ford/ Bob Dole (R) ✗ |
| 1980 | Robert D. Ray (R) | Terry Branstad (R) | Melvin D. Synhorst (R) | Tom Miller (D) | Richard D. Johnson (R) | Maurice E. Baringer (R) | Robert H. Lounsberry (R) | 28R, 22D | 57R, 43D | Roger Jepsen (R) | John Culver (D) | 3D, 3R | Ronald Reagan/ George H. W. Bush (R) ✓ |
| 1981 | Robert D. Ray (R) | Terry Branstad (R) | Mary Jane Odell (R) | Tom Miller (D) | Richard D. Johnson (R) | Maurice E. Baringer (R) | Robert H. Lounsberry (R) | 29R, 21D | 58R, 42D | Roger Jepsen (R) | Chuck Grassley (R) | 3D, 3R | Ronald Reagan/ George H. W. Bush (R) ✓ |
| 1982 | Robert D. Ray (R) | Terry Branstad (R) | Mary Jane Odell (R) | Tom Miller (D) | Richard D. Johnson (R) | Maurice E. Baringer (R) | Robert H. Lounsberry (R) | 29R, 21D | 58R, 42D | Roger Jepsen (R) | Chuck Grassley (R) | 3D, 3R | Ronald Reagan/ George H. W. Bush (R) ✓ |
| 1983 | Terry Branstad (R) | Robert T. Anderson (D) | Mary Jane Odell (R) | Tom Miller (D) | Richard D. Johnson (R) | Michael Fitzgerald (D) | Robert H. Lounsberry (R) | 28D, 22R | 60D, 40R | Roger Jepsen (R) | Chuck Grassley (R) | 3D, 3R | Ronald Reagan/ George H. W. Bush (R) ✓ |
| 1984 | Terry Branstad (R) | Robert T. Anderson (D) | Mary Jane Odell (R) | Tom Miller (D) | Richard D. Johnson (R) | Michael Fitzgerald (D) | Robert H. Lounsberry (R) | 28D, 22R | 60D, 40R | Roger Jepsen (R) | Chuck Grassley (R) | 3D, 3R | Ronald Reagan/ George H. W. Bush (R) ✓ |
| 1985 | Terry Branstad (R) | Robert T. Anderson (D) | Mary Jane Odell (R) | Tom Miller (D) | Richard D. Johnson (R) | Michael Fitzgerald (D) | Robert H. Lounsberry (R) | 29D, 21R | 60D, 40R | Tom Harkin (D) | Chuck Grassley (R) | 4R, 2D | Ronald Reagan/ George H. W. Bush (R) ✓ |
| 1986 | Terry Branstad (R) | Robert T. Anderson (D) | Mary Jane Odell (R) | Tom Miller (D) | Richard D. Johnson (R) | Michael Fitzgerald (D) | Robert H. Lounsberry (R) | 29D, 21R | 60D, 40R | Tom Harkin (D) | Chuck Grassley (R) | 4R, 2D | Ronald Reagan/ George H. W. Bush (R) ✓ |
| 1987 | Terry Branstad (R) | Jo Ann Zimmerman (D) | Elaine Baxter (D) | Tom Miller (D) | Richard D. Johnson (R) | Michael Fitzgerald (D) | Dale M. Cochran (D) | 30D, 20R | 58D, 42R | Tom Harkin (D) | Chuck Grassley (R) | 4R, 2D | Ronald Reagan/ George H. W. Bush (R) ✓ |
| 1988 | Terry Branstad (R) | Jo Ann Zimmerman (D) | Elaine Baxter (D) | Tom Miller (D) | Richard D. Johnson (R) | Michael Fitzgerald (D) | Dale M. Cochran (D) | 30D, 20R | 58D, 42R | Tom Harkin (D) | Chuck Grassley (R) | 4R, 2D | Michael Dukakis/ Lloyd Bentsen (D) ✗ |
| 1989 | Terry Branstad (R) | Jo Ann Zimmerman (D) | Elaine Baxter (D) | Tom Miller (D) | Richard D. Johnson (R) | Michael Fitzgerald (D) | Dale M. Cochran (D) | 30D, 20R | 61D, 39R | Tom Harkin (D) | Chuck Grassley (R) | 4R, 2D | Michael Dukakis/ Lloyd Bentsen (D) ✗ |
| 1990 | Terry Branstad (R) | Jo Ann Zimmerman (D) | Elaine Baxter (D) | Tom Miller (D) | Richard D. Johnson (R) | Michael Fitzgerald (D) | Dale M. Cochran (D) | 30D, 20R | 61D, 39R | Tom Harkin (D) | Chuck Grassley (R) | 4R, 2D | Michael Dukakis/ Lloyd Bentsen (D) ✗ |
| 1991 | Terry Branstad (R) | Joy Corning (R) | Elaine Baxter (D) | Bonnie Campbell (D) | Richard D. Johnson (R) | Michael Fitzgerald (D) | Dale M. Cochran (D) | 28D, 22R | 53D, 47R | Tom Harkin (D) | Chuck Grassley (R) | 4R, 2D | Michael Dukakis/ Lloyd Bentsen (D) ✗ |
| 1992 | Terry Branstad (R) | Joy Corning (R) | Elaine Baxter (D) | Bonnie Campbell (D) | Richard D. Johnson (R) | Michael Fitzgerald (D) | Dale M. Cochran (D) | 28D, 22R | 53D, 47R | Tom Harkin (D) | Chuck Grassley (R) | 4R, 2D | Bill Clinton/ Al Gore (D) ✓ |
| 1993 | Terry Branstad (R) | Joy Corning (R) | Elaine Baxter (D) | Bonnie Campbell (D) | Richard D. Johnson (R) | Michael Fitzgerald (D) | Dale M. Cochran (D) | 26D, 24R | 51R, 49D | Tom Harkin (D) | Chuck Grassley (R) | 4R, 1D | Bill Clinton/ Al Gore (D) ✓ |
| 1994 | Terry Branstad (R) | Joy Corning (R) | Elaine Baxter (D) | Bonnie Campbell (D) | Richard D. Johnson (R) | Michael Fitzgerald (D) | Dale M. Cochran (D) | 26D, 24R | 51R, 49D | Tom Harkin (D) | Chuck Grassley (R) | 4R, 1D | Bill Clinton/ Al Gore (D) ✓ |
| 1995 | Terry Branstad (R) | Joy Corning (R) | Paul Pate (R) | Tom Miller (D) | Richard D. Johnson (R) | Michael Fitzgerald (D) | Dale M. Cochran (D) | 27D, 23R | 64R, 36D | Tom Harkin (D) | Chuck Grassley (R) | 5R | Bill Clinton/ Al Gore (D) ✓ |
| 1996 | Terry Branstad (R) | Joy Corning (R) | Paul Pate (R) | Tom Miller (D) | Richard D. Johnson (R) | Michael Fitzgerald (D) | Dale M. Cochran (D) | 27D, 23R | 64R, 36D | Tom Harkin (D) | Chuck Grassley (R) | 5R | Bill Clinton/ Al Gore (D) ✓ |
| 1997 | Terry Branstad (R) | Joy Corning (R) | Paul Pate (R) | Tom Miller (D) | Richard D. Johnson (R) | Michael Fitzgerald (D) | Dale M. Cochran (D) | 29R, 21D | 54R, 46D | Tom Harkin (D) | Chuck Grassley (R) | 4R, 1D | Bill Clinton/ Al Gore (D) ✓ |
| 1998 | Terry Branstad (R) | Joy Corning (R) | Paul Pate (R) | Tom Miller (D) | Richard D. Johnson (R) | Michael Fitzgerald (D) | Dale M. Cochran (D) | 29R, 21D | 54R, 46D | Tom Harkin (D) | Chuck Grassley (R) | 4R, 1D | Bill Clinton/ Al Gore (D) ✓ |
| 1999 | Tom Vilsack (D) | Sally Pederson (D) | Chet Culver (D) | Tom Miller (D) | Richard D. Johnson (R) | Michael Fitzgerald (D) | Patty Judge (D) | 30R, 20D | 56R, 44D | Tom Harkin (D) | Chuck Grassley (R) | 4R, 1D | Bill Clinton/ Al Gore (D) ✓ |
| 2000 | Tom Vilsack (D) | Sally Pederson (D) | Chet Culver (D) | Tom Miller (D) | Richard D. Johnson (R) | Michael Fitzgerald (D) | Patty Judge (D) | 30R, 20D | 56R, 44D | Tom Harkin (D) | Chuck Grassley (R) | 4R, 1D | Al Gore/ Joe Lieberman (D) ✗ |
| 2001 | Tom Vilsack (D) | Sally Pederson (D) | Chet Culver (D) | Tom Miller (D) | Richard D. Johnson (R) | Michael Fitzgerald (D) | Patty Judge (D) | 30R, 20D | 56R, 44D | Tom Harkin (D) | Chuck Grassley (R) | 4R, 1D | Al Gore/ Joe Lieberman (D) ✗ |
| 2002 | Tom Vilsack (D) | Sally Pederson (D) | Chet Culver (D) | Tom Miller (D) | Richard D. Johnson (R) | Michael Fitzgerald (D) | Patty Judge (D) | 30R, 20D | 56R, 44D | Tom Harkin (D) | Chuck Grassley (R) | 4R, 1D | Al Gore/ Joe Lieberman (D) ✗ |
| 2003 | Tom Vilsack (D) | Sally Pederson (D) | Chet Culver (D) | Tom Miller (D) | David A. Vaudt (R) | Michael Fitzgerald (D) | Patty Judge (D) | 29R, 21D | 54R, 46D | Tom Harkin (D) | Chuck Grassley (R) | 4R, 1D | Al Gore/ Joe Lieberman (D) ✗ |
| 2004 | Tom Vilsack (D) | Sally Pederson (D) | Chet Culver (D) | Tom Miller (D) | David A. Vaudt (R) | Michael Fitzgerald (D) | Patty Judge (D) | 29R, 21D | 54R, 46D | Tom Harkin (D) | Chuck Grassley (R) | 4R, 1D | George W. Bush/ Dick Cheney (R) ✓ |
| 2005 | Tom Vilsack (D) | Sally Pederson (D) | Chet Culver (D) | Tom Miller (D) | David A. Vaudt (R) | Michael Fitzgerald (D) | Patty Judge (D) | 25D, 25R | 51R, 49D | Tom Harkin (D) | Chuck Grassley (R) | 4R, 1D | George W. Bush/ Dick Cheney (R) ✓ |
| 2006 | Tom Vilsack (D) | Sally Pederson (D) | Chet Culver (D) | Tom Miller (D) | David A. Vaudt (R) | Michael Fitzgerald (D) | Patty Judge (D) | 25D, 25R | 51R, 49D | Tom Harkin (D) | Chuck Grassley (R) | 4R, 1D | George W. Bush/ Dick Cheney (R) ✓ |
| 2007 | Chet Culver (D) | Patty Judge (D) | Michael Mauro (D) | Tom Miller (D) | David A. Vaudt (R) | Michael Fitzgerald (D) | Bill Northey (R) (Note: Resigned after U.S. Senate confirmation as United States Under Secretary of Agriculture for Farm and Foreign Agricultural Services.) | 30D, 20R | 54D, 46R | Tom Harkin (D) | Chuck Grassley (R) | 3D, 2R | George W. Bush/ Dick Cheney (R) ✓ |
| 2008 | Chet Culver (D) | Patty Judge (D) | Michael Mauro (D) | Tom Miller (D) | David A. Vaudt (R) | Michael Fitzgerald (D) | Bill Northey (R) | 30D, 20R | 54D, 46R | Tom Harkin (D) | Chuck Grassley (R) | 3D, 2R | Barack Obama/ Joe Biden (D) ✓ |
| 2009 | Chet Culver (D) | Patty Judge (D) | Michael Mauro (D) | Tom Miller (D) | David A. Vaudt (R) | Michael Fitzgerald (D) | Bill Northey (R) | 32D, 18R | 57D, 43R | Tom Harkin (D) | Chuck Grassley (R) | 3D, 2R | Barack Obama/ Joe Biden (D) ✓ |
| 2010 | Chet Culver (D) | Patty Judge (D) | Michael Mauro (D) | Tom Miller (D) | David A. Vaudt (R) | Michael Fitzgerald (D) | Bill Northey (R) | 32D, 18R | 57D, 43R | Tom Harkin (D) | Chuck Grassley (R) | 3D, 2R | Barack Obama/ Joe Biden (D) ✓ |
| 2011 | Terry Branstad (R) (Note: Resigned upon U.S. Senate confirmation to be the ambassador to China.) | Kim Reynolds (R) | Matt Schultz (R) | Tom Miller (D) | David A. Vaudt (R) | Michael Fitzgerald (D) | Bill Northey (R) | 26D, 24R | 60R, 40D | Tom Harkin (D) | Chuck Grassley (R) | 3D, 2R | Barack Obama/ Joe Biden (D) ✓ |
| 2012 | Terry Branstad (R) | Kim Reynolds (R) | Matt Schultz (R) | Tom Miller (D) | David A. Vaudt (R) | Michael Fitzgerald (D) | Bill Northey (R) | 26D, 24R | 60R, 40D | Tom Harkin (D) | Chuck Grassley (R) | 3D, 2R | Barack Obama/ Joe Biden (D) ✓ |
| 2013 | Terry Branstad (R) | Kim Reynolds (R) | Matt Schultz (R) | Tom Miller (D) | David A. Vaudt (R) | Michael Fitzgerald (D) | Bill Northey (R) | 26D, 24R | 53R, 47D | Tom Harkin (D) | Chuck Grassley (R) | 2D, 2R | Barack Obama/ Joe Biden (D) ✓ |
| 2013 | Terry Branstad (R) | Kim Reynolds (R) | Matt Schultz (R) | Tom Miller (D) | Mary Mosiman (R) | Michael Fitzgerald (D) | Bill Northey (R) | 26D, 24R | 53R, 47D | Tom Harkin (D) | Chuck Grassley (R) | 2D, 2R | Barack Obama/ Joe Biden (D) ✓ |
| 2014 | Terry Branstad (R) | Kim Reynolds (R) | Matt Schultz (R) | Tom Miller (D) | Mary Mosiman (R) | Michael Fitzgerald (D) | Bill Northey (R) | 26D, 24R | 53R, 47D | Tom Harkin (D) | Chuck Grassley (R) | 2D, 2R | Barack Obama/ Joe Biden (D) ✓ |
| 2015 | Terry Branstad (R) | Kim Reynolds (R) | Paul Pate (R) | Tom Miller (D) | Mary Mosiman (R) | Michael Fitzgerald (D) | Bill Northey (R) | 26D, 24R | 57R, 43D | Joni Ernst (R) | Chuck Grassley (R) | 3R, 1D | Barack Obama/ Joe Biden (D) ✓ |
| 2016 | Terry Branstad (R) | Kim Reynolds (R) | Paul Pate (R) | Tom Miller (D) | Mary Mosiman (R) | Michael Fitzgerald (D) | Bill Northey (R) | 26D, 24R | 57R, 43D | Joni Ernst (R) | Chuck Grassley (R) | 3R, 1D | Donald Trump/ Mike Pence (R) ✓ |
| 2017 | Terry Branstad (R) | Kim Reynolds (R) | Paul Pate (R) | Tom Miller (D) | Mary Mosiman (R) | Michael Fitzgerald (D) | Bill Northey (R) | 29R, 20D, 1I | 59R, 41D | Joni Ernst (R) | Chuck Grassley (R) | 3R, 1D | Donald Trump/ Mike Pence (R) ✓ |
| 2017 | Kim Reynolds (R) | Adam Gregg (R) | Paul Pate (R) | Tom Miller (D) | Mary Mosiman (R) | Michael Fitzgerald (D) | Bill Northey (R) | 29R, 20D, 1I | 59R, 41D | Joni Ernst (R) | Chuck Grassley (R) | 3R, 1D | Donald Trump/ Mike Pence (R) ✓ |
| 2018 | Kim Reynolds (R) | Adam Gregg (R) | Paul Pate (R) | Tom Miller (D) | Mary Mosiman (R) | Michael Fitzgerald (D) | Mike Naig (R) | 29R, 20D, 1I | 59R, 41D | Joni Ernst (R) | Chuck Grassley (R) | 3R, 1D | Donald Trump/ Mike Pence (R) ✓ |
| 2019 | Kim Reynolds (R) | Adam Gregg (R) | Paul Pate (R) | Tom Miller (D) | Rob Sand (D) | Michael Fitzgerald (D) | Mike Naig (R) | 32R, 18D | 53R, 47D | Joni Ernst (R) | Chuck Grassley (R) | 3D, 1R | Donald Trump/ Mike Pence (R) ✓ |
| 2020 | Kim Reynolds (R) | Adam Gregg (R) | Paul Pate (R) | Tom Miller (D) | Rob Sand (D) | Michael Fitzgerald (D) | Mike Naig (R) | 32R, 18D | 53R, 47D | Joni Ernst (R) | Chuck Grassley (R) | 3D, 1R | Donald Trump/ Mike Pence (R) ✗ |
| 2021 | Kim Reynolds (R) | Adam Gregg (R) | Paul Pate (R) | Tom Miller (D) | Rob Sand (D) | Michael Fitzgerald (D) | Mike Naig (R) | 32R, 18D | 59R, 41D | Joni Ernst (R) | Chuck Grassley (R) | 3R, 1D | Donald Trump/ Mike Pence (R) ✗ |
| 2022 | Kim Reynolds (R) | Adam Gregg (R) | Paul Pate (R) | Tom Miller (D) | Rob Sand (D) | Michael Fitzgerald (D) | Mike Naig (R) | 32R, 18D | 60R, 40D (Note: Jon Dunwell won a special election in the 29th district on October 12, 2021, flipping it from Democratic to Republican.) | Joni Ernst (R) | Chuck Grassley (R) | 3R, 1D | Donald Trump/ Mike Pence (R) ✗ |
| 2023 | Kim Reynolds (R) | Adam Gregg (R) | Paul Pate (R) | Brenna Bird (R) | Rob Sand (D) | Roby Smith (R) | Mike Naig (R) | 34R, 16D (Note: Republicans gained one seat as a result of the 2024 election, but they subsequently lost a seats in a special election.) | 64R, 36D | Joni Ernst (R) | Chuck Grassley (R) | 4R | Donald Trump/ Mike Pence (R) ✗ |
| 2024 | Kim Reynolds (R) | Adam Gregg (R) | Paul Pate (R) | Brenna Bird (R) | Rob Sand (D) | Roby Smith (R) | Mike Naig (R) | 34R, 16D | 64R, 36D | Joni Ernst (R) | Chuck Grassley (R) | 4R | Donald Trump/ JD Vance (R) ✓ |
| 2025 | Kim Reynolds (R) | Chris Cournoyer (R) | Paul Pate (R) | Brenna Bird (R) | Rob Sand (D) | Roby Smith (R) | Mike Naig (R) | 34R, 16D | 67R, 33D | Joni Ernst (R) | Chuck Grassley (R) | 4R | Donald Trump/ JD Vance (R) ✓ |
| 2026 | Kim Reynolds (R) | Chris Cournoyer (R) | Paul Pate (R) | Brenna Bird (R) | Rob Sand (D) | Roby Smith (R) | Mike Naig (R) | 33R, 17D | 67R, 33D | Joni Ernst (R) | Chuck Grassley (R) | 4R | Donald Trump/ JD Vance (R) ✓ |
| 2027 | Rob Sand (D) | Dave Muhlbauer (D) | Paul Pate (R) | Nathan Willems (D) | Taylor Wettach (D) | Roby Smith (R) | Mike Naig (R) | 32R, 18D | 56R, 44D | Josh Turek (D) | Chuck Grassley (R) | 3D, 1R | Donald Trump/ JD Vance (R) ✓ |

== See also ==
- Governor of Iowa
- Elections in Iowa
