= John Fletcher (Iowa politician) =

American politician and lawyer (1876-1968

Ben Gibson

18th Attorney General of Iowa
- In office January 3, 1927 – January 1, 1933
- Governor: John Hammill; Dan W. Turner
- Preceded by: Ben Gibson
- Succeeded by: Edward L. O'Connor

District Court Judge of Polk County
- In office May 8, 1925 – January 1, 1927

Assistant Attorney General of Iowa
- In office January 29, 1910 – May 8, 1925
- Preceded by: Charles S. Wilcox

Personal details
- Born: January 5, 1876 Scott County, Iowa
- Died: February 26, 1968 (aged 92) Altoona, Iowa
- Party: Republican
- Spouse: Marie D. Schmidt (m. 1905; died 1924)
- Children: 3
- Education: Iowa State Teachers College; University of Iowa Law School

John Fletcher (January 5, 1876 – February 26, 1968) was the Attorney General of Iowa from 1927 to 1933.

== Early life ==
Fletcher was born in Scott County, Iowa. He attended the Iowa State Teachers College, later called the University of Northern Iowa, then attended University of Iowa Law School. He was admitted to the bar on May 8, 1899.

== Politics ==
=== Assistant Attorney General ===
Fletcher was hired on January 29, 1910 by Attorney General H. W. Byers as an Assistant Attorney General. He worked under Byers, Attorney General George Cosson and Attorney General Benjamin J. Gibson. He left the Attorney General's office in May, 1925 when he was appointed, by Governor John Hammill to be a District Court judge in Polk County. He remained a judge until his election to Attorney General. He assumed the office in January 1927.

=== Attorney General ===
In 1929, he ruled that a $100 million bond issued for primary roads was invalid. This stirred controversy, but his ruling was upheld by the Iowa Supreme Court.

== Personal life ==
He married Marie D. Schmidt on June 14, 1905. They had three children, Maurice, Warren and Margaret. Marie died at age 44 on May 3, 1924 after a long illness, in Des Moines.

John survived his wife by 44 years, dying of arteriosclerosis at age 92, on February 26, 1968 in Altoona.

Legal offices
Preceded by Ben Gibson	Attorney General of Iowa; 1927-1933	Succeeded by Edward L. O'Connor
