= Attorney General Mullan =

Attorney General Mullan may refer to:

- Charles W. Mullan (1845–1919), Attorney General of Iowa
- John Mullan (Australian politician) (1871–1941), Attorney-General of Queensland
