= 1964 Iowa gubernatorial election =

- November 3, 1964
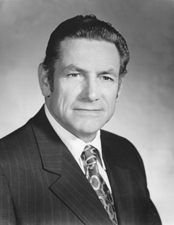

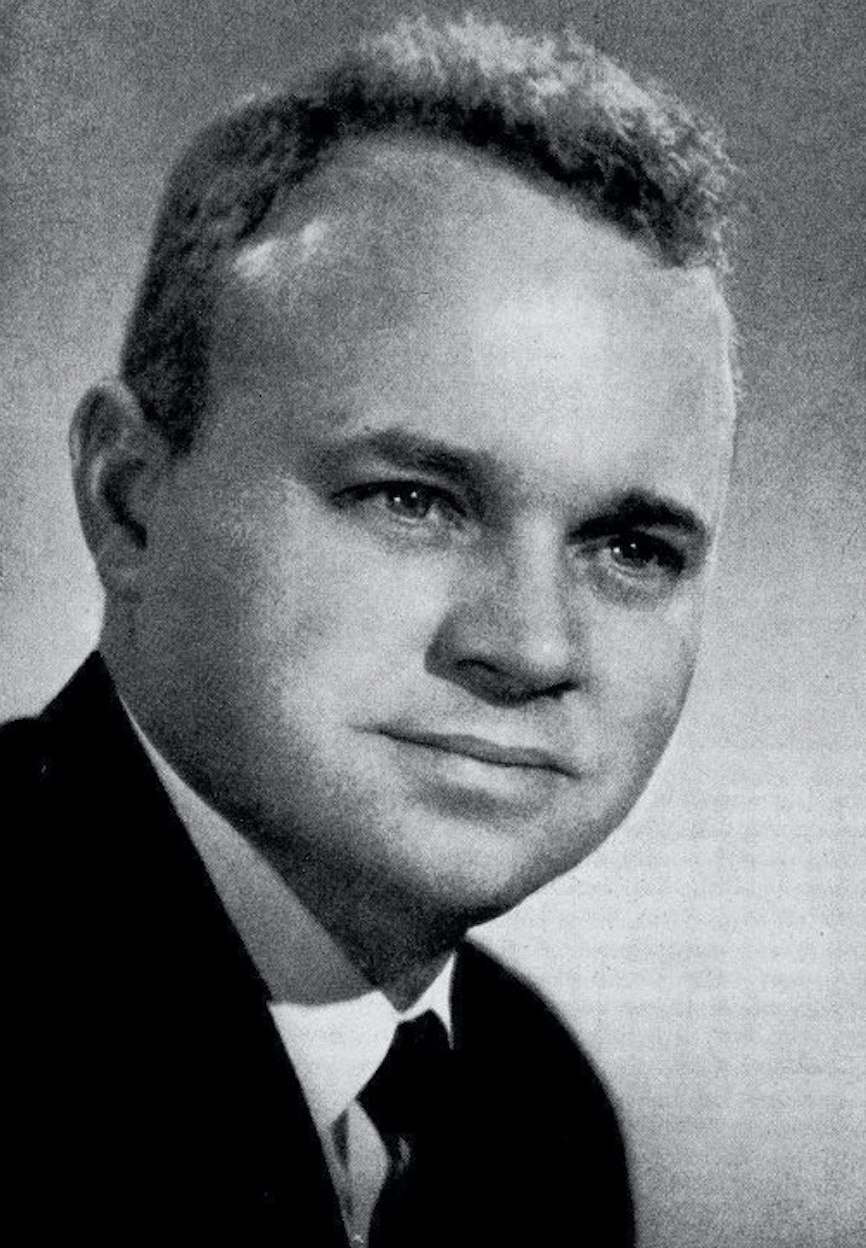
Nominee	Harold Hughes	Evan Hultman
Party	Democratic	Republican
Popular vote	794,610	365,131
Percentage	68.05%	31.27%
- County results Hughes: 50–60% 60–70% 70–80% Hultman: 50–60%
Governor before election
Harold Hughes
Democratic
Elected Governor
Harold Hughes
Democratic

The 1964 Iowa gubernatorial election was held on November 3, 1964. Incumbent Democrat Harold Hughes defeated Republican nominee Evan Hultman with 68.05% of the vote.

== Primary elections ==
Primary elections were held on June 1, 1964.

=== Democratic primary ===
==== Candidates ====
- Harold Hughes, incumbent Governor

==== Results ====
Democratic primary results
Party	Candidate	Votes	%
Democratic	Harold Hughes (incumbent)	103,947	100.00
Total votes		103,947	100.00

=== Republican primary ===
==== Candidates ====
- Evan Hultman, Attorney General of Iowa

==== Results ====
Republican primary results
Party	Candidate	Votes	%
Republican	Evan Hultman	163,523	100.00
Total votes		163,523	100.00

== General election ==
=== Candidates ===
Major party candidates

- Harold Hughes, Democratic
- Evan Hultman, Republican

Other candidates

- Robert D. Dilley, Independent

=== Results ===
1964 Iowa gubernatorial election
Party	Candidate	Votes	%	±%
Democratic	Harold Hughes (incumbent)	794,610	68.05%	
Republican	Evan Hultman	365,131	31.27%	
Independent	Robert D. Dilley	7,985	0.68%	
Majority		429,479		
Turnout		1,167,734		
Democratic hold		Swing		
