= Attorney General Rankin =

Attorney General Rankin may refer to:

- John M. Rankin (1873–1947), Attorney General of Iowa
- Wellington D. Rankin (1884–1966), Attorney General of Montana
