= Edward L. O'Connor =

American lawyer and politician (1891-1973)

Edward O'Connor

19th Attorney General of Iowa
- In office January 3, 1933 – January 1, 1937
- Governor: Dan W. Turner; Clyde L. Herring
- Preceded by: John Fletcher
- Succeeded by: John H. Mitchell

Johnson County Attorney
- In office January 1, 1923 – January 1, 1927
- Succeeded by: C. B. Russell

Personal details
- Born: February 1, 1891 Fremont Township, Johnson County, Iowa
- Died: June 21, 1973 (aged 82) Tipton, Iowa
- Party: Democrat
- Spouse: Frances Florence Freeman (m. 1917; died 1970)
- Children: 4
- Education: University of Iowa, (BA,LLB,JD)

Military service
- Years of service: 1917-1919
- Rank: First Lieutenant
- Battles/wars: World War I

Edward Louis O'Connor (February 1, 1891 – June 21, 1973) was the Attorney General of Iowa from 1933 to 1937.

== Early life and education ==
O'Connor was born in Fremont to Patrick O'Connor and Nora (Cranly) O'Connor. O'Connor went to Lone Tree high school. Then attended University of Iowa, where he received his Bachelor's in education in 1913, Bachelor of Laws in 1920 and Juris Doctor in 1924.

From 1913 to 1915, he served as superintendent of the schools in Burt, Iowa.

== Career ==
He was admitted to the bar in 1920 and practiced in Iowa City from 1920 to 1933. He served as Johnson County Attorney from 1923 to 1927. He was sworn in on January 1, 1923 as the Johnson County Attorney. He later became the president of the Johnson County Bar Association in 1932.

=== 1932 Election ===
On June 6, 1932, Mitchell ran in the primary election for Attorney General of Iowa, winning with 52,684 votes. On November 8, 1932, Mitchell won the general election, winning with 475,546 votes.

=== 1934 Election ===
On June 4, 1934, he ran in the primary election and won with 110,758 votes. On November 6, 1934, he ran in the general election and won re-election with 425,391 votes.

=== Indictment ===
On July 3, 1935, O'Connor, along with his Assistant Attorney General, Walter Maley, and 16 others were indicted for charges of corruption, grafting and running a slot machine gambling syndicate. He was later acquitted.

=== Supreme Court Elections ===
In 1952, O'Connor ran for a seat on the Iowa Supreme Court, but lost with 447,176 votes compared to the winner's 702,090 votes. He ran again in 1960, losing with 539,126 votes compared to the winner's 651,571 votes.

== World War I ==
He served from May 17, 1917, to February 9, 1919, in World War I, serving as a First Lieutenant in the Field Artillery.

== Personal life ==
He married Frances Florence Freeman on November 7, 1917. They had 4 children, Edward L. Jr., Martin, Katherine and Marian.

Frances died on March 24, 1970, in Tipton, Iowa. O'Connor died on June 21, 1973, in Tipton.

Legal offices
Preceded by John Fletcher	Attorney General of Iowa; 1933–1937	Succeeded by John H. Mitchell
