= John H. Mitchell (Iowa politician) =

American lawyer and politician (1899-1992)

John Mitchell
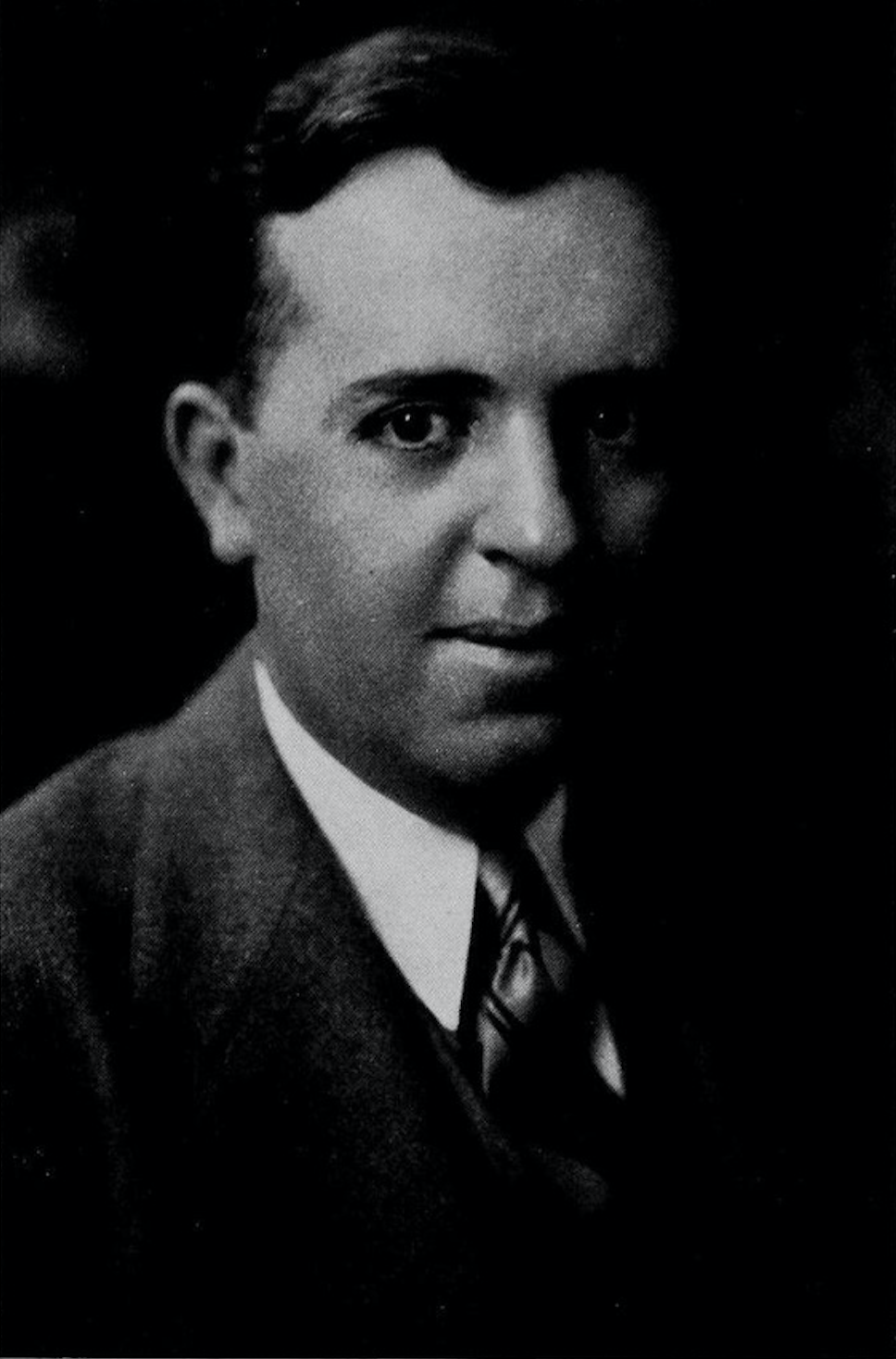

20th Attorney General of Iowa
- In office January 1, 1937 – 1939
- Governor: Clyde L. Herring; Nelson G. Kraschel
- Preceded by: Edward L. O'Connor
- Succeeded by: Fred D. Everett

Speaker of the Iowa House of Representatives
- In office January 14, 1935 – January 10, 1937
- Preceded by: George E. Miller
- Succeeded by: Lamar P. Foster

Member of the Iowa House of Representatives from the 62nd district
- In office January 9, 1933 – January 10, 1937

Personal details
- Born: November 5, 1899 Fort Dodge, Iowa
- Died: April 20, 1992 (aged 92)
- Party: Democrat
- Spouse(s): Ruth Jaqua (m. 1927; died 1979) Helen McCarville
- Children: 2

John H. Mitchell (November 5, 1899 – April 20, 1992) was the Attorney General of Iowa from 1937 to 1939.

== Early life and education ==
Mitchell was born in Fort Dodge, Iowa to Michael Mitchell and Ruth (Howard) Mitchell. Mitchell went to Corpus Christi elementary school in Fort Dodge, then graduated from Fort Dodge High school in 1918. He then went to Loras College, then known as Columbia College, and served in the Student Army Training Corps. Mitchell switched to University of Iowa and graduated there. He joined the Sigma Chi and Phi Delta Phi fraternities.

He was admitted to the Iowa bar in 1923. Mitchell practiced law in Humboldt, Iowa until 1927. He then joined his father, in Fort Dodge, at his practice, Mitchell and Mitchell.

== Politics ==
From 1933 to 1937, Mitchell served in the Iowa House of Representatives and served as speaker of the Iowa House of Representatives from 1935 to 1937. Mitchell was a Democrat. He then served as Iowa Attorney General from 1937 to 1939. Mitchell moved back to Fort Dodge and continued to practiced law.

He served as a referee in bankruptcies in the Northern District of Iowa.

== School Board ==
Mitchell served as a board member of the Fort Dodge Community School District from 1945 to 1961 and as Director of the Webster County School Board from 1961 to 1966. He then served as President of the Iowa Central Community College from 1966 to 1976.

== Personal life ==
In February 1929, Mitchell married Ruth Jaqua. They had two daughters, Martha and Jean. Ruth died in 1979. Mitchell remarried to Helen McCarville.

He was an American Legion Commander in Humboldt and in 1927 was made the 10th District Commander.

Mitchell died in Fort Dodge, Iowa from cancer in 1992.

=== Legacy ===
A dormitory at Iowa Central Community College is named Mitchell Hall in his honor.

Legal offices
Preceded by Edward L. O'Connor	Attorney General of Iowa; 1937–1938	Succeeded by Fred D. Everett
