= Horace M. Havner =

American politician and lawyer

H. M. Havner

16th Attorney General of Iowa
- In office January 1917 – January 1921
- Governor: William L. Harding
- Preceded by: George Cosson
- Succeeded by: Ben Gibson

Personal details
- Born: November 22, 1871 near Corydon, Iowa
- Died: September 30, 1949 (aged 77) Mason City, Iowa
- Party: Republican
- Spouse: Ada Dean (m. 1901)
- Children: 2
- Education: Simpson College; University of Iowa

Military service
- Years of service: 1898
- Rank: Private
- Unit: 50th Infantry Unit; Company I
- Battles/wars: Spanish-American War

Horace Moore Havner (November 22, 1871 – September 30, 1949) was the Attorney General of Iowa from 1917 to 1921.

== Early life ==
He was born near Corydon, Iowa. He attended Simpson College. He then University of Iowa Law School and graduated in 1899. He began his law career with R. G. Popham at the law firm Popham and Havner in Marengo, Iowa, until he was elected Attorney General in 1916.

He served in the Spanish-American War as a private in Iowa's 50th Infantry Unit, under Company I.

== Politics ==
=== Attorney General ===
He was elected Attorney General of Iowa as a Republican in November 1916, taking office in January 1917 until January 1921.

== Personal life ==
In 1901, he married Ada Dean and had two daughters, Ada and Rachel.

Havner died on September 30, 1949 in a Mason City hotel.

Legal offices
Preceded by George Cosson	Attorney General of Iowa; 1917-1921	Succeeded by Ben Gibson
