= Alva L. Hager =

American politician (1850–1923)

Alva Hager
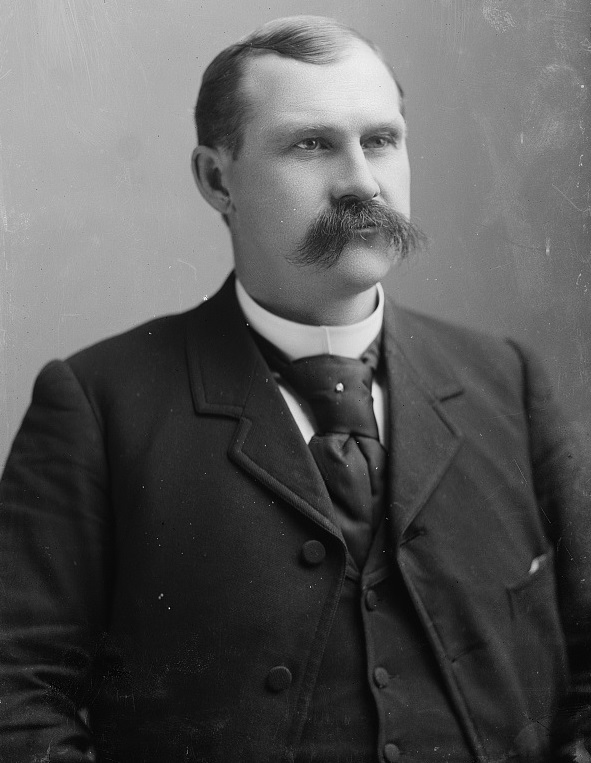

Member of the U.S. House of Representatives from Iowa's 9th district
- In office March 4, 1893 – March 3, 1899
- Preceded by: Thomas Bowman
- Succeeded by: Smith McPherson

Personal details
- Born: October 29, 1850 Jamestown, New York, U.S.
- Died: January 29, 1923 (aged 72) Des Moines, Iowa, U.S
- Party: Republican
- Education: University of Iowa

Alva Lysander Hager (October 29, 1850 – January 29, 1923) was a three-term Republican U.S. Representative from Iowa's 9th congressional district in the 1890s.

== Biography ==
Born near Jamestown, New York, Hager moved in 1859 to Iowa with his parents, who settled near Cottonville, in Jackson County. He moved to Jones County in 1863. He attended the public schools of Monticello and Anamosa. He graduated from the University of Iowa College of Law in 1875. He was admitted to the bar in 1875 and commenced practice in Greenfield, in southwestern Iowa. He served as member of the Iowa Senate in 1891. He served as chairman of the Iowa Republican State convention in 1892.

In 1892, the U.S. House seat for Iowa's 9th congressional district was open because incumbent Democrat Thomas Bowman did not seek a second term. Hager won the Republican nomination and the general election. After serving in the 53rd United States Congress, he was re-elected twice, serving in the Fifty-fourth, and Fifty-fifth Congresses.

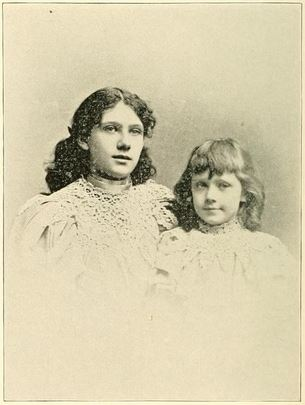
Daughters of Alva L. Hager

In August 1898, Hager was defeated by Smith McPherson in the race for the Republican nomination for Hager's seat. There were four serious candidates for the nomination. For several days, no candidate received the required number of votes, but McPherson prevailed on the 618th ballot, after Hager threw his support to him. In all, Hager served from March 4, 1893, to March 3, 1899.

After leaving Congress, Hager resumed the practice of law. He moved to Des Moines in 1901 and continued the practice of his profession. He engaged in banking from 1911 to 1918. He died in Des Moines on January 29, 1923. He was interred in Hrabak Funeral Home vault.

U.S. House of Representatives
Preceded by Thomas Bowman	Member of the U.S. House of Representatives from Iowa's 9th congressional district 1893–1899	Succeeded by Smith McPherson
