= Henrietta, Wisconsin =

- Town
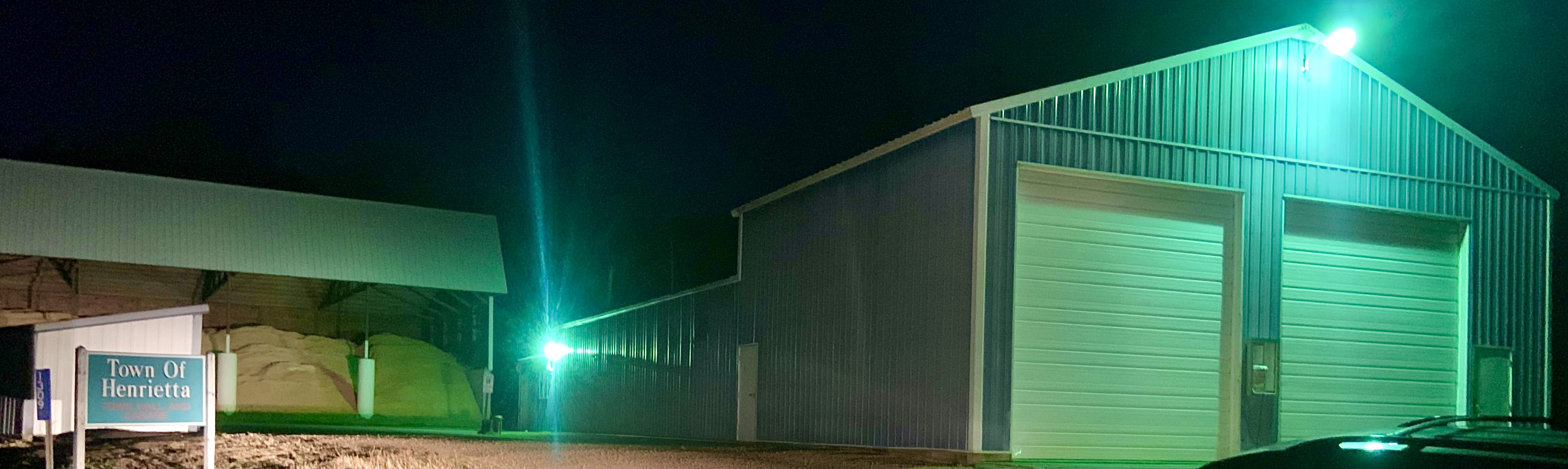
- Town hall

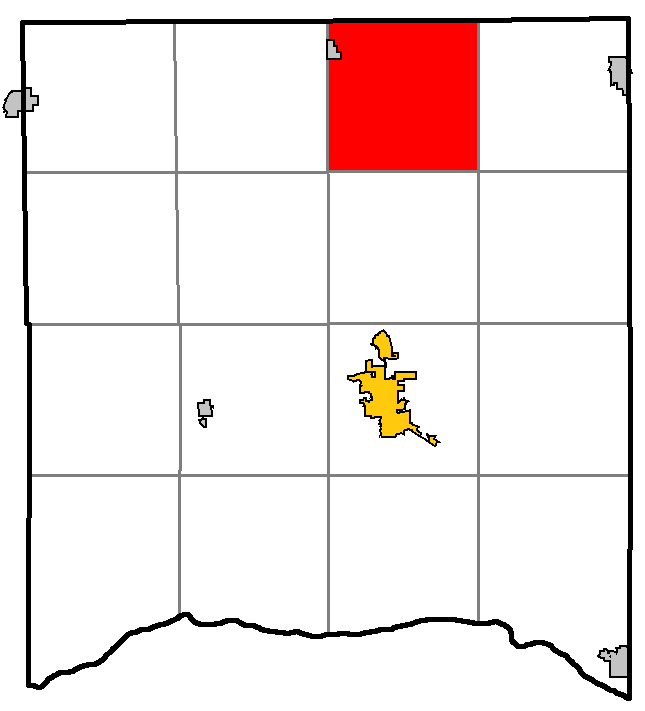
- Location of Henrietta, Wisconsin

- Location of Richland County, Wisconsin
- Coordinates: 43°30′35″N 90°22′34″W
- Country: United States
- State: Wisconsin
- County: Richland

Area
  - Total: 35.9 sq mi (93.1 km^{2})
  - Land: 35.9 sq mi (93.1 km^{2})
  - Water: 0 sq mi (0.0 km^{2})
- Elevation: 912 ft (278 m)

Population (2020)
  - Total: 435
  - Density: 12.1/sq mi (4.67/km^{2})
- Time zone: UTC-6 (Central (CST))
  - Summer (DST): UTC-5 (CDT)
- Area code: 608
- FIPS code: 55-33925
- GNIS feature ID: 1583378

Henrietta is a town in Richland County, Wisconsin, United States. The population was 435 at the 2020 census. The unincorporated communities of Hub City and Woodstock, the birthplace of former Iowa Attorney General Howard Webster Byers, are located in the town. The ghost town of Henrietta was also located in the town.

== Geography ==
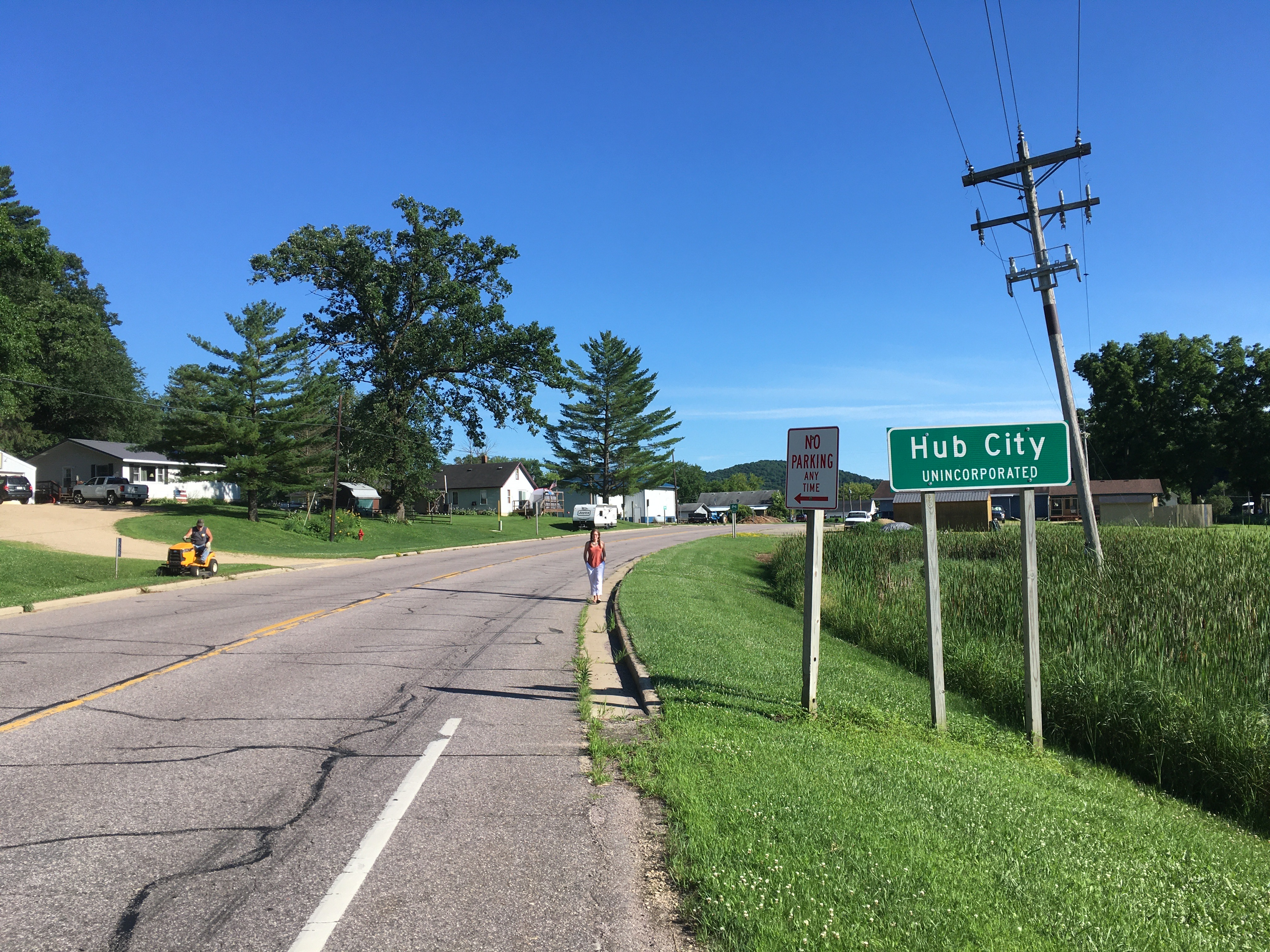
Sign for Hub City on Hwy 80 in Henrietta

According to the United States Census Bureau, the town has a total area of 35.9 square miles (93.1 km^{2}), all land.

== Demographics ==
At the 2000 census there were 479 people, 196 households, and 146 families in the town. The population density was 13.3 people per square mile (5.1/km^{2}). There were 276 housing units at an average density of 7.7 per square mile (3.0/km^{2}). The racial makeup of the town was 98.54% White, 0.21% African American, and 1.25% from two or more races. Hispanic or Latino of any race were 0.42%.

Of the 196 households 25.5% had children under the age of 18 living with them, 63.3% were married couples living together, 5.6% had a female householder with no husband present, and 25.5% were non-families. 21.4% of households were one person and 10.2% were one person aged 65 or older. The average household size was 2.44 and the average family size was 2.82.

The age distribution was 22.5% under the age of 18, 5.4% from 18 to 24, 23.6% from 25 to 44, 27.8% from 45 to 64, and 20.7% 65 or older. The median age was 44 years. For every 100 females, there were 107.4 males. For every 100 females age 18 and over, there were 113.2 males.

The median household income was $31,354 and the median family income was $33,542. Males had a median income of $25,250 versus $21,538 for females. The per capita income for the town was $17,598. About 6.5% of families and 8.9% of the population were below the poverty line, including 14.9% of those under age 18 and 5.3% of those age 65 or over.
