= Lawrence F. Scalise =

American politician (1933–2015)

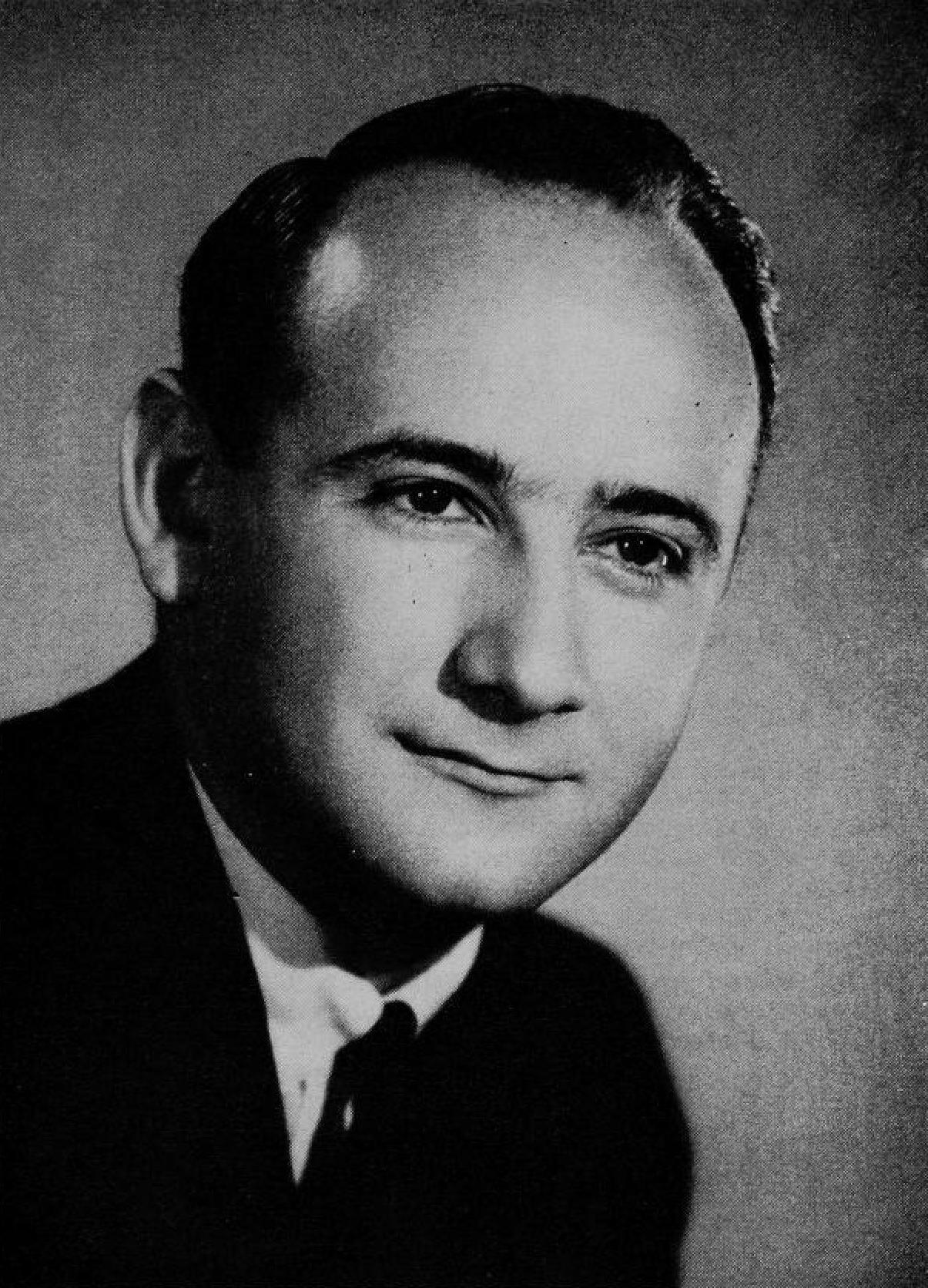

28th Attorney General of Iowa
- In office 1965–1967
- Governor: Harold Hughes
- Preceded by: Evan Hultman
- Succeeded by: Richard C. Turner

Personal details
- Born: April 25, 1933 Des Moines, Iowa, U.S.
- Died: June 12, 2015 (aged 82) Santa Barbara, California, U.S.
- Party: Democratic

Lawrence F. Scalise (April 25, 1933 – June 12, 2015) was an American politician and attorney in the state of Iowa. He served as Attorney General of Iowa from 1965 to 1966, as a Democrat. He attended the University of Iowa. He died in 2015.

Party political offices
| Preceded by Don A. Wilson | Democratic nominee for Attorney General of Iowa; 1962, 1964, 1966 | Succeeded by Don Johnston |
