= Fred D. Everett =

American politician (1876-1940)

Fred Everett

21st Attorney General of Iowa
- In office January 1939 – June 10, 1940
- Governor: George A. Wilson
- Preceded by: John H. Mitchell
- Succeeded by: John M. Rankin

Monroe County Attorney
- In office 1901–1905

Personal details
- Born: April 18, 1876 Bloomfield, Iowa
- Died: June 10, 1940 (aged 64)
- Spouse: Cora A. Sylvester (m. 1906)
- Children: 1

Military service
- Allegiance: United States
- Branch/service: United States Army
- Years of service: 1898-1900
- Unit: 51st regiment Iowa Infantry; Company D
- Battles/wars: Spanish–American War

Fred Demuth Everett (April 18, 1876 – June 10, 1940) was the Republican Attorney General of Iowa from 1939 to 1940.

== Life ==
Everett was born in Bloomfield, Iowa to John G. Everett and Bertha Everett. He attended Bloomfield High school and then Southern Iowa Normal School followed by attendance at the University of Iowa, where he studied Law, graduating in 1898.

He served in the 51st Iowa Infantry during the Spanish-American War during 1898 and then continued service in the Philippines Islands until 1900.

When he returned from war, he started a legal practice with D. M. Anderson, in Albia. He also served on the Albia School Board.

He served as a federal referee in bankruptcy cases in Ottumwa, in the Southern District of Iowa, from 1909 to 1914. He later formed a partnership with Charles E. Miller in Albia in 1918, working with him until his 1938 election to Attorney General.

== Political career ==
In 1900, he was elected as the Monroe County Attorney. He was re-elected in 1902, serving until 1905.

On June 6, 1938, Everett ran for Attorney General in the primary election. He won with 81,111 votes. He then won in the general election on November 8, 1938, with 416,895 votes against incumbent John H. Mitchell who had 352,131 votes. His term as Attorney General of Iowa began in January 1939. He served as Attorney General until he died. He ran in the 1940 primary election for Attorney General, winning with 142,911 votes against his opponent, Davies, 98,453 votes. He died 7 days after the primary election. His Assistant Attorney General, John M. Rankin was appointed by Governor George A. Wilson on June 17, 1940.

== Personal life ==
He married Cora A. Sylvester in 1906 and had a daughter, Jane. He attended Christian churches throughout his life.

Everett died on June 10, 1940. Cora died in 1976.
