= Fremont Township, Johnson County, Iowa =

Township in Johnson County, Iowa, U.S.

Coordinates: 41.4700°N 91.4325°W

Fremont Township is a township in Johnson County, Iowa, United States.

== History ==
Fremont Township was organized in 1857. It is named for John C. Frémont, candidate in the 1856 United States presidential election.
