= Evan Hultman =

United States Army general (1925–2025)

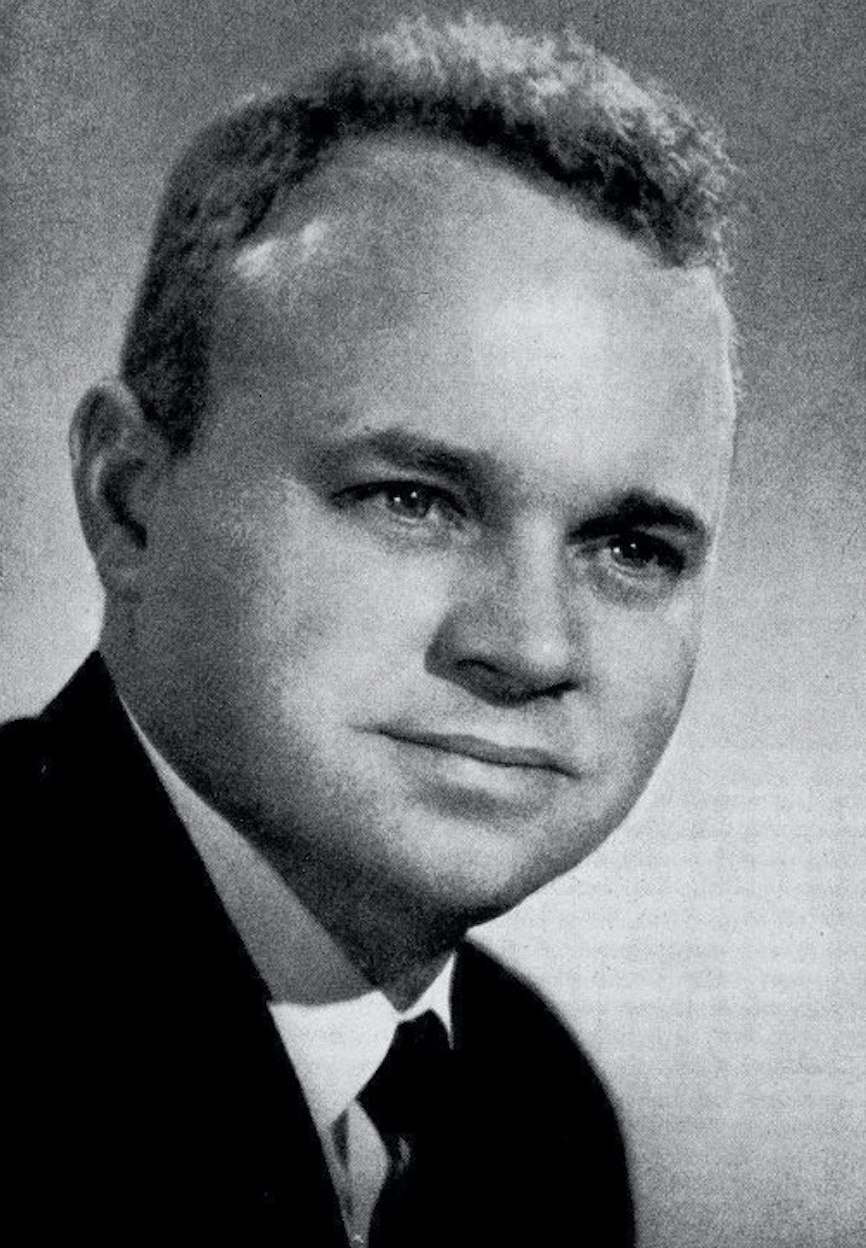
- Hultman in 1961

27th Attorney General of Iowa
- In office 1961–1965
- Governor: Harold Hughes
- Preceded by: Norman A. Erbe
- Succeeded by: Lawrence F. Scalise

Personal details
- Born: July 15, 1925 Albia, Iowa, U.S.
- Died: February 16, 2025 (aged 99)
- Party: Republican
- Occupation: Lawyer, politician

Evan "Curly" Hultman (July 15, 1925 – February 16, 2025) was an American politician and attorney in the state of Iowa. He served as Attorney General of Iowa from 1961 to 1965, as a Republican. He was major general in the United States Army Reserve and served in the Army during World War II. He attended the University of Iowa, earning a B.A. in 1949, and J.D. in 1952. Hultman died on February 16, 2025, at the age of 99.

Party political offices
Preceded by Norman A. Erbe	Republican nominee for Attorney General of Iowa; 1960, 1962	Succeeded by Wilbur N. Bump
Preceded by Norman A. Erbe	Republican nominee Governor of Iowa; 1964	Succeeded by William G. Murray
Legal offices
Preceded by Norman A. Erbe	Attorney General of Iowa; 1961–1965	Succeeded by Lawrence F. Scalise
