= John F. McJunkin =

American politician and lawyer

Attorney General of Iowa
- In office 1877–1881
- Preceded by: Marsena E. Cutts
- Succeeded by: Smith McPherson

John Ferguson McJunkin (September 23, 1830 – January 1, 1883) was an American politician and lawyer.

Born in Washington County, Pennsylvania, McJunkin taught school and studied law. In 1858, he was admitted to the Pennsylvania bar. In 1859, McJunkin moved to Washington, Iowa and continued to practice law. From 1864 to 1868, McJunkin served in the Iowa State Senate and was a Republican. Then from 1877 to 1881, McJunkin served as the Iowa Attorney General. McJunkin died from heart problems at his home in Washington, Iowa.

== Notes ==
Legal offices
Preceded by Marsena E. Cutts	Attorney General of Iowa; 1877–1881	Succeeded by Smith McPherson
