= Smith McPherson =

American politician and judge (1848–1915)

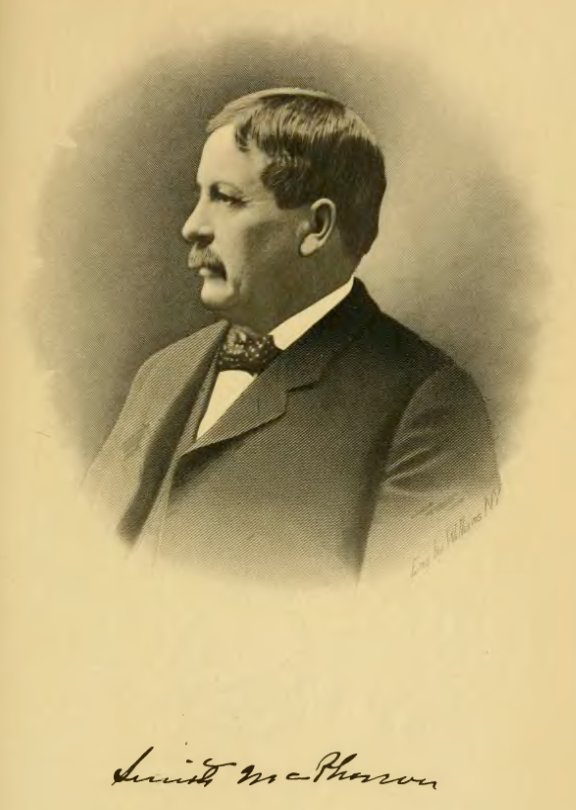

Judge of the United States District Court for the Southern District of Iowa
- In office May 7, 1900 – January 17, 1915
- Appointed by: William McKinley
- Preceded by: John Simson Woolson
- Succeeded by: Martin Joseph Wade

Member of the U.S. House of Representatives from Iowa's 9th district
- In office March 4, 1899 – June 6, 1900
- Preceded by: Alva L. Hager
- Succeeded by: Walter I. Smith

Attorney General of Iowa
- In office 1881–1885
- Preceded by: John F. McJunkin
- Succeeded by: Andrew J. Baker

Personal details
- Born: Smith McPherson; February 14, 1848 Mooresville, Indiana, U.S.
- Died: January 17, 1915 (aged 66) Red Oak, Iowa, U.S.
- Resting place: Evergreen Cemetery; Red Oak, Iowa
- Party: Republican
- Education: University of Iowa College of Law (LL.B.)

Smith McPherson (February 14, 1848 – January 17, 1915) was a United States representative from Iowa and a United States district judge of the United States District Court for the Southern District of Iowa.

== Education and career ==
Born on February 14, 1848, near Mooresville, Morgan County, Indiana, McPherson attended the common schools and Mooresville Academy. He received a Bachelor of Laws in 1870 from the University of Iowa College of Law. He was admitted to the bar and entered private practice in Red Oak, Iowa from 1870 to 1874. He was district attorney for the Third Judicial District of Iowa from 1874 to 1880. He was Attorney General of Iowa from 1881 to 1885. He resumed private practice in Red Oak from 1885 to 1899.

== Congressional service ==
In August 1898, McPherson defeated incumbent congressman Alva L. Hager and two others in the race for the Republican nomination in Iowa's 9th congressional district. For several days, no candidate received the required number of votes, but McPherson prevailed on the 618th ballot, after Hager threw his support to him. McPherson was then elected to the United States House of Representatives of the 56th United States Congress and served from March 4, 1899, until his resignation on June 6, 1900, to accept a federal judicial post.

== Federal judicial service ==
McPherson was nominated by President William McKinley on April 3, 1900, to a seat on the United States District Court for the Southern District of Iowa vacated by Judge John Simson Woolson. He was confirmed by the United States Senate on May 7, 1900, and received his commission the same day. His service terminated on January 17, 1915, due to his death in Red Oak. He was interred in Evergreen Cemetery in Red Oak.

=== Notable case ===
In McPherson's final year on the bench, he upheld the constitutionality of Iowa's workers' compensation statute against an attack by an employer alleging that it violated due process.

== Sources ==
- United States Congress. "Smith McPherson (id: M000594)". Biographical Directory of the United States Congress.

U.S. House of Representatives
Preceded by Alva L. Hager	Member of the U.S. House of Representatives from Iowa's 9th congressional district 1899–1900	Succeeded by Walter I. Smith
Legal offices
Preceded by John F. McJunkin	Attorney General of Iowa; 1881–1885	Succeeded by Andrew J. Baker
Preceded by John Simson Woolson	Judge of the United States District Court for the Southern District of Iowa; 1900–1915	Succeeded by Martin Joseph Wade
