= Ben Gibson (politician) =

American politician and lawyer

17th Attorney General of Iowa
- In office 1921–1927
- Governor: Nathan E. Kendall; John Hammill
- Preceded by: Horace M. Havner
- Succeeded by: John Fletcher

Member of the Iowa Senate
- In office January 8, 1917 – 1917

Personal details
- Born: November 13, 1882 Adams County, Iowa
- Died: July 8, 1949 (aged 66) Rochester, Minnesota
- Party: Republican
- Spouse: Anna Rolston (m. 1905)
- Children: 2
- Education: University of Nebraska

Military service
- Years of service: 1917-1919
- Rank: Captain
- Unit: 168th Infantry Regiment; 72nd Field Artillery Brigade
- Battles/wars: World War I

Benjamin J. Gibson (November 13, 1882 – July 8, 1949) was the Attorney General of Iowa from 1921 to 1927.

== Early life ==
Gibson was born in Adams County, Iowa one of six children to William Gibson and Virginia (Campbell) Gibson. His maternal great-grandfather, James Campbell, was a veteran of the War of 1812. His maternal grandfather was a veteran of the American Civil War.

Gibson went to the public schools in Adams County. He graduated from the University of Nebraska in 1906 and was admitted to the Iowa bar. Gibson practiced law in Corning, Iowa from 1906 until 1920.

== Politics and WWI ==
=== Iowa State Senate ===
He served in the Iowa State Senate in 1917 and was a Republican.

=== World War I ===
Gibson enlisted in the United States Army and was commissioned captain during World War I. He trained at Camp Meade and served until March 6, 1919.

=== Attorney General ===
From 1921 to 1927, Gibson served as Iowa Attorney General. In August 1921, he created a Bureau of Investigation to make it easier to connect police across the state and to get access to the federal records of the Department of Justice. He moved to Des Moines, Iowa, and continued to practice law.

== Personal life ==
He married Anna Rolston on September 5, 1905. Her father was a veteran of the Civil War, fighting for the Union, specifically fighting with the Army of the Potomac. They had 3 sons, Wayne, Wendell and Benjamin Jr. They attended the Central Presbyterian Church.

Gibson died in Rochester, Minnesota, after having stomach surgery.

Legal offices
Preceded by H. M. Havner	Attorney General of Iowa; 1921–1927	Succeeded by John Fletcher
