= Howard Webster Byers =

American politician and lawyer

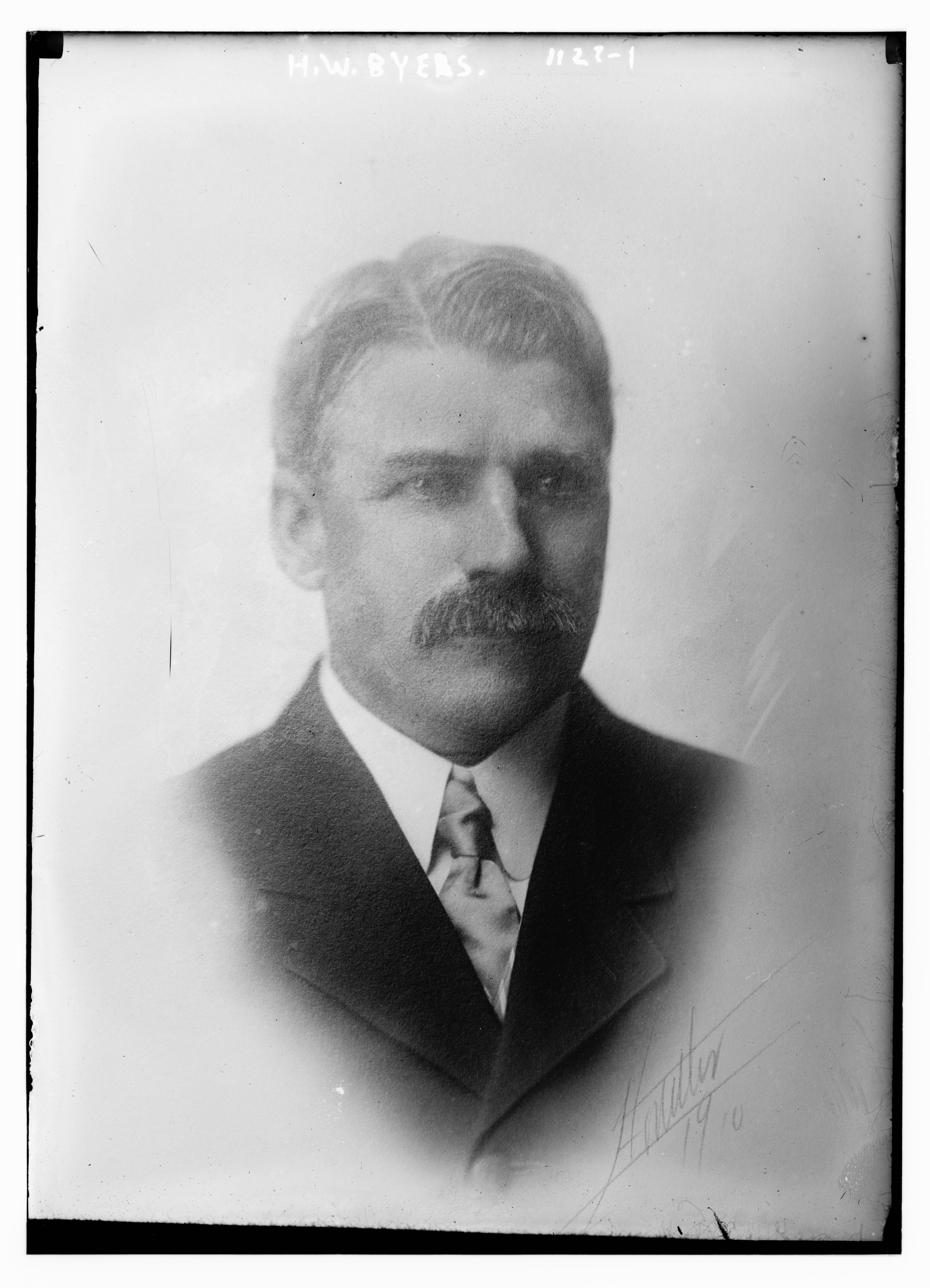

14th Attorney General of Iowa
- In office January 1907 – January 1911
- Governor: Beryl F. Carroll
- Preceded by: Charles W. Mullan
- Succeeded by: George Cosson

25th Speaker of the Iowa House of Representatives
- In office January 13, 1896 – May 11, 1897

Member of the Iowa House of Representatives
- In office January 8, 1894 – January 9, 1898
- In office January 8, 1900 – January 12, 1902

Personal details
- Born: December 25, 1856 Woodstock, Wisconsin
- Died: March 24, 1928 (aged 71) Des Moines, Iowa
- Party: Republican
- Spouse: Mary J. Winegar (m. 1882)
- Children: 6

Howard Webster Byers (December 25, 1856 – March 24, 1928) was an American politician and lawyer who served as the 14th Iowa Attorney General from 1907 to 1911.

== Early life ==
Byers was born in a log cabin in Woodstock, Wisconsin on Christmas Day, 1856. His parents were Dr. Andrew Clinton Byers and Mary Caldwell (née Holwell) Byers, who hailed from Pennsylvania. His family moved to Hancock County, Iowa in 1873, when Byers was 17. They then moved to Shelby and Earling, Iowa.

From 1871 to 1876, he was a farm laborer. From 1876 to 1881, he was a teacher. He then became a store clerk from 1881 to 1891. During this time he studied law with the practice of Macy and Gammon. He was admitted to the Iowa bar in 1888. He then was a law clerk for 2 years, from 1891 to 1893.

== Politics ==
He was a Republican. He was made a permanent chairman of the Iowa Republican Convention in 1908.

He first ran for the Iowa House in 1890 and lost.

In 1893, Byers he won election to the Iowa House, serving from 1894 to 1898. He served as the Speaker of the Iowa House from 1896 to 1898.

In 1896 and 1898 he ran for the US House in Iowa's 9th congressional district, losing each time.

He returned to the Iowa House in 1900 until 1902.

He won the 1906 election to be Iowa Attorney General and was re-elected in 1908.

He ran again for the US House for Iowa's 9th district in 1910. On June 7, 1910, he ran in the Republican primary against former Iowa Judge and then-incumbent congressman Walter I. Smith. Byers' lost the race with 8,138 votes against Smith's 9,743 votes. Smith eventually won in the general election.

In 1911, he became the corporation counsel for the city of Des Moines. He remained there until 1921.

== Personal life ==
He married Mary J. Winegar in May 1882. They had 6 children.

On November 26, 1894, the Byers home was burglarized. The thieves entered through a window and got away with a pair of pants and $17 cash.

Byers died on March 28, 1928 at Mercy Hospital in Des Moines. Mary died on September 6, 1946, aged 81.

Legal offices
Preceded by John F. Riggs	Attorney General of Iowa; 1909–1911	Succeeded by George Cosson
