= Charles W. Mullan =

American politician (1845–1919)

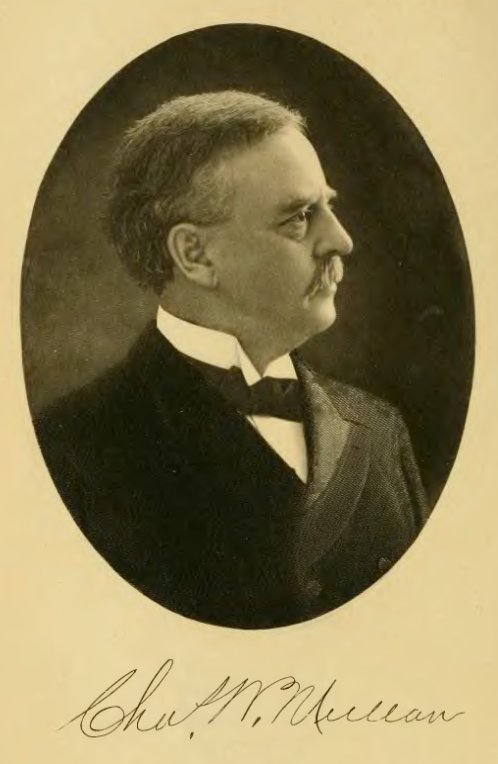
- Portrait in History of Iowa From the Earliest Times to the Beginning of the Twentieth Century

13th Attorney General of Iowa
- In office 1901–1907
- Preceded by: Milton Remley
- Succeeded by: Howard Webster Byers

Charles W. Mullin (December 31, 1845 – March 8, 1919) was an American judge, lawyer and politician.

Born in Wayne County, Illinois, Mullan moved with his parents to Black Hawk County, Iowa. He went to the public school in Black Hawk County. During the American Civil War, Mullan served in the 47th Iowa Volunteer Infantry Regiment. He then studied law, went to Upper Iowa University, and was admitted to the Iowa bar in 1870. Mullan practiced law in Waterloo, Iowa. He served as solicitor for the city of Waterloo and as county attorney for Black Hawk County. Mullan also served on the Waterloo School Board. He was a Republican. From 1898 to 1902, Mullan served in the Iowa State Senate. From 1901 to 1907, Mullan served as Iowa Attorney General. Then from 1913 until his death in 1919, Mullan served as an Iowa District Court judge. Mullan died at St. Mary's Hospital in Rochester, Minnesota after undergoing surgery.

== Notes ==
Legal offices
Preceded by Milton Remley	Attorney General of Iowa; 1901–1907	Succeeded by John F. Riggs
