= George Cosson =

American politician and lawyer

George W. Cosson

15th Attorney General of Iowa
- In office January 1911 – January 1917
- Governor: Beryl F. Carroll; George W. Clarke
- Preceded by: Howard Webster Byers
- Succeeded by: Horace M. Havner

Member of the Iowa Senate
- In office January 11, 1909 – January 8, 1911
- Preceded by: Frank M. Hopkins
- Succeeded by: Anthony M. McColl

Assistant Attorney General of Iowa
- In office May 4, 1907 – May 12, 1908

Audubon County Attorney
- In office January 2, 1905 – January 7, 1907
- Preceded by: Fred H. Blume
- Succeeded by: James M. Graham

Personal details
- Born: January 21, 1876 Laclede County, Missouri
- Died: June 15, 1963 (aged 87) Des Moines, Iowa
- Spouse: Jane F. Riggs (m. 1904; died 1943)
- Education: University of Iowa College of Law; Valparaiso University

George W. Cosson (January 21, 1876 – June 15, 1963) was the Attorney General of Iowa from 1911 until 1917.

== Early life ==
Cosson was born in Laclede County, Missouri. He attended school in Manning, Iowa, and subsequently enrolled at Valparaiso University and the University of Iowa. He began working for Milwaukee Road as a station agent and operator from 1892 until 1896. He graduated from the University of Iowa College of Law in June 1898 and moved to Audubon to begin practicing law.

== Political career ==
=== County Attorney ===
In November 1904, he ran against Democrat George F. Knapp for Audubon County attorney. Cosson won with 1,778 votes compared to Knapp's 1,005 votes. He was sworn in as County Attorney in January 1905.

In November 1906, he ran against Democrat James M. Graham in the general election. Graham won with 1,259 votes against Cosson's 1,233 votes, a difference of only 26 votes.

=== Assistant Attorney General ===
In May 1907, he was appointed Assistant Attorney General of Iowa. He served in that position until May 1908, when he resigned to resume practicing law in Audubon.

=== Iowa State Senate ===
On June 2, 1908, Cosson won the Republican primary with 2,871 votes against Democrat W. C. Elliott's 2,424 votes. On November 3, 1908, he won in the general election with 6,991 votes against Democrat J. S. McLuen's 4,123 votes.

He represented District 17 from 1909 to 1911. He served on the Committees for School, Judiciary, Public Health, Agriculture, Suppression of Intemperance, Highways, Educational Institutions and Claims. He was the chairman of the Suppression of Intemperance Committee.

=== Attorney General of Iowa ===
He served as Attorney General of Iowa in 1911 to 1917.

In November 1910, Cosson ran against Democrat C. E. Walters. Cosson won with 204,918 votes against Walters 165,659 votes.

In November 1912, Cosson ran against Democrat C. E. Walters, in rematch of 1910. Cosson again won with 196,369 votes against Walters 180,465 votes.

=== Failed Gubernatorial and Senate Races ===
He sought the Republican nomination for Governor in 1916, losing to William L. Harding, in the primary by 53,000 votes.

He later ran in the 1932 US Senate Republican primary. He ran against Henry Ames Field, incumbent Senator Smith W. Brookhart, former Iowa State Auditor Glenn C. Haynes, Louis Cook and L. E. Eickelberg. Cosson lost with 29,687 votes, compared to Field's 197,263 votes, Brookhart's 145,902 votes, Haynes's 43,050 votes. Cosson won more votes than Cook, who won 12,103 votes, and Eickelberg, who won 8,513 votes. Field won the primary, but lost to Democrat Richard Louis Murphy in the general election.

=== World War II ===
During World War II, Cosson served as Chairman of the Iowa Russian War Relief Committee. He went on a trip to Russia as well.

== Personal life ==
On December 28, 1904, he married Jane "Jennie" F. Riggs in Indianola. Jennie was a principal at the Audubon schools for 2 years. They had four children. Jennie died on February 3, 1943 in San Francisco, while visiting their son, Clarence. She died of pneumonia.

In 1961, Cosson moved to his daughter's home in Des Moines, and retired from the practice of law in August 1962. He died in Des Moines on June 15, 1963.
