= Iowa Attorney General =

Attorney general of the U.S. state of Iowa

Attorney General of Iowa
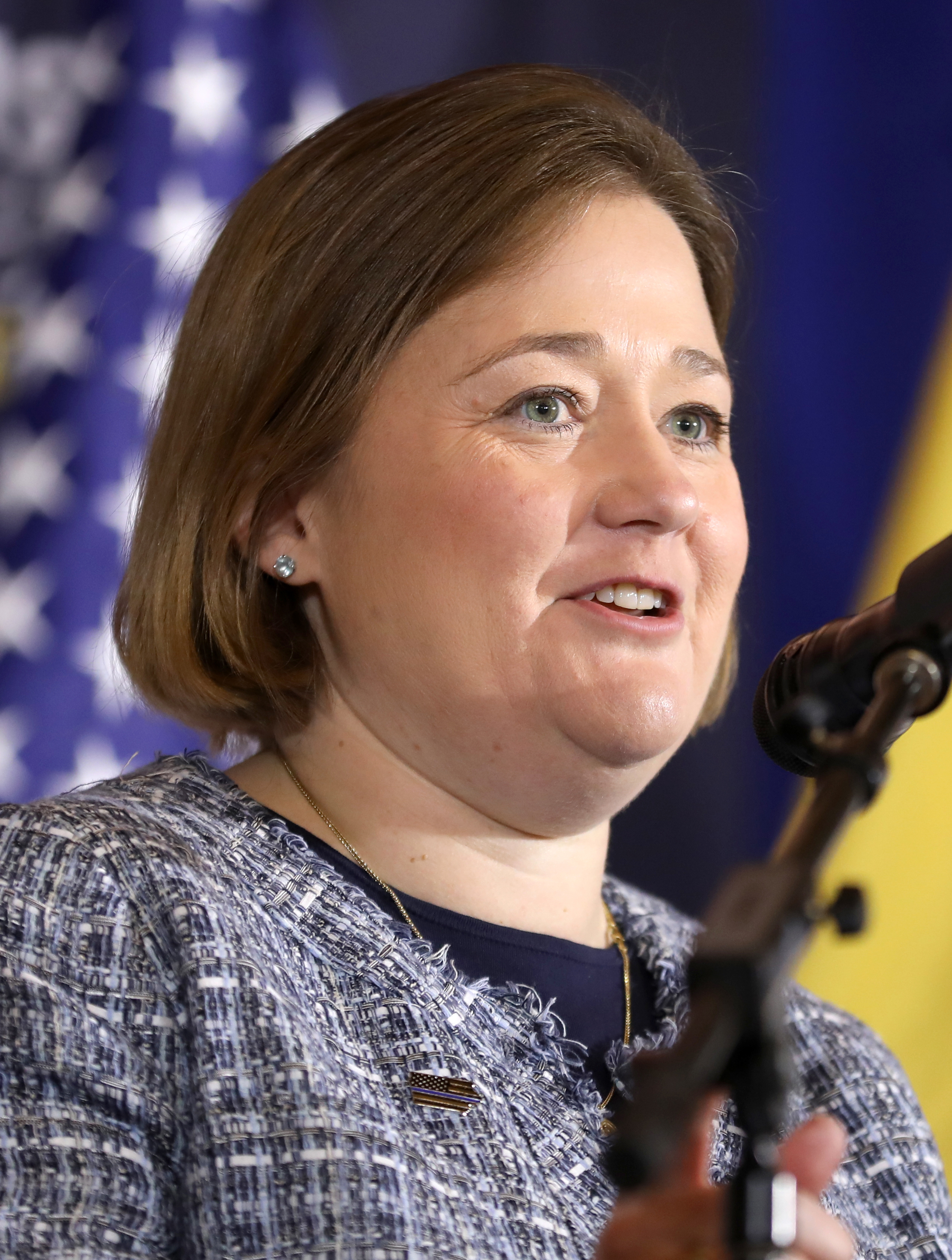
- Incumbent; Brenna Bird since January 3, 2023
- Type: Chief legal officer
- Seat: Lucas State Office Building, Des Moines
- Formation: February 9, 1853
- First holder: David C. Cloud
- Website: www.iowaattorneygeneral.gov

The attorney general of Iowa is the chief legal officer of the state of Iowa, United States.

The office was created February 9, 1853. The Office of the Attorney General is housed in the Lucas State Office Building in Des Moines; the attorney general also has a room in the Iowa State Capitol to prepare legislation.

As stated in Iowa law, the powers and duties of the office include: Representing the departments and agencies of state government; taking action for citizens in consumer protection and other areas; enforcing the state's environmental protection laws; playing a central role in the criminal justice system; and providing assistance and advocacy for the victims of crime. The attorney general also issues legal opinions on questions of law submitted by elected or appointed state officials and defends all tort claim actions against the state. Iowa is unique in that its attorney general belongs to the judicial branch of government; in 48 of the other 50 states, the attorney general is a member of the executive branch.

Republican Brenna Bird has been the attorney general since 2023.

== List of attorneys general of Iowa ==
Parties

Democratic (7) Republican (26)

No.	Name	Took office	Left office	Party
1	David C. Cloud	1853	1856	Democratic
2	Samuel A. Rice	1856	1861	Republican
3	Charles C. Nourse	1861	1865	Republican
4	Isaac L. Allen	1865	1866	Republican
5	Frederick E. Bissell	1866	1867	Republican
6	Henry O'Connor	1867	1872	Republican
7	Marsena E. Cutts	1872	1877	Republican
8	John F. McJunkin	1877	1881	Republican
9	Smith McPherson	1881	1885	Republican
10	Andrew J. Baker	1885	1889	Republican
11	John Young Stone	1889	1895	Republican
12	Milton Remley	1895	1901	Republican
13	Charles W. Mullan	1901	1907	Republican
14	Howard Webster Byers	1907	1911	Republican
15	George Cosson	1911	1917	Republican
16	Horace M. Havner	1917	1921	Republican
17	Ben Gibson	1921	1927	Republican
18	John Fletcher	1927	1933	Republican
19	Edward L. O'Connor	1933	1937	Democratic
20	John H. Mitchell	1937	1938	Democratic
21	Fred D. Everett	1939	1940	Republican
22	John M. Rankin	1941	1947	Republican
23	Robert L. Larson	1947	1953	Republican
24	Leo Hoegh	1953	1955	Republican
25	Dayton Countryman	1955	1957	Republican
26	Norman A. Erbe	1957	1961	Republican
27	Evan Hultman	1961	1965	Republican
28	Lawrence F. Scalise	1965	1967	Democratic
29	Richard C. Turner	1967	1979	Republican
30	Tom Miller	1979	1991	Democratic
31	Bonnie Campbell	1991	1995	Democratic
32	Tom Miller	1995	2023	Democratic
33	Brenna Bird	2023	Incumbent	Republican
34	Nate Willems	Takes Office: 2027	Attorney General-elect	Democratic
