= John M. Rankin =

American politician (1873–1947)

John Mercer Rankin

22nd Attorney General of Iowa
- In office 1940–1947
- Governor: George A. Wilson; Bourke B. Hickenlooper; Robert D. Blue
- Preceded by: Fred D. Everett
- Succeeded by: Robert L. Larson

Iowa District Court Judge for Lee County
- In office 1925–1938

Member of the Iowa House of Representatives from the 39th district
- In office 1921–1927

Personal details
- Born: June 9, 1873 Warren County, Mississippi, U.S.
- Died: June 20, 1947 (aged 74) Des Moines, Iowa, U.S.
- Education: Chicago-Kent College of Law

Military service
- Allegiance: United States
- Branch/service: United States Army
- Unit: 6th Illinois Volunteer Infantry
- Battles/wars: Spanish–American War

John Mercer Rankin (June 9, 1873 – June 20, 1947) was an American judge, lawyer, and politician.

== Life ==
Born in Fulton County, Illinois, Rankin served in the 6th Illinois Volunteer Infantry during the Spanish–American War. He went to Western Normal School at Bushnell, Illinois. Rankin went Chicago–Kent College of Law and was admitted to the Illinois bar. He practiced law in Chicago, Illinois until 1917 and then moved to Keokuk, Lee County, Iowa in 1917. He continued to practice law in Keokuk.

== Political and Judicial Career ==
From 1921 to 1927, Rankin served in the Iowa House of Representatives and was a Republican. From 1925 to 1938, Rankin served as Iowa District Court judge for Lee County. Rankin served as Iowa Attorney General from 1940 until his death in 1947. Rankin died of lung cancer at a veterans hospital in Des Moines, Iowa.
