= 1901 Iowa Senate election =

- November 5, 1901

21 out of 50 seats in the Iowa State Senate 26 seats needed for a majority
	Majority party	Minority party
Party	Republican	Democratic
Last election	35	15
Seats after	39	11
Seat change	▲4	▼4

In the 1901 Iowa State Senate elections Iowa voters elected state senators in 21 of the state senate's 50 districts. State senators traditionally serve four-year terms in the Iowa State Senate. However, under the Biennial Elections law enacted in 1904 by the Iowa General Assembly, the senators elected in 1901 served an additional fifth year (until the 1906 elections) to accommodate the transition to holding elections on even-numbered years. (Note: The twenty-ninth Iowa General Assembly enacted the Joint Resolution No. 5: Biennial Elections law in 1904 moving general elections to even-numbered years. Prior to this amendment to the Iowa constitution, elections to the state senate were held in odd-numbered years. The law stipulates: "Add as section 16, to article 12 of the constitution (of the state of Iowa), the following: The first general election after the adoption of this amendment shall be held on the Tuesday after the first Monday in November in the year one thousand nine hundred and six, and general elections shall be held biennially thereafter...members of the general assembly whose successors would otherwise be chosen at the general election in the year one thousand nine hundred and five, are hereby extended one year and until their successors are elected and qualified. The terms of office of senators whose successors would otherwise be chosen in the year one thousand nine hundred and seven are hereby extended one year and until their successors are elected and qualified...")

A statewide map of the 50 state Senate districts in the 1901 elections is provided by the Iowa General Assembly.

The 1901 elections occurred before primary elections were established in Iowa by the Primary Election Law in 1907. The general election took place on November 5, 1901.

Following the previous election, Republicans had control of the Iowa Senate with 35 seats to Democrats' 15 seats.

To claim control of the chamber from Republicans, the Democrats needed to net 11 Senate seats.

Republicans maintained control of the Iowa State Senate following the 1901 general election with the balance of power shifting to Republicans holding 39 seats and Democrats having 11 seats (a net gain of 4 seats for Republicans). However, during the twenty-ninth session of the Iowa General Assembly, the senators decided in March 1902 to decertify Democrat Joseph Martin Emmert of district eighteen and replace Emmert with Republican James E. Bruce, thus flipping the seat from Democratic to Republican control. (Note: Democrat J. M. Emmert was originally declared the winner of the 1901 general election in the eighteenth senatorial district. Emmert received certificate of election and served until March 1902. However, Republican James E. Bruce contested the election of Mr. Emmert and the Senate, on March 14, 1902, decided the contest in favor of Mr. Bruce. The senators thereby removed Mr. Emmert and replaced him with Mr. Bruce, flipping the seat from Democratic to Republican control.) Therefore, Republicans held an advantage of 40 seats to Democrats' 10 seats in 1902 following the installation of Mr. Bruce.

== Summary of Results ==
- Note: The 29 holdover Senators not up for re-election are not listed on this table.

State Senate District	Incumbent	Party	Elected Senator	Party
1st	David Arthur Young	Dem	David Arthur Young	Dem
7th	William Eaton	Rep	Lester W. Lewis	Rep
9th	William Corse McArthur	Rep	Frederick Norton Smith	Dem
10th	Amos Norris Alberson	Dem	John Alex Young	Rep
12th	William Robinson Lewis	Rep	John Tinley Brooks	Rep
13th	William Anderson McIntire	Dem	Samuel Houston Harper	Rep
18th (Note: Originally, incumbent Democrat Joseph Martin Emmert was declared the victor of the general election in the 18th senatorial district. Emmert would continue to serve in the Iowa Senate until March 13, 1902. However, Republican James E. Bruce contested the election results. The state senators decided in Bruce's favor, removed Emmert, and installed Bruce in the seat, thereby flipping the seat from Democratic to Republican control.)	Joseph Martin Emmert	Dem	Joseph Martin Emmert	Dem
18th	Joseph Martin Emmert	Dem	James E. Bruce	Rep
20th	George Marion Titus	Rep	Fred M. Molsberry	Rep
21st	William C. Hayward	Rep	William C. Hayward	Rep
22nd	John Lowry Wilson	Dem	John Lowry Wilson	Dem
29th	Joseph R. Gorrell	Dem	Frederick Louis Maytag	Rep
30th	Thomas Abbott Cheshire	Rep	Cassius Clay Dowell	Rep
34th	Lemuel Rose Bolter	Dem	Ernest Lincoln Hogue	Rep
35th	Thomas Francis Nolan	Dem	Phineas W. Crawford	Rep
37th	Joseph Wallace	Rep	Fred Carlton Hartshorn	Rep
38th	Charles W. Mullan	Rep	Orlando Billings Courtright	Rep
42nd	Dennis Aloysius Lyons	Dem	Dennis Aloysius Lyons	Dem
44th	William Burton Perrin	Rep	Edmund Cole Spaulding	Rep
45th	Emlen G. Penrose	Rep	William Perry Whipple	Rep
48th	Warren Garst	Rep	Warren Garst	Rep
50th	Parley Finch	Rep	Edward King Winne	Rep

== Detailed Results ==
- NOTE: The 29 districts that did not hold elections in 1901 are not listed here.

=== District 1 ===
Iowa Senate, District 1 General Election, 1901
Party	Candidate	Votes	%
Democratic	David A. Young (incumbent)	3,514	50.54%
Republican	Joseph Fry	3,355	48.25%
Prohibition	E. E. Lowe	84	1.21%
Total votes		6,953	100.00%
Democratic hold			

=== District 7 ===
Iowa Senate, District 7 General Election, 1901
Party	Candidate	Votes	%
Republican	Lester W. Lewis	4,123	56.40%
Democratic	B. I Cavender	2,888	39.51%
Prohibition	C. H. Barnhill	299	4.09%
Total votes		7,310	100.00%
Republican hold			

=== District 9 ===
Iowa Senate, District 9 General Election, 1901
Party	Candidate	Votes	%
Democratic	Fred N. Smith	3,185	50.38%
Republican	Wilson B. Williams	2,790	44.13%
Socialist	J. O. Beebe	240	3.80%
Prohibition	Frank Stocking	107	1.69%
Total votes		6,322	100.00%
Democratic gain from Republican			

=== District 10 ===
Iowa Senate, District 10 General Election, 1901
Party	Candidate	Votes	%
Republican	John Alex Young	4,556	56.87%
Democratic	Amos Norris Alberson (incumbent)	3,061	38.21%
Prohibition	James H. Scull	394	4.92%
Total votes		8,011	100.00%
Republican gain from Democratic			

=== District 12 ===
Iowa Senate, District 12 General Election, 1901
Party	Candidate	Votes	%
Republican	J. T. Brooks	4,908	57.02%
Democratic	Thomas Geneva	3,699	42.98%
Total votes		8,607	100.00%
Republican hold			

=== District 13 ===
Iowa Senate, District 13 General Election, 1901
Party	Candidate	Votes	%
Republican	S. H. Harper	3,703	49.35%
Democratic	W. A. McIntire (incumbent)	3,628	48.35%
Socialist	James M. Winn	172	2.29%
Total votes		7,503	100.00%
Republican gain from Democratic			

=== District 18 ===
Iowa Senate, District 18 General Election, 1901
Party	Candidate	Votes	%
Democratic	J. M. Emmert (incumbent)	4,041	50.01%
Republican	James E. Bruce	4,040	49.99%
Total votes		8,081	100.00%
Democratic hold			

- J. M. Emmert received certificate of election. James E. Bruce contested the election of Mr. Emmert and the Senate, on March 14, 1902, decided the contest in favor of Mr. Bruce. Therefore, Mr. Emmert was unseated and Mr. Bruce was installed.

=== District 20 ===
Iowa Senate, District 20 General Election, 1901
Party	Candidate	Votes	%
Republican	F. M. Molsberry	4,596	57.75%
Democratic	E. M. Warner	3,189	40.07%
Prohibition	J. S. Tussey	174	2.19%
Total votes		7,959	100.00%
Republican hold			

=== District 21 ===
Iowa Senate, District 21 General Election, 1901
Party	Candidate	Votes	%
Republican	W. C. Hayward (incumbent)	4,533	50.38%
Democratic	William Theophilus	4,048	44.99%
Socialist	Hugo Struck	416	4.62%
Total votes		8,997	100.00%
Republican hold			

=== District 22 ===
Iowa Senate, District 22 General Election, 1901
Party	Candidate	Votes	%
Democratic	John L. Wilson (incumbent)	4,201	52.65%
Republican	George D. McDaid	3,465	43.43%
Socialist	Karl Rick	313	3.92%
Total votes		7,979	100.00%
Democratic hold			

=== District 29 ===
Iowa Senate, District 29 General Election, 1901
Party	Candidate	Votes	%
Republican	Fred L. Maytag	3,529	58.98%
Democratic	Adam M. Harrah	2,454	41.02%
Total votes		5,983	100.00%
Republican gain from Democratic			

=== District 30 ===
Iowa Senate, District 30 General Election, 1901
Party	Candidate	Votes	%
Republican	C. C. Dowell	8,752	69.39%
Democratic	R. B. Parrott	3,020	23.94%
Prohibition	C. H. Gordon	646	5.12%
Socialist	A. D. Pugh	195	1.55%
Total votes		12,613	100.00%
Republican hold			

=== District 34 ===
Iowa Senate, District 34 General Election, 1901
Party	Candidate	Votes	%
Republican	Ernest L. Hogue	6,719	53.84%
Democratic	John T. Carey	5,761	46.16%
Total votes		12,480	100.00%
Republican gain from Democratic			

=== District 35 ===
Iowa Senate, District 35 General Election, 1901
Party	Candidate	Votes	%
Republican	P. W. Crawford	4,677	48.56%
Democratic	Thomas F. Nolan (incumbent)	4,649	48.27%
Socialist	W. D. Wilbur	305	3.17%
Total votes		9,631	100.00%
Republican gain from Democratic			

=== District 37 ===
Iowa Senate, District 37 General Election, 1901
Party	Candidate	Votes	%
Republican	Fred Carlton Hartshorn	5,898	75.30%
Democratic	Irvin A. Stroup	1,935	24.70%
Total votes		7,833	100.00%
Republican hold			

=== District 38 ===
Iowa Senate, District 38 General Election, 1901
Party	Candidate	Votes	%
Republican	Orlando Billings Courtright	4,297	66.63%
Democratic	Ransom Bailey	2,152	33.37%
Total votes		6,449	100.00%
Republican hold			

=== District 42 ===
Iowa Senate, District 42 General Election, 1901
Party	Candidate	Votes	%
Democratic	Dennis Aloysius Lyons (incumbent)	3,828	50.34%
Republican	E. P. Johnson	3,619	47.59%
Prohibition	C. H. Graves	158	2.08%
Total votes		7,605	100.00%
Democratic hold			

=== District 44 ===
Iowa Senate, District 44 General Election, 1901
Party	Candidate	Votes	%
Republican	Edmund Cole Spaulding	3,457	51.64%
Democratic	W. S. Prouty	3,133	46.80%
Prohibition	L. J. Keyes	105	1.57%
Total votes		6,695	100.00%
Republican hold			

=== District 45 ===
Iowa Senate, District 45 General Election, 1901
Party	Candidate	Votes	%
Republican	W. P. Whipple	5,821	55.85%
Democratic	Albert E. Jackson	4,367	41.90%
Prohibition	H. L. Bassett	235	2.25%
Total votes		10,423	100.00%
Republican hold			

=== District 48 ===
Iowa Senate, District 48 General Election, 1901
Party	Candidate	Votes	%
Republican	Warren Garst (incumbent)	5,418	100.00%
Total votes		5,418	100.00%
Republican hold			

=== District 50 ===
Iowa Senate, District 50 General Election, 1901
Party	Candidate	Votes	%
Republican	Edward King Winne	4,111	74.14%
Democratic	Elwood Price Layman	1,434	25.86%
Total votes		5,545	100.00%
Republican hold			

== See also ==
- Elections in Iowa
