= Ola Babcock Miller Building =

- Iowa State Historical Building
- U.S. National Register of Historic Places
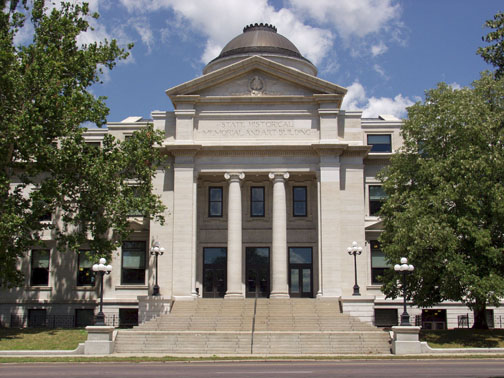

- Location within Iowa Location within the United States
- Location: E. 12th and Grand Ave. Des Moines, Iowa
- Coordinates: 41°35′34″N 93°36′9″W
- Area: approximately 1 acre (0.40 ha)
- Built: 1898-1899; 1904-1910
- Architect: Oliver O. Smith
- Architectural style: Beaux Arts
- NRHP reference No.: 78001251
- Added to NRHP: November 14, 1978

The Ola Babcock Miller Building, also known as the State Library of Iowa, is a historic building located in Des Moines, Iowa, United States. It was listed on the National Register of Historic Places in 1978 as the Iowa State Historical Building.

== History ==
The State Historical Department was established by the Iowa legislature in 1892. It was originally housed in three rooms of the Iowa State Capitol building. The west wing of this building was completed in 1899, and the Historical Department occupied it in March 1900. The legislature appropriated funds to complete the building, and it was finished in 1910. The building was designed by Des Moines architect Oliver O. Smith, and it is considered a good example of the Beaux Arts style. It is one of the oldest buildings in the Capitol Complex. The state historical society remained here until their present building was completed in 1987. After a historic renovation the building was renamed in honor of Ola Babcock Miller, Iowa's first female Secretary of State. The building now houses the State Library of Iowa, which has occupied space in the building since 1912.

== Architecture ==
The 260-by-70-foot (79 by 21 m) building features a facade that is organized into five parts, with three projecting pavilions that are connected by hyphens. The raised basement is faced in rusticated stone while the walls are composed of hollow tiles that are faced with limestone veneer. The plan for the central pavilion is a Greek cross. The portico is arranged distyle in antis with columns of the Ionic order. It is capped with a dome. The building's low, horizontal appearance contrasts with the relatively compact verticality of the capitol building across the street.
