= Bergeson =

Bergeson is a surname, and may refer to:

- Burnett Bergeson (1915–2011), American farmer and politician
- Eric Bergeson (born 1966), American football player
- James Bergeson (born 1961), American water polo player
- Marian Bergeson (1925–2016), American politician
- Pat Bergeson (born 1961), American musician
- Rollo H. Bergeson (1911–1993), American attorney and politician
- Thomas W. Bergeson (born 1962), United States Air Force general
