= Josiah H. Bonney =

American businessman and politician

Secretary of State of Iowa
- In office 1848–1850
- Governor: Ansel Briggs
- Preceded by: Elisha Cutler Jr.
- Succeeded by: George W. McCleary

Personal details
- Born: February 14, 1817 Steuben County, New York, U.S.
- Died: September 12, 1887 (aged 70)

Josiah Hinman Bonney (February 14, 1817 – September 12, 1887) was an American businessman and politician.

Born in Steuben County, New York, Bonney moved to Iowa Territory and eventually settled in Keosauqua, Van Buren County, Iowa Territory. He was a merchant. He was elected the first sheriff of Van Buren County and was a Democrat. From 1843 to 1845, Bonney served in the Iowa Territorial Legislative Assembly. He served as Iowa Secretary of State from 1848 to 1850.

== Notes ==
Political offices
Preceded by Elisha Cutler Jr.	Secretary of State of Iowa; 1848–1850	Succeeded by George W. McCleary
