= Lund–Hoel House =

Historic house museum in Canby, Minnesota, USA

- John G. Lund House
- U.S. National Register of Historic Places
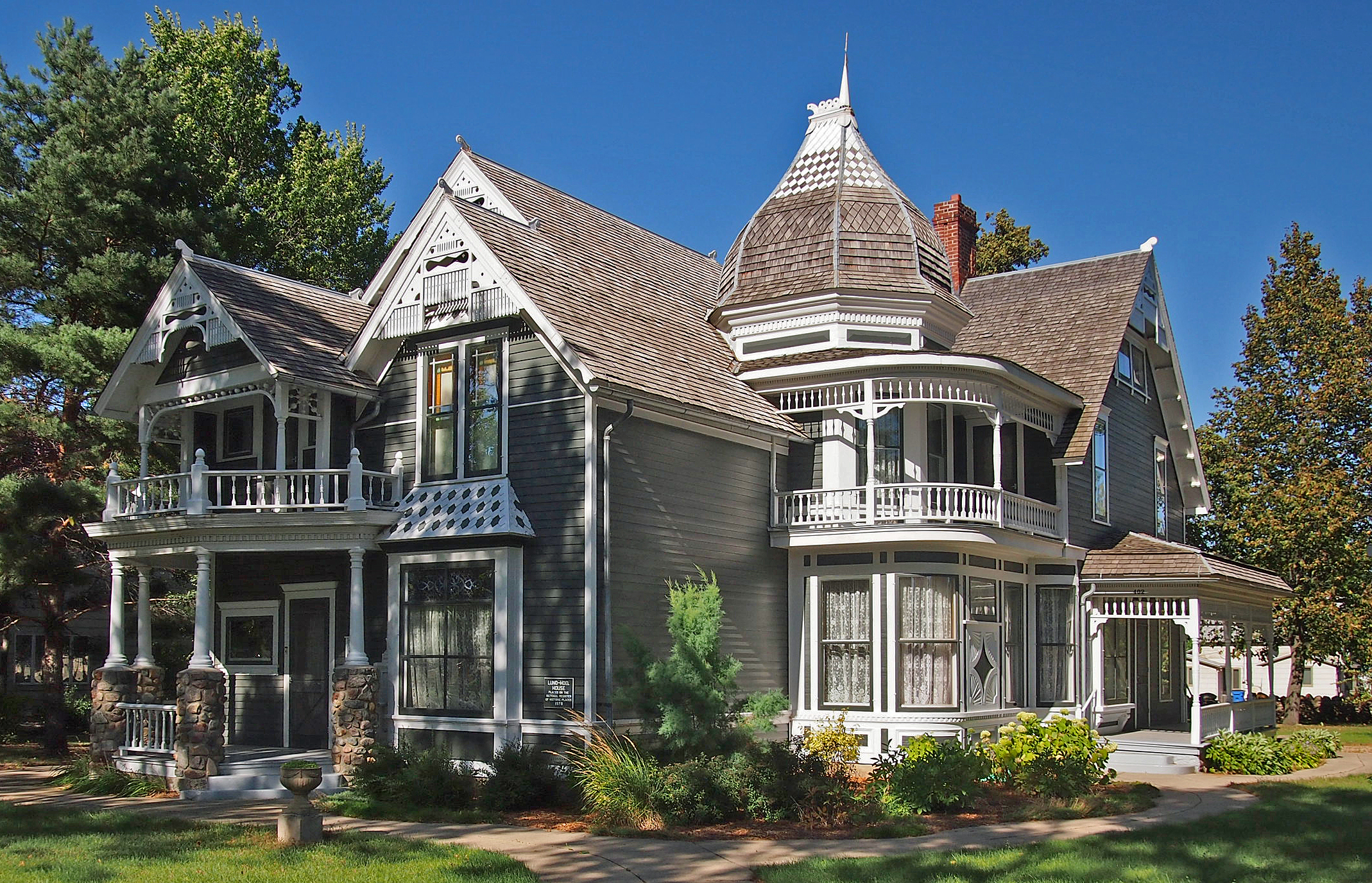
- The Lund–Hoel House from the south

- Location within Minnesota Location within the United States
- Location: 101 4th Street W, Canby, Minnesota
- Coordinates: 44°42′41″N 96°16′22″W
- Area: .48 acres (0.19 ha)
- Built: 1891, remodeled 1900
- Built by: H. Beiseker
- Architectural style: Queen Anne
- NRHP reference No.: 78001575
- Designated: October 2, 1978

The Lund–Hoel House is a historic house museum in Canby, Minnesota, United States. The residence and an adjacent carriage house were built in 1891 for John G. Lund (1868–1908), an influential land speculator, banker, and politician. Lund had the house extensively enlarged and remodeled in 1900. The property was listed on the National Register of Historic Places as the John G. Lund House in 1978 for having local significance in the themes of architecture and exploration/settlement. It was nominated for its association with Lund—who was instrumental in the settlement of Yellow Medicine County, established several banks in the region, and served as mayor of Canby—and as a fine example of Queen Anne architecture.

== See also ==
- National Register of Historic Places listings in Yellow Medicine County, Minnesota
