= 2006 Minnesota Amendment 1 =

Minnesota Amendment 1
- November 7, 2006

Results
Choice	Votes	%
Yes	1,270,042	60.25%
No	837,839	39.75%
Valid votes	2,107,881	100.00%
Invalid or blank votes	0	0.00%
Total votes	2,107,881	100.00%

2006 Minnesota Amendment 1 was a legislatively referred constitutional amendment. The amendment amended Article XIV of the Minnesota Constitution to allow for a new tax on the sale of motor vehicles, with revenue from the tax to be used to fund public transportation and highways in the state. The amendment was accepted with 60.25% of the vote.

The bill containing the amendment, HF 2461, was introduced to the Minnesota House of Representatives by Mary Liz Holberg, Connie Ruth, and Doug Magnus on April 20, 2005. After passing the house on May 12, 2005, it was introduced to the Minnesota Senate by Erin Murphy on May 13. It was passed by the Senate on May 18, and vetoed by governor Tim Pawlenty. However, the bill was amended by the House to make it a constitutional amendment, bypassing the veto and sending the bill to the public for approval. Prior to passage, it was unclear if enough of the public was even aware enough of the amendment to secure its passage. It was criticized by a coalition of rural mayors and legislators, arguing that the amendment would not generate enough funds for greater Minnesota, with the fear being that urban public transit would take most of the funds.

The question on the ballot read: "Shall the Minnesota Constitution be amended to dedicate revenue from a tax on the sale of new and used motor vehicles over a five-year period, so that after June 30, 2011, all of the revenue is dedicated at least 40 percent for public transit assistance and not more than 60 percent for highway purposes?"

== Results ==
Choice	Votes	%
For	1,270,042	60.25
Against	837,839	39.75
Total	2,107,881	100.00
