= Elaine Baxter =

American politician and educator (1933–2021)

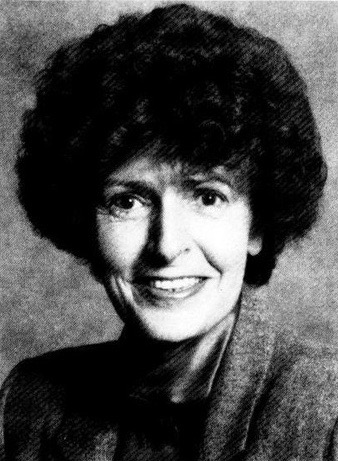

27th Secretary of State of Iowa
- In office 1987–1995
- Governor: Terry Branstad
- Preceded by: Mary Jane Odell
- Succeeded by: Paul Pate

Personal details
- Born: January 16, 1933 Chicago, Illinois, U.S.
- Died: March 26, 2021 (aged 88) West Burlington, Iowa, U.S.
- Party: Democratic
- Spouse: Harry Youngs Baxter
- Children: 3
- Education: University of Illinois
- Profession: Teacher

Elaine Bland Baxter (January 16, 1933 – March 26, 2021) was an American politician and educator who served as the 27th Iowa Secretary of State.

== Personal life ==
She was the daughter of Clarence Arthur Bland and Margaret Clark Bland. She married Harry Youngs Baxter, in 1954; they have three children, Katherine, Harry and John. She died on March 26, 2021, aged 88.

== Education ==
She received her B.A. in International Affairs from the University of Illinois in 1954, a teaching certificate in secondary level Social Studies from Iowa Wesleyan College in 1970 and an M.S. in Urban and Regional Planning from the University of Iowa in 1978. She also received graduate training at the Harvard University Kennedy School of Government.

== Political career ==
Baxter was a member of the Iowa House of Representatives' 60th District from 1983 to 1986, and she served two terms as Iowa Secretary of State from 1986 to 1994.

She was also a delegate to Democratic National Convention from Iowa in 1988 and 1992; was a member of the Democratic National Committee from Iowa in 1988; was a candidate for U.S. representative from Iowa's 3rd congressional district in 1992 and 1994.

Iowa governor Thomas Vilsack appointed her to the Humanities Iowa board of directors. She joined the Iowa Lottery Board in 2002.

Baxter endorsed Hillary Clinton in the 2008 US presidential election.

== Community involvement ==
Baxter was active in civic organizations, including the Burlington planning commission, the Burlington City Council and the Victorian Society of Iowa. She served on various boards, including the Preservation Action, Washington, D.C. (1980–1984), the Iowa Alliance for Historic Preservation, the Heritage Trust for Preservation of Historic Burlington and the Terrace Hill Society.

Party political offices
Preceded by Al Sorenson	Democratic nominee for Secretary of State of Iowa; 1986, 1990	Succeeded by Anne Pedersen
Political offices
Preceded by Mary Jane Odell	Secretary of State of Iowa; 1987–1995	Succeeded by Paul Pate
