= Walter C. Ramsay =

American journalist

Walter Ramsay

15th Secretary of State of Iowa
- In office 1919–1928
- Governor: Nathan E. Kendall; John Hammill
- Preceded by: William S. Allen
- Succeeded by: Edward McMurray Smith

Mayor of Belmond, Iowa
- In office 1906–1914

Personal details
- Born: August 15, 1878 Ford County, Illinois, U.S.
- Died: February 9, 1928 (aged 50) Des Moines, Iowa, U.S.
- Party: Republican

Walter C. Ramsay (August 15, 1878 – February 9, 1928) was an American politician and newspaper editor who served as the 15th secretary of state of Iowa from 1919 to 1929.

== Early life ==
Born in Ford County, Illinois, Ramsay attended public schools in Paxton, Illinois and Owatonna High School in Owatonna, Minnesota.

== Career ==
In 1900, Ramsey and his brother purchased the Iowa Valley Press in Belmond, Iowa. In 1924, Ramsay and his brother purchased the Belmond Herald, which later become the Belmond Herald-Press. He served as assistant clerk for the Iowa General Assembly from 1904 to 1906. He then was appointed postmaster of Belmond, Iowa in 1906 and served until 1914. From 1914 to 1918, Ramsay served as mayor of Belmond. He also served as chief clerk for the Iowa General Assembly from 1915 to 1919. In 1919, Ramsay was appointed Iowa secretary of state and served until his death in 1928. He was a Republican.

== Death ==
Ramsay died from a stroke at his home in Des Moines, Iowa.

== Notes ==
Political offices
Preceded by William S. Allen	Secretary of State of Iowa; 1919–1928	Succeeded by Edward M. Smith
