= William S. Allen =

American politician and lawyer (1857–1926)

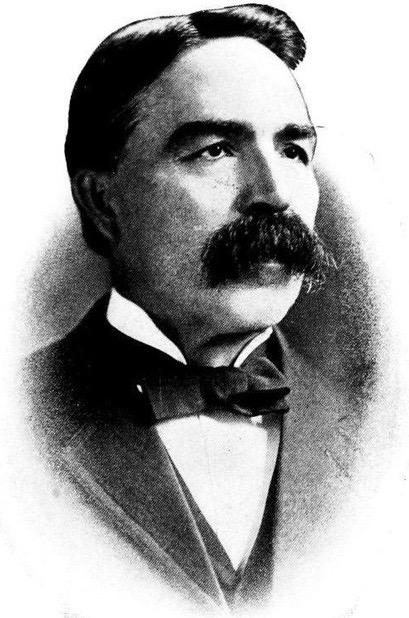
- Allen in 1913

14th Secretary of State of Iowa
- In office 1913–1919
- Preceded by: William C. Hayward
- Succeeded by: Walter C. Ramsay

Member of the Iowa Senate from the 2nd district
- In office January 11, 1909 – January 12, 1913
- Preceded by: James Elercik
- Succeeded by: John Taylor

Member of the Iowa House of Representatives from the 2nd district
- In office January 8, 1894 – January 9, 1898

Personal details
- Born: William Sylvester Allen; August 26, 1857 Hillsboro, Iowa, U.S.
- Died: December 6, 1926 (aged 69) Fairfield, Iowa, U.S.
- Party: Republican
- Education: University of Iowa
- Occupation: Politician, lawyer

William Sylvester Allen (August 26, 1857 – December 6, 1926) was an American politician and lawyer.

Born in Hillsboro, Henry County, Iowa, Allen went to the Hillsboro Public Schools. He then graduated from the University of Iowa law department and was admitted to the Iowa bar. Allen practiced law in Birmingham, Van Buren County, Iowa. He served as mayor of Birmingham and on the Birmingham School Board. From 1894 to 1898, Allen served in the Iowa House of Representatives and was a Republican. He then served in the Iowa State Senate from 1909 to 1913. From 1913 to 1919, Allen served as Iowa Secretary of State. He then continued to practice law in Fairfield, Iowa, where he died.

Political offices
Preceded by William C. Hayward	Secretary of State of Iowa; 1913–1919	Succeeded by W. C. Ramsay
