= Elijah Sells =

American politician

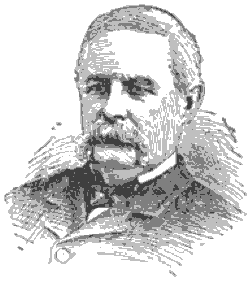
- Born: February 15, 1814; Franklin County, Ohio
- Died: March 13, 1897 (aged 83); Salt Lake City, Utah
- Occupations: Military officer, politician, businessman
- Political party: Whig

Elijah Sells (February 15, 1814 – March 13, 1897) was an American military officer, politician, and businessman.

== Biography ==
Born in Franklin County, Ohio, Sells moved to Scott County, Illinois in 1833 and was in the stoneware business. He campaigned for William Henry Harrison on the Whig Party ticket in the 1840 election. Sells then moved to Iowa Territory in 1841 and settled in Muscatine, Iowa Territory. In 1844, Sells served in the first Iowa Constitutional Convention. Sells then served in the Iowa House of Representatives from 1846 to 1848 and from 1852 to 1854 and was a Whig. Sells served as Iowa Secretary of State from 1857 to 1863 as Republican. Sells served in the United States Navy during the American Civil War and was acting master of the USS Grampus in 1863 in Cincinnati, Ohio. Sells served as auditor of the United States Department of the Treasury. Sells then served as Superintendent of Indian Affairs in the Indian Territory. Sells moved to Douglas County, Kansas and served in the Kansas House of Representatives in 1870, 1871, and 1872 and was a Republican. In 1878, Sells moved to Utah Territory and was in the lumber business. From 1889 to 1893, Sells served as Secretary of the Utah Territory and was involved with the Republican Party. Sells died in Salt Lake City, Utah.

== Notes ==
Political offices
Preceded by George W. McCleary	Secretary of State of Iowa; 1856–1863	Succeeded by James Wright
