= William M. McFarland =

American politician (1848–1905)

William M. McFarland (April 1, 1848 – July 15, 1905) was an American newspaper editor, lawyer and politician.

Born in Posey County, Indiana, McFarland moved with his parents to Van Buren County, Iowa. He went to a public school and then graduated from Iowa Wesleyan University. He studied law and was admitted to the Iowa bar. McFarland was also involved with in real estate and insurance businesses. McFarland started the Brooklyn Chronicle newspaper in Brooklyn, Iowa and then the Estherville Vindicator newspaper in Estherville, Iowa. While living in Estherville, Iowa, McFarland served in the Iowa House of Representatives from 1888 to 1892 and was a Republican. He then served as Iowa Secretary of State from 1891 to 1897. He then lived in Indianola, Iowa until his death. McFarland died suddenly from a heart attack while at the Saint Paul Union Depot in Saint Paul, Minnesota.

== Notes ==
Political offices
Preceded by Frank D. Jackson	Secretary of State of Iowa; 1891–1897	Succeeded by George L. Dobson
