= 1893 Iowa gubernatorial election =

- November 7, 1893

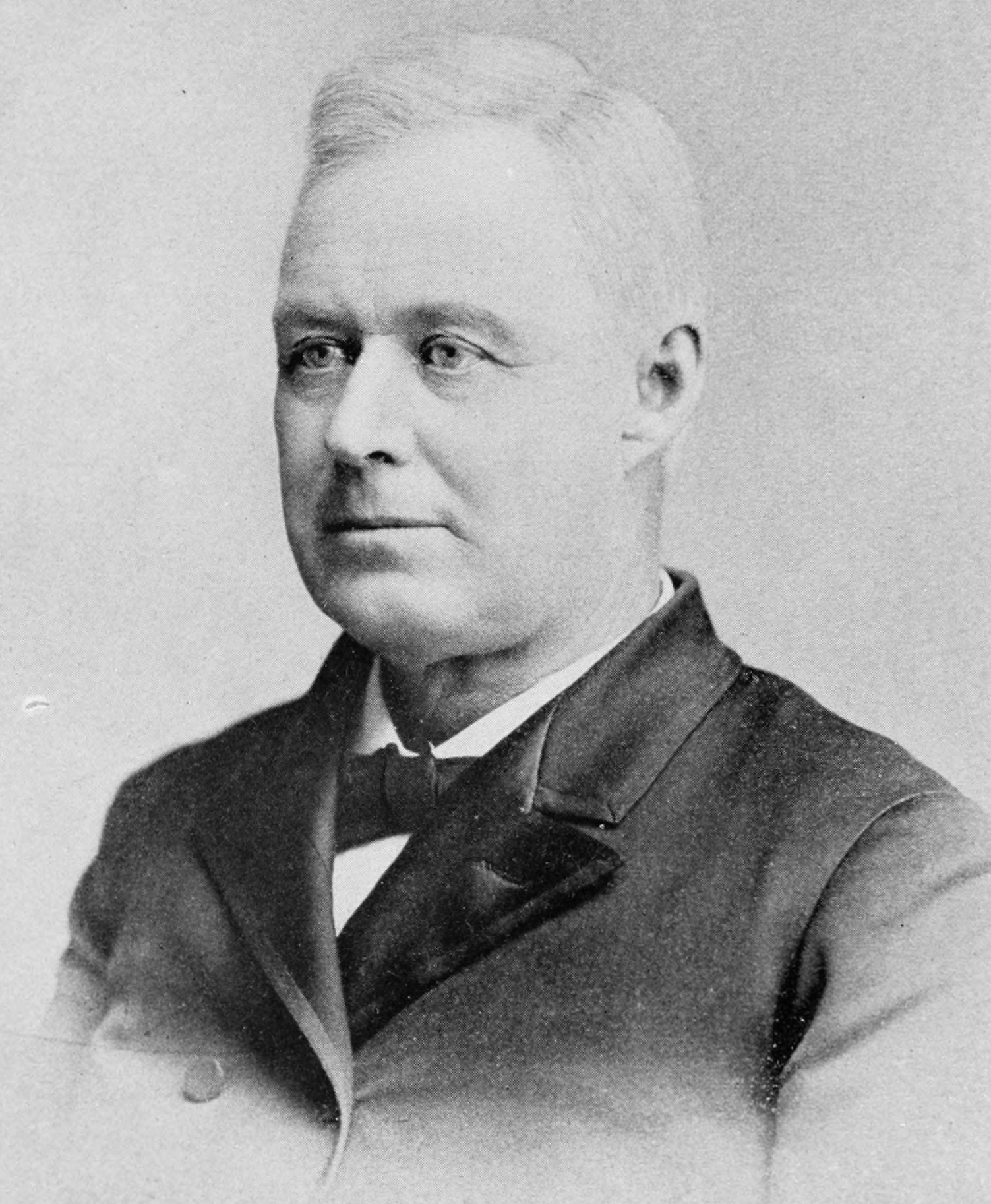

Nominee	Frank D. Jackson	Horace Boies	J. M. Joseph
Party	Republican	Democratic	Populist
Popular vote	206,821	174,656	23,980
Percentage	49.74%	42.00%	5.77%
- County results Jackson: 40–50% 50–60% 60–70% Boies: 30–40% 40–50% 50–60% 60–70% Joseph: 40–50%
Governor before election
Horace Boies
Democratic
Elected Governor
Frank D. Jackson
Republican

The 1893 Iowa gubernatorial election was held on November 7, 1893. Republican nominee Frank D. Jackson defeated Democratic incumbent Horace Boies with 49.74% of the vote.

== General election ==
=== Candidates ===
Major party candidates

- Frank D. Jackson, Republican
- Horace Boies, Democratic

Other candidates

- J. M. Joseph, People's
- Bennett Mitchell, Prohibition

=== Results ===
1893 Iowa gubernatorial election
Party	Candidate	Votes	%	±%
Republican	Frank D. Jackson	206,821	49.74%	
Democratic	Horace Boies (incumbent)	174,656	42.00%	
Populist	J. M. Joseph	23,980	5.77%	
Prohibition	Bennett Mitchell	10,349	2.49%	
Majority		32,165		
Turnout				
Republican gain from Democratic		Swing		
