= Wayne M. Ropes =

American politician and businessman

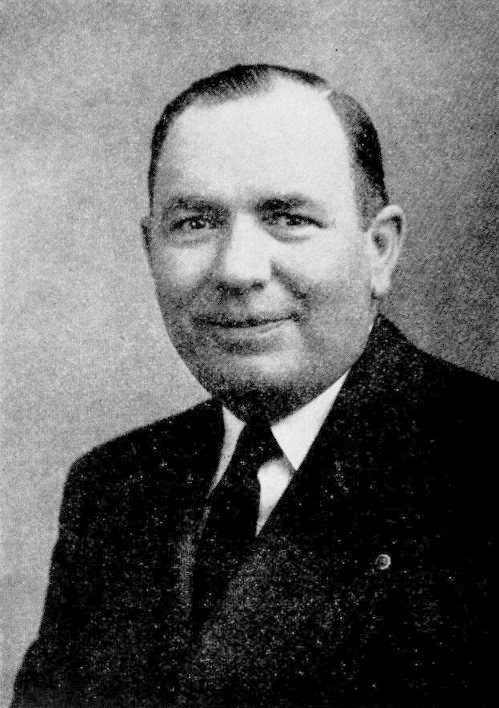

Wayne M. Ropes (October 23, 1898 – July 18, 1948) was an American politician and businessman.

Born in Onawa, Monona County, Iowa, Ropes graduated from Onawa High School in 1916. He then served in the United States Navy during World War I. He went to the National Business College in Sioux City, Iowa and to the Hohenshuh-Carpenter College of Embalding in Des Moines, Iowa. Ropes worked as an accountant and with the Iowa State Banking Association. From 1925 to 1933, Ropes served as county auditor for Monona County. Ropes was involved with the Republican Party. From 1939 to 1941, Ropes served in the Iowa House of Representatives for District 57. Then, from 1943 to 1947, Ropes served as the Iowa Secretary of State. Ropes died in a hospital in Des Moines, Iowa from a stroke.

== Notes ==
Political offices
Preceded by Earl G. Miller	Secretary of State of Iowa; 1943–1947	Succeeded by Rollo H. Bergeson
