= Belmond, Iowa =

- City
- Location of Belmond, Iowa
- Coordinates: 42°50′48″N 93°37′02″W
- Country: USA
- State: Iowa
- County: Wright
- Incorporated: October 21, 1881

Area
  - Total: 2.83 sq mi (7.34 km^{2})
  - Land: 2.83 sq mi (7.34 km^{2})
  - Water: 0 sq mi (0.00 km^{2})
- Elevation: 1,184 ft (361 m)

Population (2020)
  - Total: 2,463
  - Density: 869.5/sq mi (335.72/km^{2})
- Time zone: UTC-6 (Central (CST))
  - Summer (DST): UTC-5 (CDT)
- ZIP code: 50421
- Area code: 641
- FIPS code: 19-05680
- GNIS feature ID: 2394123
- Website: belmondiowa.com

Belmond is a city in Wright County, Iowa, United States. It is located along U.S. Route 69, 14 miles (23 km) by road from Clarion, the county seat. The population was 2,463 in the 2020 census, a decline from 2,560 in 2000.

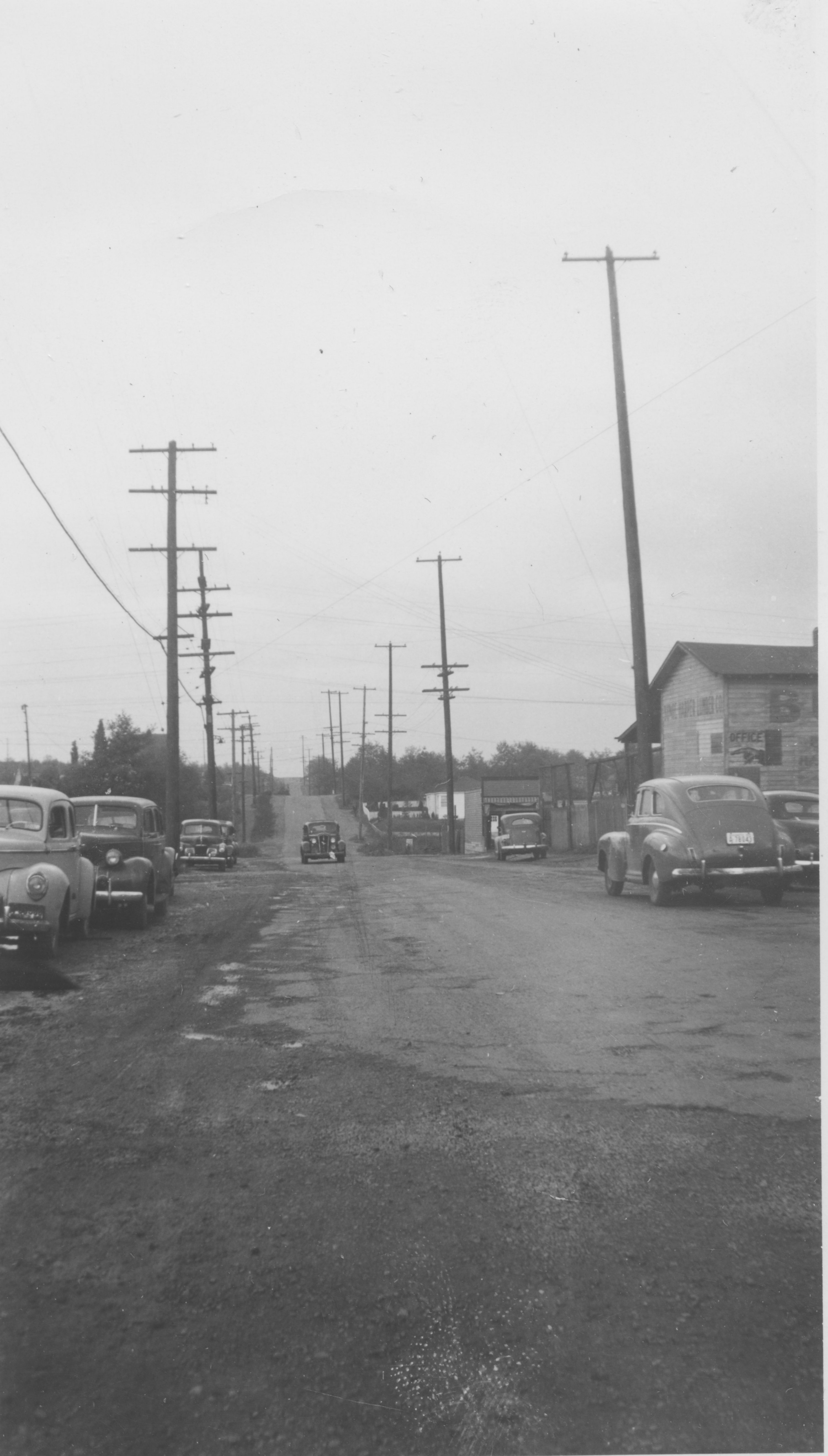
Main Street, Belmond, Iowa 1945

== History ==
On October 14, 1966, an F5 tornado ripped apart the community, destroying or damaging about 600 homes and 75 businesses. Six people were killed and large swaths of the town were left in ruins. On June 12, 2013, an EF3 tornado affected the northern sections of town by damaging or destroying several businesses and homes.

Belmond was impacted by major flooding in the June 2008 Midwest floods, along with many other parts of the state of Iowa.

== Geography ==
Belmond is located on the Iowa River.

According to the United States Census Bureau, the city has a total area of 2.85 square miles (7.38 km^{2}), all land.

== Demographics ==
Historical population
Census	Pop.	Note	%±
1890	803		—
1900	1,234		53.7%
1910	1,224		−0.8%
1920	1,797		46.8%
1930	1,733		−3.6%
1940	2,109		21.7%
1950	2,169		2.8%
1960	2,506		15.5%
1970	2,358		−5.9%
1980	2,505		6.2%
1990	2,500		−0.2%
2000	2,560		2.4%
2010	2,376		−7.2%
2020	2,463		3.7%
U.S. Decennial Census

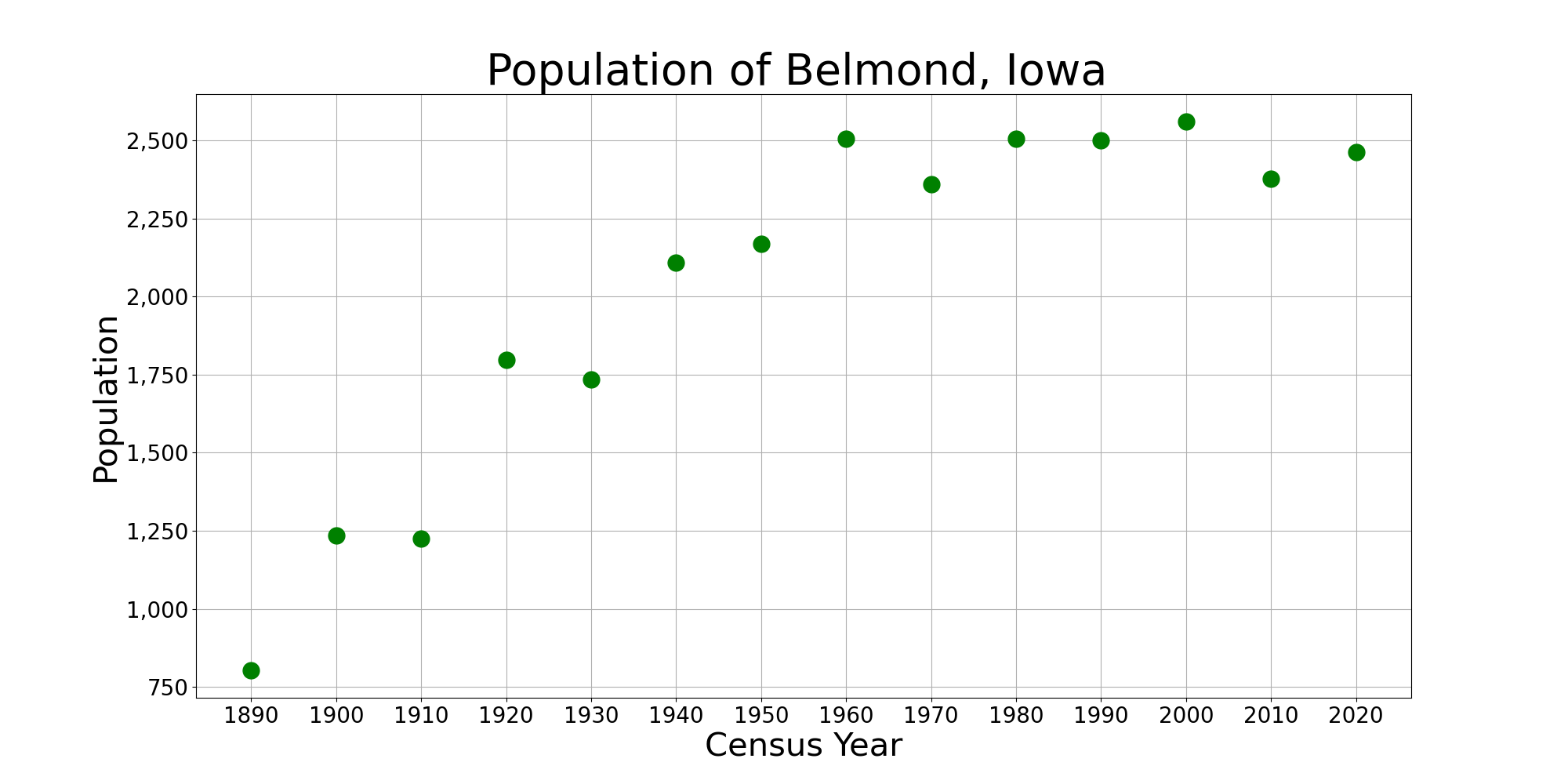
The population of Belmond, Iowa from US census data

=== 2020 census ===
As of the 2020 census, Belmond had a population of 2,463, with 1,071 households and 658 families residing in the city. The population density was 869.5 inhabitants per square mile (335.7/km^{2}). There were 1,186 housing units at an average density of 418.7 per square mile (161.7/km^{2}).

Of the 1,071 households, 27.9% had children under the age of 18 living with them. Of all households, 45.1% were married-couple households, 6.0% were cohabiting-couple households, 30.5% had a female householder with no spouse or partner present, and 18.4% had a male householder with no spouse or partner present. About 38.6% of households were non-families, 32.9% of all households were made up of individuals, and 17.6% had someone living alone who was 65 years of age or older.

There were 1,186 housing units, of which 9.7% were vacant. The homeowner vacancy rate was 2.7% and the rental vacancy rate was 11.6%.

The median age was 42.1 years. 24.2% of residents were under the age of 18 and 24.8% were 65 years of age or older. 26.0% of residents were under the age of 20; 4.3% were between the ages of 20 and 24; 22.8% were from 25 to 44; and 22.0% were from 45 to 64. The gender makeup of the city was 48.2% male and 51.8% female. For every 100 females there were 93.2 males, and for every 100 females age 18 and over there were 86.8 males age 18 and over.

0.0% of residents lived in urban areas, while 100.0% lived in rural areas.

Racial composition as of the 2020 census
Race	Number	Percent
White	1,975	80.2%
Black or African American	24	1.0%
American Indian and Alaska Native	21	0.9%
Asian	12	0.5%
Native Hawaiian and Other Pacific Islander	0	0.0%
Some other race	182	7.4%
Two or more races	249	10.1%
Hispanic or Latino (of any race)	470	19.1%

=== 2010 census ===
As of the census of 2010, there were 2,376 people, 1,047 households, and 649 families residing in the city. The population density was 833.7 inhabitants per square mile (321.9/km^{2}). There were 1,197 housing units at an average density of 420.0 per square mile (162.2/km^{2}). The racial makeup of the city was 93.2% White, 0.1% African American, 0.2% Native American, 0.3% Asian, 0.2% Pacific Islander, 4.2% from other races, and 1.9% from two or more races. Hispanic or Latino of any race were 12.1% of the population.

There were 1,047 households, of which 26.9% had children under the age of 18 living with them, 50.3% were married couples living together, 7.8% had a female householder with no husband present, 3.8% had a male householder with no wife present, and 38.0% were non-families. 35.1% of all households were made up of individuals, and 19.2% had someone living alone who was 65 years of age or older. The average household size was 2.21 and the average family size was 2.82.

The median age in the city was 45.9 years. 23.4% of residents were under the age of 18; 6% were between the ages of 18 and 24; 19.8% were from 25 to 44; 27.3% were from 45 to 64; and 23.4% were 65 years of age or older. The gender makeup of the city was 48.1% male and 51.9% female.

=== 2000 census ===
As of the census of 2000, there were 2,560 people, 1,119 households, and 675 families residing in the city. The population density was 896.9 inhabitants per square mile (346.3/km^{2}). There were 1,202 housing units at an average density of 421.1 per square mile (162.6/km^{2}). The racial makeup of the city was 94.84% White, 0.23% Black or African-American, 0.12% Native-American, 0.20% Asian, 3.95% from other races, and 0.66% from two or more races. Hispanic or Latino of any race were 5.62% of the population.

There were 1,119 households, out of which 26.6% had children under the age of 18 living with them, 51.6% were married couples living together, 6.7% had a female householder with no husband present, and 39.6% were non-families. 36.6% of all households were made up of individuals, and 21.4% had someone living alone who was 65 years of age or older. The average household size was 2.22 and the average family size was 2.90.

Age spread: 23.0% under the age of 18, 6.8% from 18 to 24, 23.3% from 25 to 44, 21.8% from 45 to 64, and 25.1% 65 years of age or older. The median age was 43 years. For every 100 females, there were 88.0 males. For every 100 females age 18 and over, there were 82.3 males.

The median income for a household in the city was $32,841, and the median income for a family was $43,393. Males had a median income of $30,270 versus $20,664 for females. The per capita income for the city was $17,317. About 2.6% of families and 5.7% of the population were below the poverty line, including 5.9% of those under age 18 and 6.8% of those age 65 or over.

== Economy ==
The community has and continues to complete several community projects including industrial park and spec building, new elementary school, high school renovations, renovated library, new city hall, new fire station, community-owned movie theater, new daycare center, assisted living facility, street improvements, new water treatment facility, housing developments, several business expansions and developments, etc.

=== Housing ===
The Belmond Housing Council and the City of Belmond established the Dumond Estates 40-lot housing subdivision in 1997. There are two housing incentive programs available in Belmond, which emphasize building in Dumond Estates.

== Parks and recreation ==
Belmond maintains several well-kept city parks. In recent years the Belmond community has built a new fire station, city hall, walking trail, new water treatment facility, a new medical clinic and a new $27 million hospital. The Iowa River flows through Belmond, past a river park. Belmond has a country club and golf course. Luick Memorial Swimming Pool features a giant water slide and has recently been updated with other water features. There are plans to build a walking trail from Mason City to Belmond that could eventually connect to the Three Rivers Trail.

== Education ==
Belmond–Klemme Community School District serves Belmond. The district formed on July 1, 1994, with the merger of the Belmond and Klemme districts.

== Health care ==
Iowa Specialty Hospital-Belmond, a 22-bed critical access hospital, serves the healthcare needs of the community. The hospital built a new medical clinic in 2000. In February 2007 the hospital began a cooperative agreement with the hospital in Clarion, a neighboring community. Iowa Specialty Hospitals in Belmond and Clarion have experienced significant growth in recent years. Medical clinics have been opened in the neighboring towns of Garner, Hampton and Webster City. The agreement between Clarion and Belmond is the first of its kind in the state. The two hospitals now employ over 300 people.

== Notable people ==
- Duane Benson, Minnesota state senator and former AFL/NFL player
- Sean McLaughlin: former MSNBC meteorologist and "Today Show" weather anchor
- Walter C. Ramsay, Iowa Secretary of State and newspaper editor
