= Solomon F. Prouty =

American politician (1854–1927)

Solomon Francis Prouty
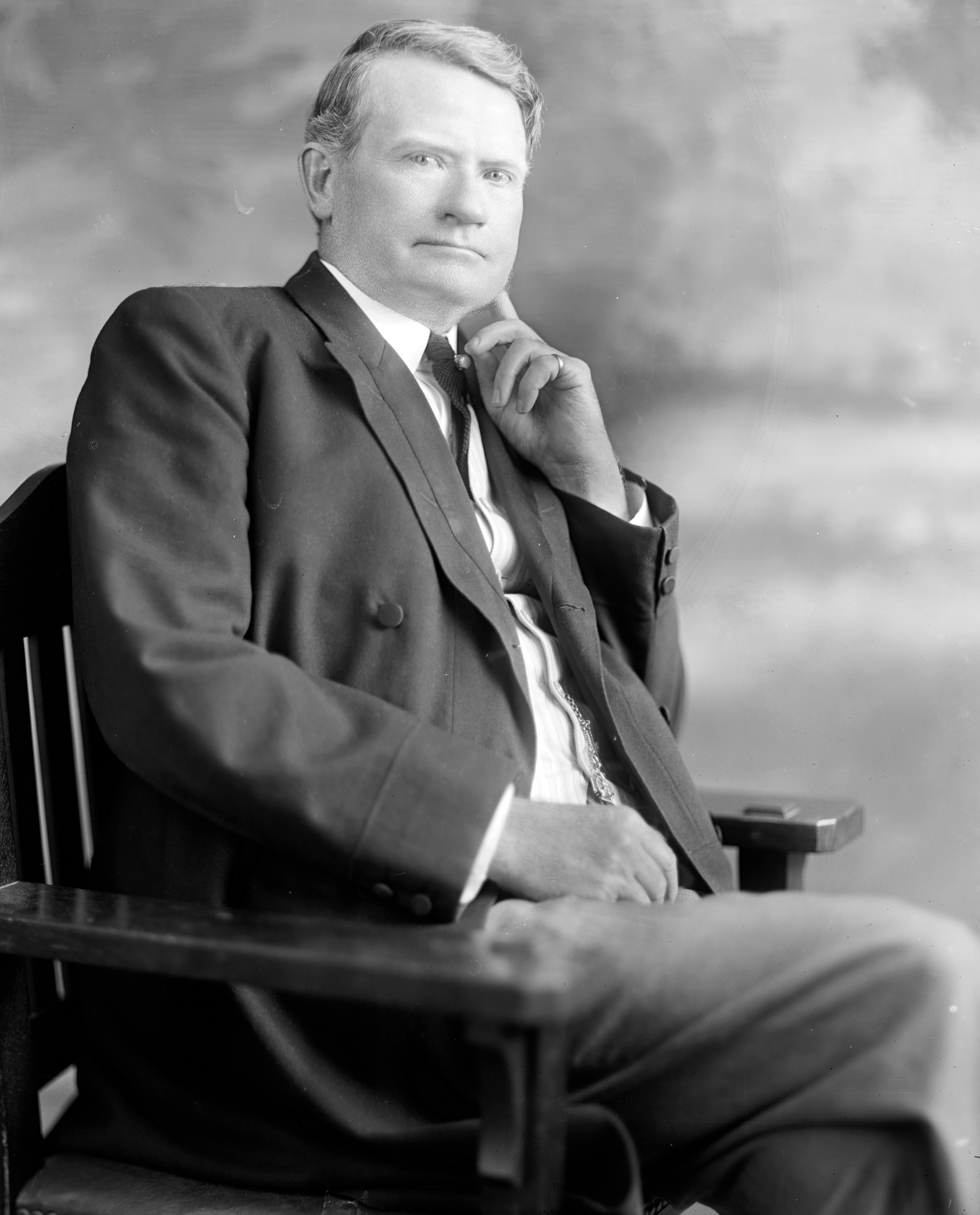

Member of the U.S. House of Representatives from Iowa's 7th district
- In office March 4, 1911 – March 3, 1915
- Preceded by: John A. T. Hull
- Succeeded by: Cassius C. Dowell

Personal details
- Born: January 17, 1854 Delaware, Ohio, U.S.
- Died: July 16, 1927 (aged 73) Des Moines, Iowa, U.S.
- Resting place: Glendale Cemetery
- Party: Republican
- Education: Central College

Solomon Francis Prouty (January 17, 1854 – July 16, 1927) was an academic, lawyer and politician, serving as a one-term state legislator, Iowa trial court judge, and a two-term Republican U.S. Representative from Iowa's 7th congressional district.

== Life ==
Born in Delaware, Ohio in 1854, Prouty was taken as an infant by his father when he moved to Marion County, Iowa, in 1855, a few years after the last of Indian Removal. There he attended newly founded local public schools. He went to state colleges: Central College (then known as the Central University of Iowa) in Pella, Iowa from 1870 to 1873; Simpson College in Indianola, Iowa from 1873 to 1875; and graduated from Central College in 1877.

Prouty taught for several years, serving as a professor of Latin at Central College from 1878 to 1882. He entered politics, joining the Republican Party. In 1879, he was elected to one two-year term in the Iowa House of Representatives, serving in 1880 and 1881.

He later studied law, was admitted to the bar in 1882, and commenced practice in Pella. He moved to the state capital of Des Moines, in 1891 and practiced law there. He served as a judge of the district court in 1899.

Wanting to participate in national politics, Prouty ran for election to Congress from Iowa in 1902, 1904, and 1908, but was defeated each time. But in 1910, Prouty won the Republican nomination for the U.S. House for Iowa's 7th congressional district, and defeated his opponents in the November general election. He was re-elected two years later to his second (and last) term. In all, he served in the Sixty-second and Sixty-third Congresses, from March 4, 1911 to March 3, 1915.

Prouty decided against running again in 1914 and was not a candidate for nomination. Because of his initial ambivalence about running for a third term, political cartoonist "Ding" Darling caricatured him in several front-page cartoons in the Des Moines Register and Leader.

He resumed the practice of law for more than another decade. Prouty also served as trustee of the Central College. He died in Des Moines, Iowa on July 16, 1927. He was interred in Glendale Cemetery.

U.S. House of Representatives
Preceded by John A. T. Hull	Member of the U.S. House of Representatives from Iowa's 7th congressional district March 4, 1911 – March 3, 1915 (obsolete district)	Succeeded by Cassius C. Dowell
