= Frank D. Jackson =

American politician

15th Governor of Iowa
- In office January 11, 1894 – January 16, 1896
- Lieutenant: Warren S. Dungan
- Preceded by: Horace Boies
- Succeeded by: Francis M. Drake

9th Iowa Secretary of State
- In office 1885–1891
- Governor: Buren R. Sherman; William Larrabee
- Deputy: C.S. Byrkit
- Preceded by: John A. T. Hull
- Succeeded by: William M. McFarland

Secretary of the Iowa Senate
- In office 1882–1884

Personal details
- Born: Frank Darr Jackson; January 26, 1854 Arcade, New York, U.S.
- Died: November 16, 1938 (aged 84) Redlands, California, U.S.
- Party: Republican
- Spouse: Anna F. Brock (m. 1877)
- Children: 4
- Education: Iowa Agricultural College (no degree); University of Iowa Law (LLD)
- Profession: Lawyer

Military service
- Branch/service: Iowa National Guard
- Rank: Assistant Adjutant General of the Iowa National Guard

Frank Darr Jackson (January 26, 1854 – November 16, 1938) was an American politician who served as the 15th governor of Iowa, serving one term from 1894 to 1896.

== Early life ==
Jackson was born in Arcade, New York to Hiram W. Jackson, a school teacher, and Marion (Jenks) Jackson. In 1867, the family moved to Jesup, Iowa.

Jackson attended Iowa Agricultural College, but dropped out in 1872 to attended the University of Iowa Law School, receiving a LLD. He was admitted to the bar on his 21st birthday in 1875. He started practicing in Independence, Iowa for 5 years. He then practiced law in Greene, Iowa, starting in 1880, partnering with C. N. Greene. He also served as Assistant Adjunct General of the Iowa National Guard.

He married Anna Brock on November 16, 1877, and had 4 sons. Anna was born in Canada in 1856.

== Iowa Secretary of State ==
Jackson's political career start when he became the Secretary of the Iowa Senate from 1882 to 1884. Then from 1885 to 1891, he was Iowa Secretary of State. During his tenure, in 1886, he established the Iowa Official Register.

== Business career ==
Jackson, with friend Sidney Foster, created Royal Union Life Insurance Company, becoming President of the company. The huge success of this business led to his run for Governor.

== Governor of Iowa ==
He was elected governor as a Republican in 1893, defeating incumbent Horace Boies, but did not seek reelection in 1895.

During his tenure, he worked to better fund state agencies and helped to enact the Mulct Law, a work around the state prohibition on alcohol. It allowed saloons to sell alcohol as long as the establishment paid a fee. He also helped to raise the inheritance tax in Iowa, stating "he saw “no good reason why the state of Iowa should not increase its revenues by taxing franchises, writs and express companies, and by levying upon collateral inheritance.” He helped to create a monument in remembrance of the Spirit Lake Massacre and suggested funding for a historical building in Des Moines, becoming the State Historical Museum of Iowa. He established the Iowa Board of Parole to help make prison more humanitarian.

== Later life ==
Jackson resumed his position as president of the Royal Union Life Insurance Company until he retired in 1924, and then moved to California later that year. He died at his home in Redlands, California on November 16, 1938, and he was interred in Hillside Cemetery in Redlands. His wife, Anna, died on October 16, 1940, in California.

Party political offices
Preceded by Herman C. Wheeler	Republican nominee Governor of Iowa; 1893	Succeeded by Francis M. Drake
Political offices
Preceded by John A. T. Hull	Secretary of State of Iowa; 1885–1891	Succeeded by William M. McFarland
Preceded by Horace Boies	Governor of Iowa; 1894–1896	Succeeded by Francis M. Drake
