= Josiah T. Young =

American politician

Josiah Young

Member of the Iowa House of Representatives
- In office 1890–1892

7th Secretary of State of Iowa
- In office 1873–1879
- Governor: Cyrus C. Carpenter; Samuel J. Kirkwood; John H. Gear
- Preceded by: Ed Wright
- Succeeded by: John A. T. Hull

Personal details
- Born: Josiah Titus Young; February 25, 1831 Johnson County, Indiana, U.S.
- Died: November 11, 1907 (aged 76) Albia, Iowa, U.S.
- Party: Republican

Military service
- Allegiance: Union Army
- Unit: 8th Iowa Infantry Regiment
- Battles/wars: American Civil War

Josiah Titus Young (February 25, 1831 – November 11, 1907) was an American politician, lawyer and newspaper editor.

== Early life ==
Born in Johnson County, Indiana, Young moved with his family to Monroe County, Iowa. Raised on a farm, Young attended school in Warren County, Illinois.

== Career ==
During the American Civil War, Young served in the 8th Iowa Infantry Regiment. Young was the editor and publisher of The Monroe County Sentinel and The Albia Union newspapers. He also was a lawyer. Young served as clerk for the Monroe County District Court as a Republican. From 1873 to 1879, Young served as secretary of state of Iowa. In 1880, Young served as mayor of Albia, Iowa. Young then served in the Iowa House of Representatives from 1890 to 1892.

== Personal life ==
Young died at his home in Albia, Iowa.
