= Melvin D. Synhorst =

American politician

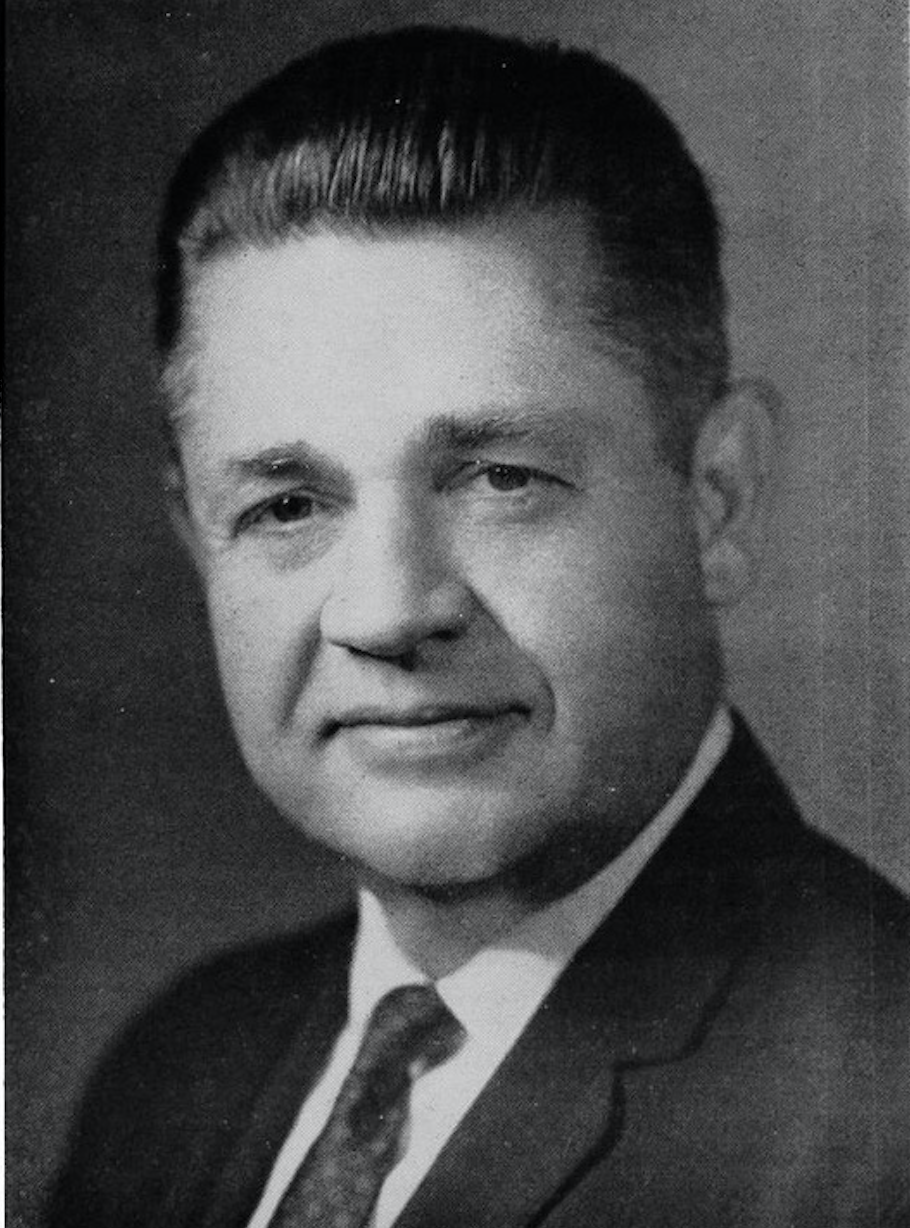
Synhorst in 1967

Melvin D. Synhorst (January 21, 1914 – March 28, 1999) was the Iowa Secretary of State from 1949 to 1965 and from 1967 to 1980. Elected on November 2, 1948, and on November 8, 1966, he was a native of Sioux County. Serving for the two years between his terms was Gary L. Cameron. Synhorst's second term ended at his resignation; he was replaced by Mary Jane Odell. From 1959 to 1960, Synhorst was the president of the National Association of Secretaries of State.

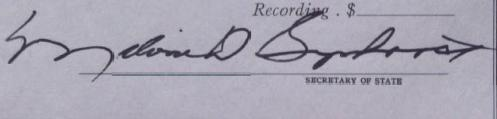
Synhorst's signature

Party political offices
Preceded by Rollo H. Bergeson	Republican nominee for Secretary of State of Iowa; 1948, 1950, 1952, 1954, 1956, 1958, 1960, 1962, 1964, 1966, 1968, 1970, 1972, 1974, 1978	Succeeded by Mary Jane Odell
Political offices
Preceded by Rollo H. Bergeson	Secretary of State of Iowa; 1949–1965	Succeeded by Gary L. Cameron
Preceded by Gary L. Cameron	Secretary of State of Iowa; 1967–1980	Succeeded by Mary Jane Odell
