= William B. Martin =

American businessman and politician

William B. Martin (March 17, 1846 – June 11, 1916) was an American businessman and politician.

Born in Rochester, Vermont, Martin went to public school in Orange County, Vermont. He tried to enlisted in the 4th Vermont Infantry during the American Civil War and was rejected because he was sixteen years old. In 1869, Martin moved to Adair County, Iowa and settled in Greenfield, Iowa. He open a real estate and loan business in Greenfield. Martin served as mayor of Greenfield and on the Greenfield City Council. He also served as county auditor for Adair County and was a Republican. From 1894 to 1898, Marti served in the Iowa House of Representatives. Then, from 1901 to 1907, Martin served as Iowa Secretary of State. Martin died at his home in Des Moines, Iowa.

== Notes ==
Political offices
Preceded by George L. Dobson	Secretary of State of Iowa; 1901–1907	Succeeded by William C. Hayward
