= USS Grampus (1863) =

Retired ship in the United States Navy

History

United States
- Acquired: 22 July 1863
- In service: 1863
- Fate: Sold, 1 September 1868

General characteristics
- Displacement: 230 tons
- Length: 180 ft (55 m)
- Beam: 27 ft (8.2 m)
- Draft: 5 ft (1.5 m)
- Armament: none

The second USS Grampus was a side-wheel steamer in the United States Navy. She was named for a member of the dolphin family (Delphinidae): Grampus griseus, also known as Risso's dolphin.

Originally named Ion, she was purchased by Rear Admiral David D. Porter for the U.S. Navy on 22 July 1863, at Cincinnati, Ohio, for US$9750. She was stationed at Cincinnati, Ohio, and used as a receiving ship for the Mississippi Squadron. By 14 November 1863, with Acting Master Elijah Sells in command, she was recognized as a "nice little receiving vessel in first-rate order," but contained no furnishings or weapons other than ten cutlasses and revolvers.

With Acting Ensign C.W. Litherbury in command, Grampus remained at Cincinnati, Ohio, assisting in stripping of ships for conversion to gunboats, and effecting their delivery to fleet staging points for the Mississippi Squadron, principally Cairo, Illinois, and Mound City, Illinois.

Grampus was sold to D.D. Holliday & Brothers on 1 September 1868 at Mound City, Illinois.
