= Ed Wright (politician) =

American politician

Secretary of State of Iowa
- In office 1867–1873
- Governor: William M. Stone; Samuel Merrill; Cyrus C. Carpenter
- Preceded by: James Wright
- Succeeded by: Josiah T. Young

Member of the Iowa House of Representatives
- In office 1858–1862

Personal details
- Born: June 27, 1827
- Died: December 6, 1895 (aged 68)

Ed Wright (June 27, 1827 – December 6, 1895) was an American Union brevet brigadier general during the period of the American Civil War.

Born in Salem, Ohio, Wright went to the public schools. Wright moved to Cedar County, Iowa in 1852 and was a teacher and carpenter. Wrighr served in the Iowa House of Representatives from 1858 to 1862 and from 1866 to 1868. He was a Republican. He was commissioned a major in the 24th Iowa Volunteer Infantry, a group of soldiers that were eventually stationed in Helena, Arkansas. His was later attached to the 13th Corps and fought in the Vicksburg Campaign. During the Battle of Champion Hills, Major Wright was severely wounded at the Battle of Champion Hill. He also served in the Red River Campaign, Sheridan's Shenandoah Campaign, and Savannah, Georgia. He received his appointment as brevet brigadier general dated to March 13, 1865.

In 1866, he was elected Secretary of State of Iowa three times.

Political offices
Preceded by James Wright	Secretary of State of Iowa; 1867–1873	Succeeded by Josiah T. Young
