= Elisha Cutler Jr. =

American politician

Elisha Cutler, Jr. (August 5, 1816 – July 17, 1849) was an American politician.

Born in Boston, Massachusetts, Cutler settled in Van Buren County, Iowa Territory. He served in the first Iowa Constitutional Convention of 1844 and as district court clerk for Van Buren County. From 1846 to 1848, Cutler served as the first Iowa Secretary of State and was a Democrat. Cutler died in Keosauqua, Iowa from cholera.

== Notes ==
Political offices
Preceded by office created	Secretary of State of Iowa; 1846–1848	Succeeded by George W. McCleary
