= G. C. Greenwalt =

American politician and military officer (1889–1979)

Gilbert C. Greenwalt (1889–1979) was an American politician and military officer.

Greenwalt was born in Hastings, Iowa, and attended Simpson College. Following the American entry into World War I, Greenwalt was commissioned into the United States Army as a second lieutenant. Throughout his political career, Greenwalt was affiliated with the Republican Party. Between 1931 and 1933, Greenwalt served as Secretary of State of Iowa. During his first year in office, Greenwalt issued the first driver's licenses in Iowa. He ran for reelection in 1934, losing to Ola Babcock Miller. From 1937, Greenwalt began serving as treasurer of Polk County. The following year, Greenwalt noted that many driver's licenses purchased in December were Christmas gifts. He ran for reelection as in 1940, and served until 1941, when he was commissioned in the Iowa Army National Guard as a lieutenant colonel. J. F. Baillie was appointed by the county board of supervisors to replace Greenwalt. Following World War II, Greenwalt became commanding officer of Jefferson Barracks Military Post, and was succeeded by Malin Craig Jr. before Jefferson Barracks was decommissioned. By 1948, Greenwalt and his wife moved from West Des Moines, Iowa, to Fort Knox, Kentucky. Greenwalt retired from active service in 1955 and moved to Florida. He died in Bradenton on September 28, 1979, and, following services on October 1, was buried in Arlington National Cemetery.
