= John A. Hull =

United States Army general

The Honorable John Adley Hull
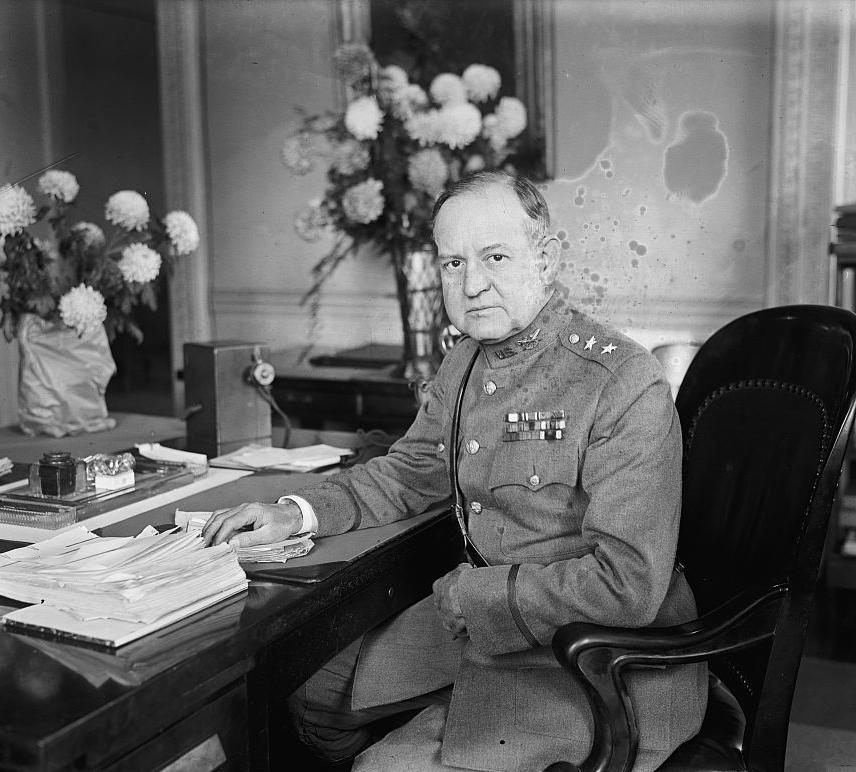
- John A. Hull
- Born: August 7, 1874; Bloomfield, Iowa
- Died: April 17, 1944 (aged 69); Washington, D.C.
- Relatives: John A.T. Hull (father)
- Military career
- Allegiance: United States of America
- Branch: United States Army
- Service years: 1898–1928
- Rank: Major General
- Commands: Judge Advocate General's Corps
- Conflicts: World War I
- Awards: Distinguished Service Medal

John Adley Hull (August 7, 1874 – April 17, 1944) was a Judge Advocate General in the U.S. Army and an associate justice of the Supreme Court of the Philippines.

== Early life and education ==
Hull was born in Bloomfield, Iowa, to Civil War officer and longtime Iowa Congressman John A.T. Hull and his wife, Emma Gregory Hull. He received a law degree from the University of Iowa College of Law.

== Career ==
At the beginning of the Spanish–American War, he enlisted in the Iowa National Guard and was promoted to Lieutenant Colonel and Judge Advocate for the U.S. Volunteers. In 1901, he was appointed a major in the Judge Advocate General's Corps. He would serve as legal advisor to Governor-General of the Philippines Francis Burton Harrison from 1913 to 1921.

In 1924, President Calvin Coolidge nominated him to be judge advocate general of the Army with the rank of major general, a position he held until 1928 when he retired from the Army. In 1927, it was thought he would succeed Leonard Wood as Governor-General of the Philippines, but Coolidge instead chose past and future cabinet member Henry L. Stimson.

In February 1930, Hull served as Chief Legal Advisor to Stimson's successor as Governor General of the Philippines, Dwight F. Davis. He served in that position until 1932, when President Herbert C. Hoover appointed him Associate Justice of the Supreme Court of the Philippines. He resigned from the court on February 1, 1936. Earlier Philippine President Manuel Quezon had ruled that the Court of Appeals Act provided for only Philippine judges.

== Personal life ==
He married Norma Bowler King at Fort Myer, Virginia, in 1919. She would divorce him on May 22, 1934, in Reno, Nevada.

== Death ==
He died at Walter Reed Hospital in Washington, D.C., on April 17, 1944.
