= State Library of Iowa =

Library service of the US state of Iowa

Coordinates: 41.5928°N 93.6027°W

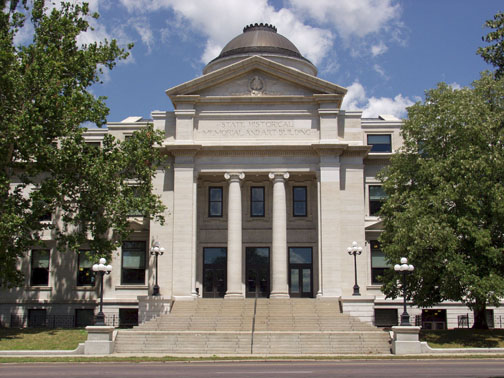
The Ola Babcock Miller Building, built as the Iowa Historical Memorial and Arts Building (Oliver O. Smith, architect, 1910)

The State Library of Iowa is a library service in the U.S. state of Iowa. Founded in around 1840, it is based in Des Moines and is run by the Iowa Department of Education. The State Library supports local libraries in the state and it itself acts as a resource for the state government and its citizens. It is funded from local taxation.

== History ==
The first legislative assembly of the Territory of Iowa convened at Burlington on November 12, 1838. In his first message to this assembly on November 12, 1838, Governor Robert Lucas referred to a library, reporting that prior to leaving Ohio, and with the assistance of several library friends, he had made a catalogue of standard works he deemed as most important as the foundation of a library, and had commissioned an agent in Cincinnati to purchase the books. This having been done and the books expected in a short time, he recommended to the assembly the appointment of a librarian, defining his duties, who should be custodian of the library.

The second legislative assembly of 1840 passed an Act for the appointment of a librarian and defined his duties. The library was open every day during the sessions of the legislature and Supreme Court and for four hours on Wednesday and Saturday afternoons the remainder of the year. The library was moved to the new Capitol in Iowa City in 1857.

In January 1894, the library was moved to its new quarters in the west wing of the new capitol building in Des Moines. The new library was an addition of true architectural beauty to the new capitol. Its four galleries were reached by winding stairs at either end of the room. It was furnished in ash and chestnut, with marble wainscoting and pilasters, and had an encaustic tile floor. This original state library is still occupied by the state law library and its architectural beauty is admired by thousands of tourists each year.

While the legal materials remained in the capitol, in 1857 the rest of the state library’s collections were moved to the west wing of the new State Historical, Memorial and Art Building. The State Library moved to the east wing of the building in 1912 where it remains today. A total renovation of the building meant to bring back the original colors and design features began in 1999 and ended in 2001.

The original mission of the State Library was to provide services to state government. Over the years, this mission grew to include the planning and development of library services on a statewide basis. Today, the State Library, a division of the Iowa Department of Education, offers a multitude of services and programs to the libraries and citizens of Iowa.

== Support for local libraries ==
- Public library standards and accreditation program
- Public library annual survey and statistics
- Ideas for library services and programs for adults
- Resources for implementing a successful library building project
- Resources for providing the best possible library services to children
- Continuing education opportunities in all areas of library service
- Active discounts and pricing specials on products
- Iowa Certification Program for Public Librarians
- Access to FirstSearch and EBSCOhost
- Library directories
- Information for libraries applying for the federal e-rate program
- Program coordinator for the Enrich Iowa Program which includes Direct State Aid (for public libraries), Open Access and Interlibrary Loan Reimbursement
- Information for libraries about grants and other funding sources
- Resources on helping people find, evaluate and use information
- A list of job openings in Iowa libraries
- Resources for libraries helping job seekers
- Resources to help library trustees be effective
- Resources for and about librarians including the value of librarians, pay equity, entering the library profession
- Resources on planning for public libraries
- Sample public library policies
- Training on how to develop a Web site
- help with medical or legal questions
- Public library standards and accreditation program
- Information on the value of school libraries to students
- Public library statistics used to evaluate and enhance library service at the local, state, and national levels
- Resources for providing the best possible library services to teens
- Public relations resources to help libraries tell their stories

== Support for Iowa government and Iowans ==
- A.J. Small Special Collections - Iowa's seminal legal documents
- Iowa Collections - Books and journals with an Iowa connection
- Iowa Publications Online – Digital state documents
- Government and Management Library
- Research library for Iowa state government employees who are seeking information for job related activities. All areas of government operation and related topics are covered including:
  - budgeting
  - organizational management
  - customer service and quality improvement
  - social policy
  - economic issues
  - statistics
  - legislative "hot topics"
  - state and federal income tax forms

The law library provides Iowa lawmakers, government employees, the Iowa legal community and the general public with a highly specialized legal collection of treatises and both state and federal statutory, regulatory and case law. The collection also contains the abstracts and arguments of the Iowa Supreme Court and Court of Appeals, legal periodicals, and materials produced by the Iowa Legislature.

The State Data Center of Iowa is the source for population, housing, business and government statistics about Iowa, including data from the US Census Bureau, Iowa state agencies, and other state and federal sources.

- Databases - Online articles, newspapers, maps, etc. (EBSCOhost and First Search)
- Iowa Inventor's Database 1843-2009
- Digital Sanborn fire insurance maps are a very useful tool for local historians, demographers, city planners, genealogists, and anyone studying the history of an urban area. The maps were developed by the Sanborn Company in the latter part of the 19th century for the purpose of showing fire hazards for each building in a town. Maps cover over 360 Iowa towns from the 1870s to the 1920s.
- Iowa Heritage Digital Collections enables users to explore Iowa history and culture by viewing pictures from the collections of Iowa libraries and museums.
- Iowa Locator helps users to find books in Iowa's libraries.

=== Publications ===
- Footnotes - Quarterly State Library newsletter
- State Library Update - Newsletter for the State Library card holders
- King, Karon S and State Library of Iowa. 2008. State Librarians of Iowa. Des Moines Iowa: Library.

== See also ==
- List of libraries in the United States
