= 1906 Iowa Senate election =

- November 6, 1906

22 out of 50 seats in the Iowa State Senate 26 seats needed for a majority
	Majority party	Minority party
Party	Republican	Democratic
Last election	42	8
Seats after	36	14
Seat change	▼6	▲6
- Results; Democratic gain Republican gain Democratic hold Republican hold

The 1906 Iowa State Senate elections took place as part of the biennial 1906 United States elections. Iowa voters elected state senators in 22 of the state senate's 50 districts. State senators serve four-year terms in the Iowa State Senate.

A statewide map of the 50 state Senate districts in the 1906 elections is provided by the Iowa General Assembly here.

The 1906 elections were the last in Iowa before primary elections were established by the Primary Election Law in 1907. The general election took place on November 6, 1906.

Following the previous election, Republicans had control of the Iowa Senate with 42 seats to Democrats' 8 seats.

To claim control of the chamber from Republicans, the Democrats needed to net 18 Senate seats.

Republicans maintained control of the Iowa State Senate following the 1906 general election with the balance of power shifting to Republicans holding 36 seats and Democrats having 14 seats (a net gain of 6 seats for Democrats).

== Summary of Results ==
- Note: The 28 holdover Senators not up for re-election are not listed on this table.

State Senate District	Incumbent	Party	Elected Senator	Party
1st	David Arthur Young	Dem	Edward Patrick McManus	Dem
4th	Richard Albert Hasselquist	Rep	John Alexander McKlveen	Rep
7th	Lester W. Lewis	Rep	William Darius Jamieson	Dem
9th	Frederick Norton Smith	Dem	Frederick Norton Smith	Dem
10th	John Alex Young	Rep	William Beeler Seeley	Rep
12th	John Tinley Brooks	Rep	Elbert Warren Clark	Rep
13th	Samuel Houston Harper	Rep	Edwin G. Moon	Dem
18th	James E. Bruce	Rep	James E. Bruce	Rep
20th	Fred M. Molsberry	Rep	Jay Ira Nichols	Rep
21st	William C. Hayward	Rep	John A. DeArmand	Dem
22nd	John Lowry Wilson	Dem	John Lowry Wilson	Dem
29th	Frederick Louis Maytag	Rep	Frederick Louis Maytag	Rep
30th	Cassius Clay Dowell	Rep	Cassius Clay Dowell	Rep
34th	Ernest Lincoln Hogue	Rep	William Criner Whiting	Dem
35th	Phineas W. Crawford	Rep	Arfst F. Frudden	Dem
37th	Fred Carlton Hartshorn	Rep	Charles Fremont Peterson	Rep
38th	Orlando Billings Courtright	Rep	Sherman W. DeWolf	Dem
42nd	Dennis Aloysius Lyons	Dem	Henry Clay Burgess	Rep
44th	Edmund Cole Spaulding	Rep	John Foley	Dem
45th	William Perry Whipple	Rep	William Perry Whipple	Rep
48th	Warren Garst	Rep	Joseph Mattes	Rep
50th	Edward King Winne	Rep	Joseph Holmes Allen	Rep

== Detailed Results ==
- NOTE: The 28 districts that did not hold elections in 1906 are not listed here.

=== District 1 ===
Iowa Senate, District 1 General Election, 1906
Party	Candidate	Votes	%
Democratic	E. P. McManus	3,977	51.60%
Republican	Joseph Fry	3,588	46.55%
Independent	George P. Neal	143	1.86%
Total votes		7,708	100.00%
Democratic hold			

=== District 4 ===
- To fill vacancy caused by resignation of R. A. Hasselquist, who was elected for full term in 1903.

Iowa Senate, District 4 General Election, 1906
Party	Candidate	Votes	%
Republican	J. A. McKlveen	3,202	50.25%
Democratic	Hardin L. Exley	3,170	49.75%
Total votes		6,372	100.00%
Republican hold			

=== District 7 ===
Iowa Senate, District 7 General Election, 1906
Party	Candidate	Votes	%
Democratic	William Darius Jamieson	3,803	51.80%
Republican	William S. Farquhar	3,539	48.20%
Total votes		7,342	100.00%
Democratic gain from Republican			

=== District 9 ===
Iowa Senate, District 9 General Election, 1906
Party	Candidate	Votes	%
Democratic	Fred N. Smith (incumbent)	3,777	52.34%
Republican	Frank Canny	3,439	47.66%
Total votes		7,216	100.00%
Democratic hold			

=== District 10 ===
Iowa Senate, District 10 General Election, 1906
Party	Candidate	Votes	%
Republican	William B. Seeley	4,808	61.63%
Democratic	Edward Deeds	2,993	38.37%
Total votes		7,801	100.00%
Republican hold			

=== District 12 ===
Iowa Senate, District 12 General Election, 1906
Party	Candidate	Votes	%
Republican	E. W. Clark	4,721	53.07%
Democratic	J. H. Platt	4,174	46.93%
Total votes		8,895	100.00%
Republican hold			

=== District 13 ===
Iowa Senate, District 13 General Election, 1906
Party	Candidate	Votes	%
Democratic	Edwin G. Moon	3,824	49.71%
Republican	S. H. Harper (incumbent)	3,516	45.70%
Socialist	O. C. Graves	353	4.59%
Total votes		7,693	100.00%
Democratic gain from Republican			

=== District 18 ===
Iowa Senate, District 18 General Election, 1906
Party	Candidate	Votes	%
Republican	James E. Bruce (incumbent)	3,792	51.98%
Democratic	J. M. Emmert	3,503	48.02%
Total votes		7,295	100.00%
Republican hold			

=== District 20 ===
Iowa Senate, District 20 General Election, 1906
Party	Candidate	Votes	%
Republican	J. I. Nichols	4,653	54.36%
Democratic	E. M. Warner	3,602	42.08%
Socialist	Lee W. Lang	304	3.55%
Total votes		8,559	100.00%
Republican hold			

=== District 21 ===
Iowa Senate, District 21 General Election, 1906
Party	Candidate	Votes	%
Democratic	J. A. DeArmand	5,172	47.30%
Republican	W. M. Chamberlin	4,999	45.72%
Socialist	Nels P. Alifas	698	6.38%
Prohibition	J. E. Park	66	0.60%
Total votes		10,935	100.00%
Democratic gain from Republican			

=== District 22 ===
Iowa Senate, District 22 General Election, 1906
Party	Candidate	Votes	%
Democratic	John L. Wilson (incumbent)	4,462	55.28%
Republican	Charles Gottlob	3,441	42.63%
Socialist	E. C. Bremer	169	2.09%
Total votes		8,072	100.00%
Democratic hold			

=== District 29 ===
Iowa Senate, District 29 General Election, 1906
Party	Candidate	Votes	%
Republican	Fred L. Maytag (incumbent)	3,160	63.56%
Independent	Perry Engle	1,590	31.98%
Socialist	M. W. Shaw	222	4.47%
Total votes		4,972	100.00%
Republican hold			

=== District 30 ===
Iowa Senate, District 30 General Election, 1906
Party	Candidate	Votes	%
Republican	C. C. Dowell (incumbent)	8,375	64.02%
Democratic	Walt H. Butler	3,744	28.62%
Socialist	George A. Turbett	625	4.78%
Prohibition	William Thornton	338	2.58%
Total votes		13,082	100.00%
Republican hold			

=== District 34 ===
Iowa Senate, District 34 General Election, 1906
Party	Candidate	Votes	%
Democratic	Will C. Whiting	5,967	50.69%
Republican	P. D. McMahon	5,804	49.31%
Total votes		11,771	100.00%
Democratic gain from Republican			

=== District 35 ===
Iowa Senate, District 35 General Election, 1906
Party	Candidate	Votes	%
Democratic	A. F. Frudden	4,982	50.88%
Republican	P. W. Crawford (incumbent)	4,468	45.63%
Socialist	Alexander McAleece	342	3.49%
Total votes		9,792	100.00%
Democratic gain from Republican			

=== District 37 ===
Iowa Senate, District 37 General Election, 1906
Party	Candidate	Votes	%
Republican	Charles F. Peterson	6,252	73.42%
Democratic	N. L. Rood	2,263	26.58%
Total votes		8,515	100.00%
Republican hold			

=== District 38 ===
Iowa Senate, District 38 General Election, 1906
Party	Candidate	Votes	%
Democratic	Sherman W. DeWolf	4,550	48.60%
Republican	Alfred Longley	4,371	46.69%
Socialist	Earl Mayer	241	2.57%
Prohibition	Schuyler D. Mitchell	200	2.14%
Total votes		9,362	100.00%
Democratic gain from Republican			

=== District 42 ===
Iowa Senate, District 42 General Election, 1906
Party	Candidate	Votes	%
Republican	Henry C. Burgess	4,208	59.37%
Democratic	Anthony Bernatz	2,804	39.56%
Socialist	P. A. Wanless	76	1.07%
Total votes		7,088	100.00%
Republican gain from Democratic			

=== District 44 ===
Iowa Senate, District 44 General Election, 1906
Party	Candidate	Votes	%
Democratic	John Foley	2,864	43.35%
Republican	F. O. Martin	2,774	41.99%
Independent	B. F. Wright	968	14.65%
Total votes		6,606	100.00%
Democratic gain from Republican			

=== District 45 ===
Iowa Senate, District 45 General Election, 1906
Party	Candidate	Votes	%
Republican	W. P. Whipple (incumbent)	5,380	52.85%
Democratic	W. J. Gwinn	4,799	47.15%
Total votes		10,179	100.00%
Republican hold			

=== District 48 ===
Iowa Senate, District 48 General Election, 1906
Party	Candidate	Votes	%
Republican	Joseph Mattes	5,527	56.50%
Democratic	C. E. Reynolds	4,256	43.50%
Total votes		9,783	100.00%
Republican hold			

=== District 50 ===
Iowa Senate, District 50 General Election, 1906
Party	Candidate	Votes	%
Republican	Joseph H. Allen	4,597	65.98%
Democratic	D. A. Ray	2,370	34.02%
Total votes		6,967	100.00%
Republican hold			

== See also ==
- United States elections, 1906
- United States House of Representatives elections in Iowa, 1906
- Elections in Iowa
