= George L. Dobson =

American lawyer and politician

George L. Dobson (September 24, 1851 – February 16, 1919) was an American lawyer and politician.

Born in Westmorland, England, Dobson emigrated with his parents to the United States in 1864. He moved to Iowa and settled in Sac City, Iowa. In 1878, Dobson graduated from University of Iowa and was admitted to the Iowa bar. He practiced law in Newell, Buena Vista County, Iowa. He served as mayor of Newell, Iowa and on the Newell School Board. Dobson served in the Iowa House of Representatives from 1886 to 1892 and was a Republican. He then served as Iowa Secretary of State from 1897 to 1901. He served county treasurer for Polk County, Iowa. Dobson served as United States consul at Hang Chow in 1905 and 1906. He also served as register of the United States Land Office in Beaver, Oklahoma. Dobson died at his son's home in Redmond, Oregon.

== Notes ==
Political offices
Preceded by William M. McFarland	Secretary of State of Iowa; 1897–1901	Succeeded by William B. Martin
