= John A. T. Hull =

American politician (1841–1928)

John Albert Tiffin Hull
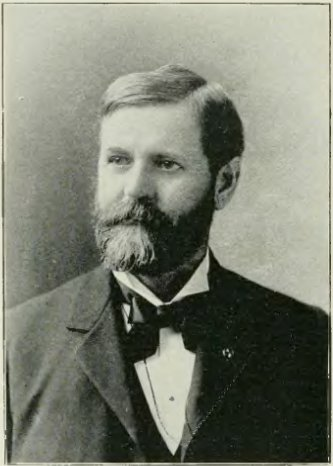

Member of the U.S. House of Representatives from Iowa's 7th district
- In office March 4, 1891 – March 3, 1911
- Preceded by: Edward R. Hays
- Succeeded by: Solomon F. Prouty

13th Lieutenant Governor of Iowa
- In office 1886–1890
- Governor: William Larrabee
- Preceded by: Orlando H. Manning
- Succeeded by: Alfred N. Poyneer

8th Secretary of State of Iowa
- In office 1879–1885
- Governor: John H. Gear; Buren R. Sherman
- Preceded by: Josiah T. Young
- Succeeded by: Frank D. Jackson

Personal details
- Born: May 1, 1841 Sabina, Ohio, U.S.
- Died: September 26, 1928 (aged 87) Clarendon, Virginia, U.S.
- Resting place: Arlington National Cemetery
- Party: Republican
- Children: John A. Hull
- Education: University of Cincinnati

Military service
- Branch/service: Union Army
- Years of service: July 1862–October 1863
- Rank: Captain
- Unit: 23rd Iowa Infantry Regiment
- Battles/wars: Civil War

John Albert Tiffin Hull (May 1, 1841 – September 26, 1928) was a ten-term Republican U.S. representative from Iowa's 7th congressional district. He had earlier served two terms as the Lieutenant Governor of Iowa and three terms as Iowa Secretary of State.

== Biography ==
Born in Sabina, Ohio, Hull moved with his parents to Iowa in 1849. He attended public schools, Indiana Asbury (now De Pauw) University in Greencastle, Indiana, and Iowa Wesleyan College in Mount Pleasant, Iowa. He graduated from the Cincinnati Law School in the spring of 1862, was admitted to the bar the same year, and commenced practice in Des Moines, Iowa.

In July 1862, during the Civil War, he enlisted in the Twenty-third Regiment of the Iowa Volunteer Infantry. Serving as a first lieutenant and captain, he was "wounded in the charge on intrenchments at Black River May 17, 1863", resigning due to wounds in October 1863.

Hull engaged in agricultural pursuits and banking.

He was elected Secretary of the Iowa Senate in 1872, then reelected in 1874, 1876, and 1878. He was elected Iowa Secretary of State in 1878 (and reelected in 1880 and 1882). He was then elected Lieutenant Governor in 1885 (and reelected in 1887).

In 1890, Hull was elected as a Republican to the U.S. House seat for Iowa's 7th congressional district, which included Iowa's largest city (Des Moines). The Fifty-second Congress was unusual for its era, because, for the first time since the Civil War, Iowans had elected more Democrats than Republicans to the U.S. House. Two years, later, however, there was a Republican resurgence in Iowa, commencing a two-decade era in which Republicans held at least ten of Iowa's eleven House seats. During that era, Hull was re-elected nine times. He served as chairman of the House Committee on Military Affairs from the Fifty-fourth through Sixty-first Congresses. He was considered a "standpatter," and a lieutenant of controversial House Speaker "Uncle Joe" Cannon.

In 1910, U.S. Senator Albert B. Cummins, the leader of the Iowa Republican Party's progressive wing, targeted Hull for defeat, by giving his early endorsement to a progressive adversary, Solomon F. Prouty, whom Hull had defeated in three earlier contests for Republican renomination. This time, Prouty defeated Hull in the Republican primary, carrying every county. However, two voters wrote in Hull's name for the Prohibition Party nomination, enough to give Hull that party's nomination. Nevertheless, Prouty went on to win the general election. In all, Hull served in Congress from March 4, 1891, to March 3, 1911.

After leaving Congress, Hull resumed the practice of law, this time in Washington, D.C. He retired in 1916, died in Clarendon, Virginia on September 26, 1928, and was interred in Arlington National Cemetery.

His son, Major General John A. Hull, served as Judge Advocate General (1924–1928) and later as Associate Justice of the Supreme Court of the Philippines (1932–1936).

Political offices
Preceded by Josiah T. Young	Secretary of State of Iowa; 1879–1885	Succeeded by Frank D. Jackson
Preceded by Orlando H. Manning	Lieutenant Governor of Iowa; 1886–1890	Succeeded by Alfred N. Poyneer
U.S. House of Representatives
Preceded by Edward R. Hays	Member of the U.S. House of Representatives from Iowa's 7th congressional district March 4, 1891 – March 3, 1911 (obsolete district)	Succeeded by Solomon F. Prouty
