= Ola Babcock Miller =

Iowa Secretary of State (1871–1937)

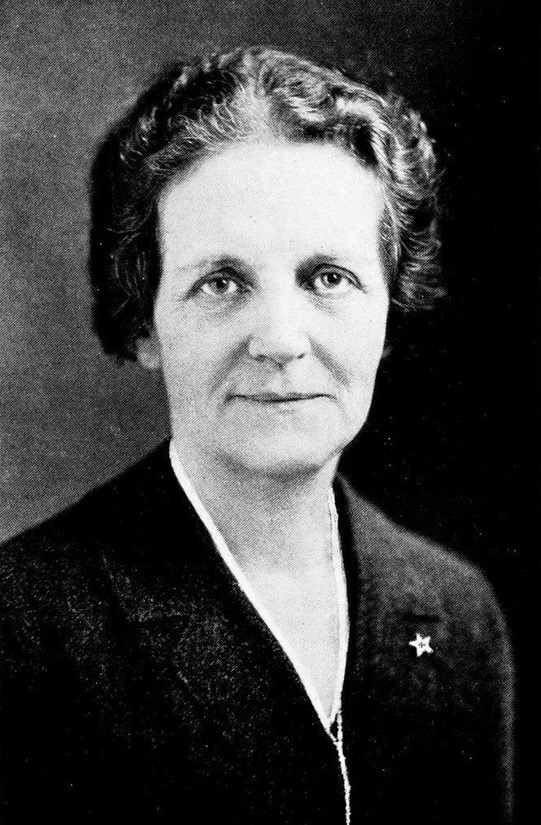

18th Secretary of State of Iowa
- In office 1933–1937
- Governor: Clyde L. Herring
- Preceded by: G. C. Greenwalt
- Succeeded by: Robert F. O'Brien

Personal details
- Born: March 1, 1871 rural Washington, Iowa
- Died: January 5, 1937 (aged 65) Des Moines, Iowa
- Party: Democratic
- Spouse: Alex Miller
- Children: 1
- Education: Iowa Wesleyan College
- Profession: Teacher

Eunice Viola "Ola" Babcock Miller (March 1, 1871 – January 25, 1937) was an American politician and the first female Iowa Secretary of State.

Born in Washington County, Iowa, Miller and her family moved to Washington, Iowa. She went to Iowa Wesleyan College. She taught in rural schools and then married Alex Miller. Their daughter Ophelia (died in 1988) married George Gallup who started the Gallup Poll.

"[W]hen Gallup was a professor of Journalism at Northwestern University, his mother-in-law Ola Babcock Miller ran for Lieutenant Governor of Iowa. Her husband had died in office and the nomination was largely honorary and she was not expected to win. Gallup decided to apply his ideas about measuring reader interest to understanding her chances."

Contrary to the above quote, Miller's election was to the office of Secretary of State. Predicting her victory against the odds was Gallup's start in election polling.

Miller was elected Iowa Secretary of State in 1932 as a Democrat. While secretary of state in 1935, Miller started the Iowa Highway Safety Patrol. Miller died in 1937 of pneumonia in Des Moines, Iowa.

== Notes ==
Political offices
Preceded by G. C. Greenwalt	Secretary of State of Iowa; 1933–1937	Succeeded by Robert E. O'Brien
