= Canby, Minnesota =

City in Minnesota, United States

Canby
- City
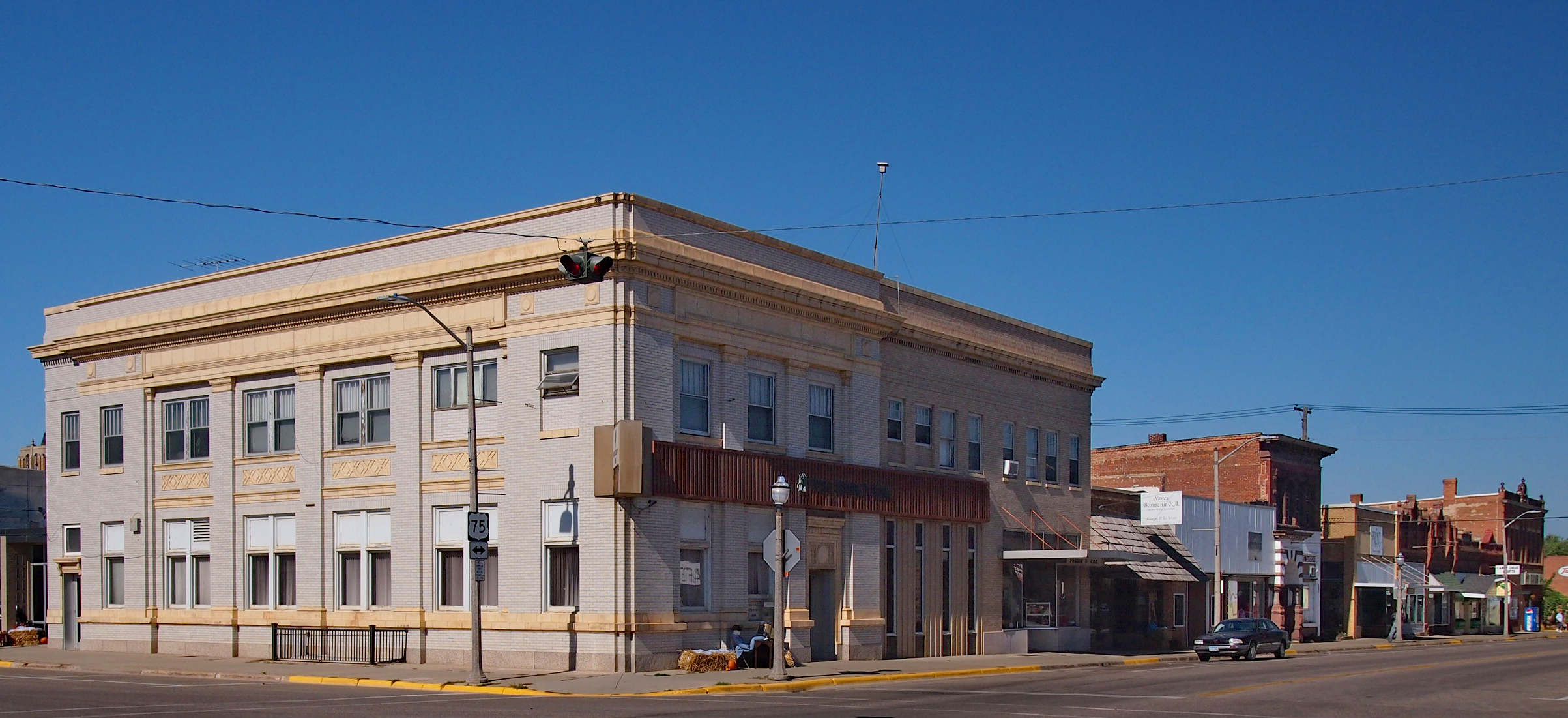
- Canby's historic downtown
- Motto: "Gateway to the Prairie"
- Location of Canby within Yellow Medicine County, Minnesota
- Coordinates: 44°42′57″N 96°16′09″W
- Country: United States
- State: Minnesota
- County: Yellow Medicine

Area
  - Total: 2.25 sq mi (5.82 km^{2})
  - Land: 2.24 sq mi (5.80 km^{2})
  - Water: 0.0077 sq mi (0.02 km^{2})
- Elevation: 1,214 ft (370 m)

Population (2020)
  - Total: 1,695
  - Density: 757.1/sq mi (292.33/km^{2})
- Time zone: UTC-6 (Central (CST))
  - Summer (DST): UTC-5 (CDT)
- ZIP code: 56220
- Area code: 507
- FIPS code: 27-09604
- GNIS feature ID: 2393728
- Website: https://canbymn.gov/

Canby is a city in Yellow Medicine County, Minnesota, United States. The population was 1,695 at the 2020 census.

== History ==
John Swenson, who secured a homestead on section 4 of Norman Township where now stands the City of Canby, was one of the early European settlers in the area. After erecting a claim shanty, for the convenience of his neighbors, he opened a little store in his cabin. In November 1874, he secured the establishment of a post office in that store. At Swenson's suggestion, the post office was named Canby, in honor of Civil War and career officer General Edward Canby of the United States Army. (General Canby had been assassinated the prior year during peace negotiations with the Modoc Tribe of Northern California.)

However, in 1876 the surrounding country was receiving new settlers and the railway company deemed it time to begin the operation of train service over the western part of the line. Canby Station was established and on August 24, 1876, and the city platted by the Winona & St. Peter Railroad Company soon after the railroad was extended to that point. Because of its location on the rail line, Canby grew quickly and was incorporated as a village in 1879 and as a city in 1905.

Lots were sold by the railroad with the provision that they must be built upon within six months. Swenson was the first to buy, and he selected the corner of Front and Main for his first store building.

Grasshoppers, natives, and prairie fires were a big concern for Canby residents at this time. 1875 was the summer of the first bad grasshopper plague. The settlers tried everything they could think of to make them go away but the grasshoppers devoured every blade of grass, the leaves on the trees and even clustered on buildings.

Natives were on everyone's mind because of General Custer's campaign in Wyoming. On June 25, 1876, 3,000 braves circled and killed Custer and his 277 troops. Not long after the battle, a band of about 100 natives camped along the railroad track in Canby to trade furs for merchandise. The group soon left without incident.

Firebreaks were plowed around the town and each farmstead because settlers were ever alert to prairie fires. In 1893 it wasn't a prairie fire but a common daily task that started a fire in town. It began with filling a kerosene lamp from a tin measure. Fate and the wind were against Canby that night. After the flames had demolished every Main street store between the Swenson building and the bank, the wind switched and blew the heat and sparks across Main street to Block 3 where every structure went except for one.

A loss of $150,000 was reported but Canby built right up again and the structures were replaced with brick or stone construction. Because of the uniquely preserved architecture of these buildings the downtown area has been designated as a nationally registered historic district. The corner piece of this district as well as the oldest building, which was not destroyed in the fire, is located on the corner of Highway 75 and 2nd Street.

The first sermon was preached in Canby in 1876, however, in 1879 the first regular religious service in the English language was held. The first school was started in 1877 and located on the second floor of a home. The Canby News was founded in September 1878; it was the westernmost newspaper on the railroad. The cost of Canby's government in 1888-1889 was $5,898.12.

The new century saw a lot of change in Canby and all over the world. Businesses changed hands and many new ones were established. It was a time of amazing growth in Canby. In 1915, 50 new homes were built. It was a pre-war boom. Post-war also saw a lot of changes. In 1930 motorized power and electrical power were taking place. A count of businesses in 1940 found 157 business places in Canby.

In 1946, after World War II, there was again a shortage of housing in Canby. In 1947, 55 building permits were issued. The following years were all “building years” and showed a lot of growth for Canby.

The population of Canby showed its largest growth in the 1930s and reached its peak in 1950.

Farmers have cultivated the area around Canby since the first settlers arrived in the middle of the 19th century. Farms and agriculture related businesses – both large and small, provide opportunities for various types of employment. Canby, realizing the importance of “farming,” continues to create new ways to promote the area's farming industry to insure the community's sustainability in the future.

== Geography ==
Canby is located mainly in Sections 3 & 4 of Norman Township (T114N R45W). According to the United States Census Bureau, the city has a total area of 2.20 square miles (5.70 km^{2}); 2.19 square miles (5.67 km^{2}) is land and 0.01 square miles (0.03 km^{2}) is water.

Canby Creek, a tributary of the Lac qui Parle River, flows through the city.

U.S. Highway 75 and Minnesota State Highway 68 are two of the main routes in the city. Minnesota State Highway 67 is in close proximity to the city.

=== Climate ===
Climate data for Canby, Minnesota, 1991–2020 normals, extremes 1916–present
Month	Jan	Feb	Mar	Apr	May	Jun	Jul	Aug	Sep	Oct	Nov	Dec	Year
Record high °F (°C)	68 (20)	67 (19)	84 (29)	98 (37)	100 (38)	110 (43)	111 (44)	108 (42)	106 (41)	94 (34)	82 (28)	72 (22)	111 (44)
Mean maximum °F (°C)	46.5 (8.1)	51.3 (10.7)	66.7 (19.3)	81.1 (27.3)	89.4 (31.9)	93.3 (34.1)	95.1 (35.1)	94.0 (34.4)	89.6 (32.0)	83.5 (28.6)	66.0 (18.9)	50.0 (10.0)	97.3 (36.3)
Mean daily maximum °F (°C)	23.4 (−4.8)	27.8 (−2.3)	39.6 (4.2)	54.6 (12.6)	68.1 (20.1)	78.3 (25.7)	83.0 (28.3)	80.7 (27.1)	73.2 (22.9)	58.7 (14.8)	42.0 (5.6)	28.5 (−1.9)	54.8 (12.7)
Daily mean °F (°C)	14.4 (−9.8)	18.6 (−7.4)	30.3 (−0.9)	44.0 (6.7)	57.2 (14.0)	67.7 (19.8)	72.3 (22.4)	69.8 (21.0)	61.6 (16.4)	47.7 (8.7)	32.9 (0.5)	20.3 (−6.5)	44.7 (7.1)
Mean daily minimum °F (°C)	5.4 (−14.8)	9.4 (−12.6)	21.0 (−6.1)	33.3 (0.7)	46.2 (7.9)	57.1 (13.9)	61.5 (16.4)	58.9 (14.9)	50.0 (10.0)	36.8 (2.7)	23.8 (−4.6)	12.0 (−11.1)	34.6 (1.4)
Mean minimum °F (°C)	−16.3 (−26.8)	−11.4 (−24.1)	−1.5 (−18.6)	18.5 (−7.5)	31.5 (−0.3)	44.4 (6.9)	50.1 (10.1)	47.7 (8.7)	34.5 (1.4)	21.3 (−5.9)	4.9 (−15.1)	−9.6 (−23.1)	−19.1 (−28.4)
Record low °F (°C)	−33 (−36)	−32 (−36)	−28 (−33)	0 (−18)	18 (−8)	33 (1)	38 (3)	35 (2)	22 (−6)	9 (−13)	−16 (−27)	−28 (−33)	−33 (−36)
Average precipitation inches (mm)	0.84 (21)	0.90 (23)	1.52 (39)	2.80 (71)	3.43 (87)	4.11 (104)	3.33 (85)	3.35 (85)	2.80 (71)	2.41 (61)	1.35 (34)	1.11 (28)	27.95 (709)
Average snowfall inches (cm)	7.8 (20)	8.0 (20)	7.4 (19)	7.2 (18)	0.1 (0.25)	0.0 (0.0)	0.0 (0.0)	0.0 (0.0)	0.0 (0.0)	1.0 (2.5)	6.4 (16)	9.9 (25)	47.8 (120.75)
Average extreme snow depth inches (cm)	9.4 (24)	10.6 (27)	10.8 (27)	4.7 (12)	0.1 (0.25)	0.0 (0.0)	0.0 (0.0)	0.0 (0.0)	0.0 (0.0)	0.4 (1.0)	4.4 (11)	8.4 (21)	15.6 (40)
Average precipitation days (≥ 0.01 in)	6.0	5.7	6.4	8.5	11.0	10.9	8.5	8.4	7.8	7.6	4.6	6.0	91.4
Average snowy days (≥ 0.1 in)	5.0	4.6	3.3	1.9	0.0	0.0	0.0	0.0	0.0	0.5	2.2	4.9	22.4
Source 1: NOAA
Source 2: National Weather Service

== Demographics ==
Historical population
Census	Pop.	Note	%±
1880	331		—
1890	470		42.0%
1900	1,100		134.0%
1910	1,528		38.9%
1920	1,754		14.8%
1930	1,738		−0.9%
1940	2,099		20.8%
1950	2,173		3.5%
1960	2,146		−1.2%
1970	2,147		0.0%
1980	2,143		−0.2%
1990	1,826		−14.8%
2000	1,903		4.2%
2010	1,795		−5.7%
2020	1,695		−5.6%
U.S. Decennial Census

=== 2020 census ===
As of the 2020 census, Canby had a population of 1,695. The median age was 41.8 years. 23.5% of residents were under the age of 18 and 25.2% of residents were 65 years of age or older. For every 100 females there were 93.3 males, and for every 100 females age 18 and over there were 96.5 males age 18 and over.

0.0% of residents lived in urban areas, while 100.0% lived in rural areas.

There were 766 households in Canby, of which 24.2% had children under the age of 18 living in them. Of all households, 45.7% were married-couple households, 19.6% were households with a male householder and no spouse or partner present, and 29.2% were households with a female householder and no spouse or partner present. About 38.4% of all households were made up of individuals and 20.8% had someone living alone who was 65 years of age or older.

There were 865 housing units, of which 11.4% were vacant. The homeowner vacancy rate was 1.5% and the rental vacancy rate was 15.4%.

Racial composition as of the 2020 census
Race	Number	Percent
White	1,611	95.0%
Black or African American	4	0.2%
American Indian and Alaska Native	4	0.2%
Asian	2	0.1%
Native Hawaiian and Other Pacific Islander	0	0.0%
Some other race	19	1.1%
Two or more races	55	3.2%
Hispanic or Latino (of any race)	77	4.5%

=== 2010 census ===
As of the census of 2010, there were 1,795 people, 792 households, and 441 families living in the city. The population density was 819.6 inhabitants per square mile (316.4/km^{2}). There were 892 housing units at an average density of 407.3 per square mile (157.3/km^{2}). The racial makeup of the city was 97.9% White, 0.3% African American, 0.1% Native American, 0.3% Asian, 0.8% from other races, and 0.7% from two or more races. Hispanic or Latino of any race were 2.4% of the population.

There were 792 households, of which 24.6% had children under the age of 18 living with them, 46.6% were married couples living together, 6.9% had a female householder with no husband present, 2.1% had a male householder with no wife present, and 44.3% were non-families. 39.6% of all households were made up of individuals, and 23.3% had someone living alone who was 65 years of age or older. The average household size was 2.11 and the average family size was 2.81.

The median age in the city was 46.1 years. 19.6% of residents were under the age of 18; 9.3% were between the ages of 18 and 24; 19.8% were from 25 to 44; 23.1% were from 45 to 64; and 28.2% were 65 years of age or older. The gender makeup of the city was 47.9% male and 52.1% female.

=== 2000 census ===
As of the census of 2000, there were 1,903 people, 842 households, and 453 families living in the city. The population density was 876.5 inhabitants per square mile (338.4/km^{2}). There were 918 housing units at an average density of 422.8 per square mile (163.2/km^{2}). The racial makeup of the city was 98.48% White; 0.21% African American; 0.42% Native American; 0.16% Asian; 0.32% from other races, and 0.42% from two or more races. 0.84% of the population were Hispanic or Latino of any race.

There were 842 households, of which 22.9% had children under the age of 18 living with them, 45.2% were married couples living together, 6.8% had a female householder with no husband present, and 46.1% were non-families. 41.7% of all households were made up of individuals, and 23.6% had someone living alone who was 65 years of age or older. The average household size was 2.08 and the average family size was 2.88.

In the city, the population was spread out, with 20.7% under the age of 18; 9.0% from 18 to 24; 19.5% from 25 to 44; 19.9% from 45 to 64; and 30.8% who were 65 years of age or older. The median age was 45 years. For every 100 females, there were 89.7 males. For every 100 females age 18 and over, there were 81.7 males.

The median income for a household in the city was $27,533, and the median income for a family was $38,674. Males had a median income of $25,952 versus $20,282 for females. The per capita income for the city was $16,269. 13.5% of the population and 6.9% of families were below the poverty line. Of the total population, 12.7% of those under the age of 18 and 15.0% of those 65 and older were living below the poverty line.

== Culture ==
Canby is also well known for high school wrestling. Canby High School won the Minnesota State Team Championship in 1976, 1977, 1979, 1986, 1988, 1994, 1995, 2006.

Canby is the home of the Yellow Medicine County Fair which is held annually at the end of Summer. The fair has been held consecutively for over 120 years with the exception of 1954 when the fair was cancelled due to a polio outbreak and 2020 due to the COVID-19 pandemic.

== Notable people ==
- Burnett Bergeson, Minnesota state representative and farmer
- Jerome Clark, folk songwriter and ufologist
- Randy P. Kamrath, Minnesota state representative and farmer
- Layton Kor, pioneer of rock climbing
- Connie Ruth, Minnesota state representative
- Lee Savold, heavyweight boxing contender
