= Connie Ruth =

American politician

Connie Ruth (born 1944) was an American politician.

Ruth was born in Canby, Yellow Medicine County, Minnesota, was raised on a farm, and went to Canby High School. She graduated from Concordia University, Saint Paul, Minnesota, with her bachelor's and master's degrees in organizational management and communications. Ruth lived with her husband and family in Owatonna, Minnesota. Ruth served in the Minnesota House of Representatives from 2001 to 2008 as a Republican.
