= George W. McCleary =

American politician

George W. McCleary (February 28, 1807 – February 1, 1873) was an American politician.

Born in Ohio, McCleary settled in Wapello, Louisa County, Iowa Territory in 1839. McCleary served in the Iowa Territorial House of Representatives from 1843 to 1845 and was a Democrat. He served as speaker of the Iowa Territorial House of Representatives. In 1850, McCleary moved to Iowa City, Iowa. From 1850 to 1856, McCleary served as Iowa Secretary of State. He then served as county judge for Johnson County, Iowa and as mayor for Iowa City. He died from a stroke in Iowa City, Iowa.

== Notes ==
Political offices
Preceded by Josiah H. Bonney	Secretary of State of Iowa; 1850–1856	Succeeded by Elijah Sells
