= Rollo H. Bergeson =

American politician

Rollo Bergeson

22nd Secretary of State of Iowa
- In office 1947–1949
- Governor: Robert D. Blue
- Preceded by: Wayne M. Ropes
- Succeeded by: Melvin D. Synhorst

Personal details
- Born: February 23, 1911 Sioux City, Iowa, U.S.
- Died: April 6, 1993 (aged 82) Nevada, Iowa, U.S.
- Political party: Republican
- Children: 2
- Education: University of South Dakota (BA); Drake University (LLB)

Military service
- Branch/service: United States Navy
- Unit: Naval Air Transport Service
- Battles/wars: World War II

Rollo H. Bergeson (February 23, 1911 – April 6, 1993) was an American attorney and government official who served as the 22nd secretary of state of Iowa from 1947 to 1949.

== Early life and education ==
Bergeson was born in Sioux City, Iowa. His grandfather, Lars Uhr Bergeson, immigrated to the United States from Norway and later became a co-founder of the Republican Party of Iowa. Bergenson had seven siblings, including Emlin L. Bergeson, who served as a member of the Iowa House of Representatives. Bergenson earned a Bachelor of Arts degree from the University of South Dakota in 1932 and a Bachelor of Laws from the Drake University Law School in 1935.

== Career ==
After graduating from law school, Bergeson practiced law in Sioux City from 1935 to 1939. He later enlisted in the United States Navy at the start of World War II. During the war, Bergeson attended the U.S. Army School of Military Government at the University of Virginia and the Civil Affairs Training School at Stanford University. He was also assigned to the Naval Air Transport Service. After the war, Bergeson served as the 22nd secretary of state of Iowa from 1947 to 1949.

== Personal life ==
Bergeson and his wife, Mary Cremin, had two children. He died in Nevada, Iowa in 1993.
