= Mary Jane Odell =

American journalist, lecturer, and politician

- Born: July 28, 1923. Algona, Iowa, U.S.
- Died: December 16, 2010 (aged 87)
- Occupations: Journalist, lecturer, and politician
- Known for: Inducted into the Iowa Women's Hall of Fame

Mary Jane Neville Odell (July 28, 1923 – December 16, 2010) was an American journalist, lecturer, and politician. She received multiple awards during her life, and was inducted into the Iowa Women's Hall of Fame in 1979. In 1980, Odell was appointed Iowa Secretary of State, a position that she held until 1987.

== Early life ==
Odell was born in Algona, Iowa, on July 28, 1923, to Eugene and Madge Lewis Neville. She had two brothers, Lewis and Dan.

Odell married Gerald Chinn in 1946. Their son Brad was born on June 30, 1948, and a daughter Chris was born December 1949.

Odell attended Algona High School, where she took part in mixed chorus, glee club, girls' sextet, and cheerleading. She graduated as valedictorian of her class in 1941. She then attended the University of Iowa. While attending university, she was on the University Student Council, the Board of Publications, and the Currier Hall Council. Odell was also a part of Phi Beta Kappa, Zeta Phi Eta, the National Inter-American Affairs Speaking Contest, and the chorus.

== Career ==
After completing college, Odell became a broadcaster, writer, and continuity director for Des Moines radio station KCBC. During this time, she wrote a column that was published weekly for the Plaintalk newspaper, titled "On the Air". She worked for KRNT radio and television from 1955 to 1967 where she was in half-hour daily television programs, Friday morning shows, and two morning radio shows. Odell founded the Iowa Chapter of American Women in Radio and Television, in which she was the National Area Membership Chairman and Vice-President.

After moving to Chicago, she hosted shows on WSNS-TV and WFLD-TV while also hosting a Town Meeting series. She taught a communications class at Roosevelt University. In 1972 and 1975, Odell received an Emmy Award for outstanding individual achievement. After moving back to Iowa in 1975, she later became the only woman to receive the Hancher-Finkbine Leadership Award from the University of Iowa in 1976. She was a student lecturer on television in Mount Pleasant, Cedar Rapids, Des Moines, and Iowa City. In August 1979, Odell was inducted into the Iowa Women's Hall of Fame. She hosted a variety show in Des Moines, Iowa, for 30 years. Odell interviewed many political figures, actors, authors, musicians, and television stars, including Eleanor Roosevelt, Johnny Carson, and Natalie Wood, while on television.

In 1980, Odell was appointed Secretary of State of Iowa. She was then elected to the office in 1982, serving until 1987. Odell was a Republican. She received an honorary doctorate in 1982. In 1988, she received a H.R. Gross Award for Lifetime Contributions to Broadcasting and Public Service.

== Later life ==
Odell became a widow in 1966 and she married John Odell in June 1967, later moving to Chicago with him, her two children, and his four children.

She died on December 16, 2010, at 87 years old.

Party political offices
Preceded by Melvin D. Synhorst	Republican nominee for Secretary of State of Iowa; 1982	Succeeded by Dawn Roberts
