= Secretary of State of Iowa =

Commissioner of elections of the U.S. state of Iowa

- Incumbent; Paul Pate since 2015
- Type: Secretary of State
- Term length: 4 years
- Formation: 1846
- First holder: Elisha Cutler Jr.
- Website: Official Site

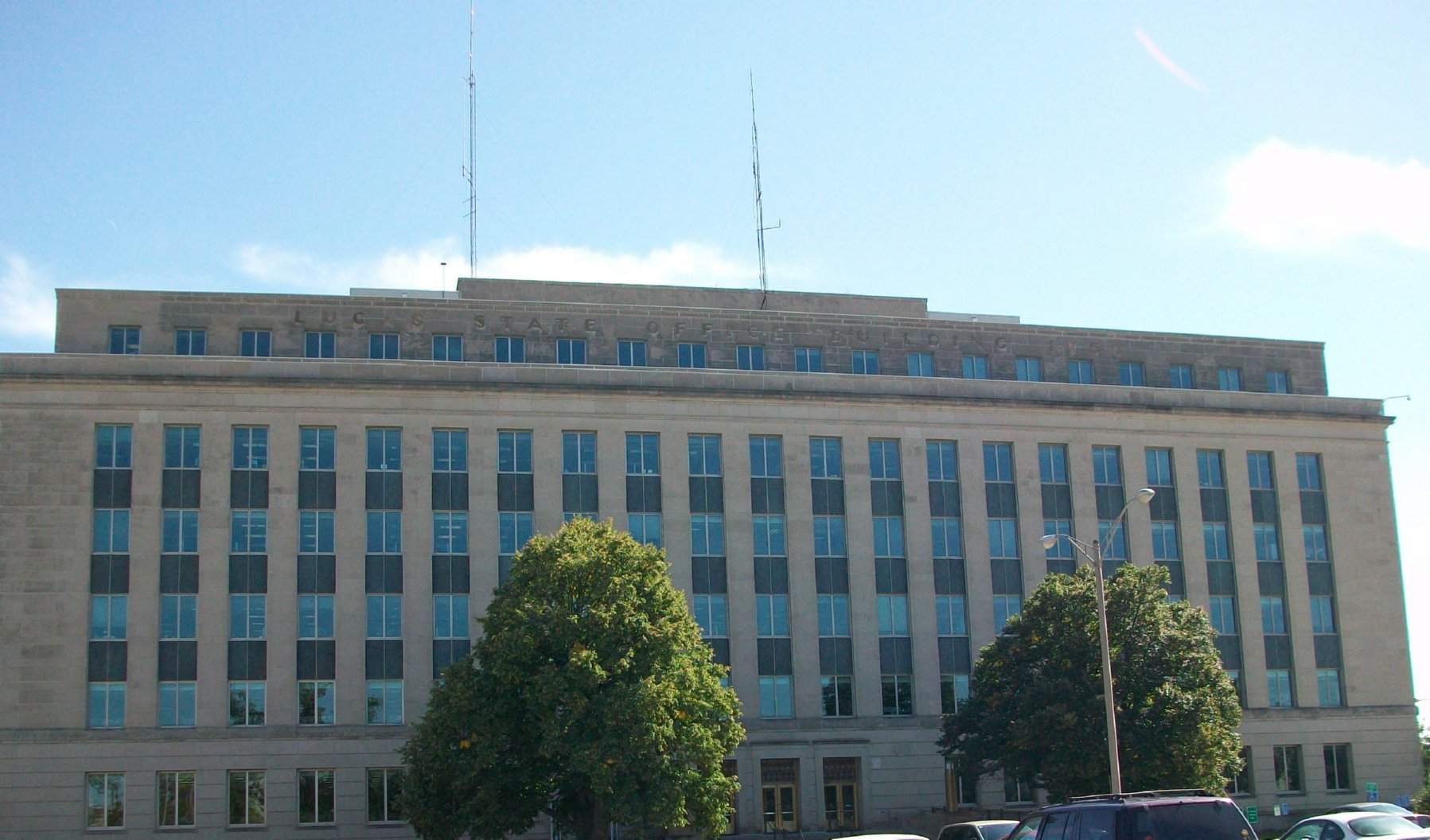
The Lucas State Office Building, in Des Moines, housing the Attorney General offices, Auditor of State offices, Department of Human Rights, Department of Inspections and Appeals, Department of Management, Department of Public Health, Iowa Communications Network, Iowa State Patrol, and Secretary of State offices

The secretary of state of Iowa is the commissioner of elections of the U.S. state of Iowa. A constitutional officer, the officeholder is elected every four years. The Office of the Secretary of State is divided into four divisions: Elections and Voter Registration, Business Services, Administrative Services, and Communications and Publications.

Elections and Voter Registration deals with supervising the 99 county auditors, elections, and voter registration. The division of the office helps the county auditors in telling them which election practices work best. The division also helps in increasing voter registration. The Business Services Division is a records center for businesses in Iowa. The Administrative Services Division and the Communications and Publications Division is involved in scheduling and providing media information, preservation of documents, recordkeeping, and publishing the Iowa Official Register and the Iowa Official Directory of Federal, State and County Officers. The Secretary of State's office is housed in the Lucas State Office Building in Des Moines.

== List of secretaries of state of Iowa ==
| # | Image | Name | Took office | Left office | Political party |
|---|---|---|---|---|---|
| 1 | | Elisha Cutler Jr. | 1846 | 1848 | Democratic |
| 2 | | Josiah H. Bonney | 1848 | 1850 | Democratic |
| 3 | | George W. McCleary | 1850 | 1856 | Democratic |
| 4 | | Elijah Sells | 1856 | 1863 | Republican |
| 5 | | James Wright | 1863 | 1867 | Republican |
| 6 | | Ed Wright | 1867 | 1873 | Republican |
| 7 | | Josiah T. Young | 1873 | 1879 | Republican |
| 8 | | John A. T. Hull | 1879 | 1885 | Republican |
| 9 | | Frank D. Jackson | 1885 | 1891 | Republican |
| 10 | | William M. McFarland | 1891 | 1897 | Republican |
| 11 | | George L. Dobson | 1897 | 1901 | Republican |
| 12 | | William B. Martin | 1901 | 1907 | Republican |
| 13 | | William C. Hayward | 1907 | 1913 | Republican |
| 14 | | William S. Allen | 1913 | 1919 | Republican |
| 15 | | Walter C. Ramsay | 1919 | 1928 | Republican |
| 16 | | Edward M. Smith | 1929 | 1931 | Republican |
| 17 | | G. C. Greenwalt | 1931 | 1933 | Republican |
| 18 | | Ola Babcock Miller | 1933 | 1937 | Democratic |
| 19 | | Robert E. O'Brien | 1937 | 1939 | Democratic |
| 20 | | Earl G. Miller | 1939 | 1943 | Republican |
| 21 | | Wayne M. Ropes | 1943 | 1947 | Republican |
| 22 | | Rollo H. Bergeson | 1947 | 1949 | Republican |
| 23 | | Melvin D. Synhorst | 1949 | 1965 | Republican |
| 24 | | Gary L. Cameron | 1965 | 1966 | Democratic |
| 25 | | Melvin D. Synhorst | 1967 | 1980 | Republican |
| 26 | | Mary Jane Odell | 1980 | 1987 | Republican |
| 27 | | Elaine Baxter | 1987 | 1995 | Democratic |
| 28 | | Paul Pate | 1995 | 1999 | Republican |
| 29 | | Chet Culver | 1999 | 2007 | Democratic |
| 30 | | Michael Mauro | 2007 | 2011 | Democratic |
| 31 | | Matt Schultz | 2011 | 2015 | Republican |
| 32 | | Paul Pate | 2015 | Incumbent | Republican |
