= Burnett Bergeson =

American farmer and politician (1915–2011)

Burnett J. Bergeson

Member of the Minnesota House of Representatives from the 64th district
- In office 1955–1962

Personal details
- Born: March 25, 1915 Canby, Minnesota, U.S.
- Died: February 2, 2011 (aged 95) Reno, Nevada, U.S.
- Party: Democratic-Farmer-Labor
- Occupation: Farmer, legislator

Burnett J. Bergeson (March 25, 1915 – February 2, 2011) was an American farmer and politician.

== Biography ==
Bergeson was born in Canby, Minnesota. He went to the Northwestern School of Agriculture at University of Minnesota Crookston. He lived in Twin Valley, Minnesota with his wife and family and was a farmer. Bergeson also worked for the United States Department of Agriculture as a dairy specialist and as a supervisor. Bergeson served for four terms in the Minnesota House of Representatives from 1955 to 1962 and was a Democrat. He retired and moved to Reno, Nevada. He died at his home in Reno, Nevada.
