= William C. Hayward =

American politician

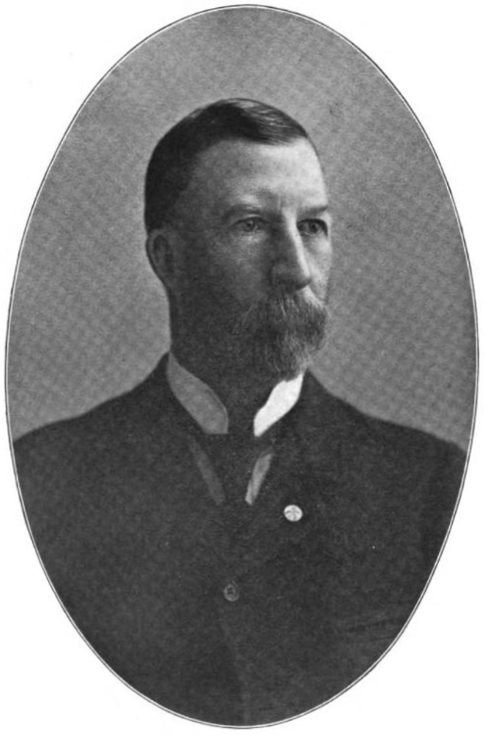

Secretary of State of Iowa
- In office 1907–1913

Member of the Iowa State Senate
- In office 1898–1907

Personal details
- Born: November 22, 1847 Cattaraugus County, New York
- Died: September 16, 1917 (aged 69) Davenport, Iowa
- Party: Republican
- Education: Iowa State University
- Occupation: Businessman, newspaper editor, politician

William C. Hayward (November 22, 1847 – September 16, 1917) was an American politician, newspaper editor, and businessman.

== Biography ==
Born in Cattaraugus County, New York, Hayward moved with his parents to Dakota County, Minnesota. Eventually, he settled in Garner, Hancock County, Iowa in 1873. Hayward went to Iowa State University. He owned the Hancock Signal newspaper and was postmaster for Garner, Iowa. Hayward then was involved with the banking and railroad businesses. He was also involved with farming and grain trading. in 1886, he moved to Davenport, Iowa. Hayward served on the Davenport School Board. From 1898 to 1907, Hayward served in the Iowa State Senate and was a Republican. From 1907 to 1913, Hayward served as Iowa Secretary of State. Hayward died from a stroke at his home in Davenport, Iowa.

Political offices
Preceded by William B. Martin	Secretary of State of Iowa; 1907–1913	Succeeded by William S. Allen
