= Senator Cutts =

Senator Cutts may refer to:

- Charles Cutts (1769–1846), U.S. Senator for New Hampshire
- Marsena E. Cutts (1833–1883), Iowa State Senate
