= Stanley L. Greigg =

American politician

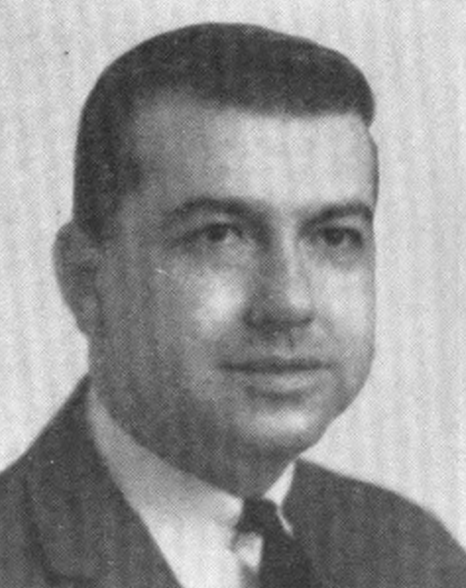

Member of the U.S. House of Representatives from Iowa's 6th district
- In office January 3, 1965 – January 3, 1967
- Preceded by: Charles B. Hoeven
- Succeeded by: Wiley Mayne

44th Mayor of Sioux City, Iowa
- In office January 1, 1964 – November 1964
- Preceded by: George Young
- Succeeded by: James Reeder

Personal details
- Born: May 7, 1931 Ireton, Iowa, US
- Died: June 13, 2002 (aged 71) Salem, Virginia, US
- Party: Democratic
- Spouse: Cathryn Thomson
- Education: Morningside College
- Profession: College Administrator

Military service
- Allegiance: United States of America
- Branch/service: United States Navy
- Years of service: 1957–1959
- Rank: E-3 Seaman

Stanley Lloyd Greigg (May 7, 1931 – June 13, 2002) was an American politician who served one term as a member of the U.S. House of Representatives from northwestern Iowa. A Democrat, he was elected to succeed longtime Republican representative Charles B. Hoeven in 1964 upon Hoeven's retirement, but lost to Republican Wiley Mayne two years later in 1966. Greigg later became a key player in the early stages of the notorious Watergate break-in in 1972.

== Biography ==
Greigg was born in Ireton, Iowa, and spent his earliest years there and in nearby Hawarden, where his parents were involved in the restaurant business. Greigg's family moved to Sioux City, Iowa and operated a restaurant there. After his father died in 1942, Greigg assisted his mother in running the restaurant. He continued to do so before and after his graduation from Sioux City East High School.

Greigg received his B.A. at Morningside College in Sioux City in 1954, then spent two years at Syracuse University in graduate work in the Maxwell School of Citizenship and Public Affairs. He served in the United States Navy from 1957 to 1959 attaining the rank of Seaman (E-3).

He returned to Sioux City to serve as the Dean of Men of his alma mater, Morningside College, where he also taught speech and history courses. He was elected to the city council of Sioux City in 1961, becoming the city's youngest elected councilman and biggest council vote-getter in its history. In January 1964, at age 33, he was elected mayor of Sioux City.

== Career ==
In 1964, as part of a Democratic landslide, Greigg was elected to represent Iowa's 6th congressional district in the U.S. House of Representatives. defeating Republican Howard N. Sokol by over 10,000 votes. Longtime Republican Congressman Charles B. Hoeven had held the seat for 22 years, and his retirement had "created a political vacuum and a bitter Republican party fight," to Greigg's benefit. One of Greigg's top priorities in his campaign was to expand government assistance programs for very small businesses. Like many other freshman Democrats elected in 1964 in Republican-leaning districts, Greigg served only one term. In 1966, his re-election bid was thwarted by Sioux City attorney Wiley Mayne, who defeated Greigg by nearly 20,000 votes.

Greigg served as director of the United States Post Office Department's Office of Regional Administration from 1967 to 1969. While holding that position, Greigg's name again surfaced in Iowa in the summer of 1968, when the leading candidate in the Democratic primary race for his former seat withdrew without explanation on the eve of the district convention. Greigg was hesitant to jump into the race, however, and his party's support went to his former legislative aide, Jerry O'Sullivan, who won the nomination but lost to Mayne in a landslide.

== Watergate break-in ==
Greigg served as the deputy chairman of the Democratic National Committee from 1970 to July 1972. It was in that position that Greigg found himself at the genesis of the Watergate scandal in the early morning hours of June 17, 1972. In the office of Greigg's personal secretary, in DNC headquarters at the Watergate complex, D.C. police officers first confronted burglars carrying eavesdropping devices. Awakened early that morning by a call from a D.C. policeman and informed that his offices had been burglarized, Greigg asked, "did you catch the kids?" The officer responded, "no, sir, these men we arrested were in business suits." Greigg called DNC Director Lawrence O'Brien, and told him that "all hell had broken loose."

Later that morning Greigg signed the original criminal complaint. That complaint led to a series of investigations that culminated in the resignation of President Richard M. Nixon. Ironically, the Watergate scandal also ended the congressional career of the man who defeated Greigg in 1966, Wiley Mayne. While serving as a member of the House Judiciary Committee in 1974 during its consideration of articles of impeachment of Nixon, Mayne voted against the articles, changing his position only later, after the most damning evidence emerged. That year Mayne lost his bid for re-election, in an outcome attributed to his votes against impeachment.

In July 1972, Greigg moved from his party position to a similar role in the 1972 presidential campaign of George McGovern. He also served as director of the Lawrence F. O'Brien Center at Dag Hammarskjold College in 1972.

== Congressional Budget Office ==
Greigg returned to Capitol Hill in an appointed position, serving in the Congressional Budget Office and ultimately becoming the director of its Office of Intergovernmental Relations. Greigg served with the Congressional Budget Office from 1975 to 1998.

== Death ==
Greigg died on June 13, 2002, in Salem, Virginia. At the time of his death, he was serving as vice president of the metropolitan Washington synod of the Evangelical Lutheran Church in America. He is interred in Arlington National Cemetery.

U.S. House of Representatives
Preceded by Charles B. Hoeven	Member of the U.S. House of Representatives from Iowa's 6th congressional district 1965 – 1967 (obsolete district)	Succeeded by Wiley Mayne
