= Nathan E. Kendall =

American politician (1868–1936)

Nathan Edward Kendall
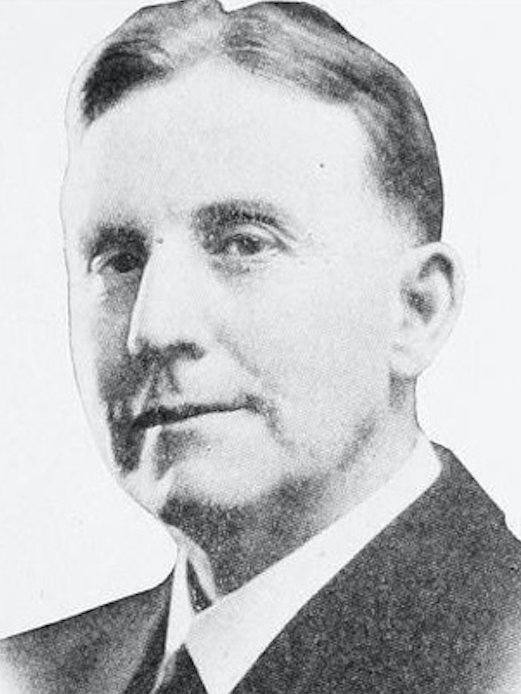

23rd Governor of Iowa
- In office January 13, 1921 – January 15, 1925
- Lieutenant: John Hammill
- Preceded by: William L. Harding
- Succeeded by: John Hammill

Member of the U.S. House of Representatives from Iowa's 6th district
- In office March 4, 1909 – March 3, 1913
- Preceded by: Daniel W. Hamilton
- Succeeded by: Sanford Kirkpatrick

Speaker of the Iowa House of Representatives
- In office 1907-1909

Member of the Iowa House of Representatives
- In office 1899–1909

Monroe County Attorney
- In office 1893–1897

Albia City Attorney
- In office 1890–1892

Personal details
- Born: March 17, 1868 Greenville, Iowa, U.S.
- Died: November 5, 1936 (aged 68) Des Moines, Iowa, U.S.
- Party: Republican
- Spouse(s): Belle Wooden (m. 1896; died 1926) Mabel Fry Bonnell (m. 1928)

Nathan Edward Kendall (March 17, 1868 – November 5, 1936) was an American Republican politician. Kendall was a two-term U.S. representative from Iowa's 6th congressional district and the 23rd governor of Iowa.

== Background ==
Born on a farm near Greenville, Iowa, the last of six children of Elijah J. and Lucinda (Stevens) Kendall. His parents were from Indiana and moved to Iowa in 1852. Kendall attended the rural schools until the eighth grade. After moving to Albia, Iowa, he began reading law at age fifteen, working as a stenographer in a law office and was admitted to the bar in May 1889. He commenced practice in Albia in 1889. On April 20, 1896, he married a schoolteacher named Belle Wooden.

== Political career ==
=== Local and State Career ===
He was Albia city attorney from 1890 to 1892, then Monroe County Attorney from 1893 to 1897. In 1899, he was elected to the Iowa House of Representatives, where he served for ten years and ultimately became Speaker of the House during his last term.

=== US House ===
In 1908, Kendall ran as a Republican for the U.S. House seat for Iowa's 6th congressional district, then held by incumbent one-term Democrat Daniel W. Hamilton. Defeating Hamilton in a close race, Kendall served in the 61st Congress, then was re-elected in 1910, serving in the Sixty-second Congress. He won the Republican primary in June 1912 over two challengers, but pulled out of the race in August, after suffering a heart attack. In all, he served in Congress from March 4, 1909, to March 3, 1913. After returning from Washington, he resumed the practice of law in Albia.

=== Iowa Governorship ===
In 1920, Kendall was elected Governor of Iowa, defeating Democrat and future Governor Clyde L. Herring. He served two terms, from 1921 to 1925.

During his tenure, the state government was restructured by reorganizing the overlapping state boards, bureaus, and commissions. The Department of Agriculture was also established, removing 5 state boards.

Additionally, security brokers were assessed and required to be licensed, orphaned, handicapped and abused children were given protections and provided for financially and the state's park and highway systems were expanded.

Kendall's most personally notable achievement was the $2.25 Million appropriation to fully fund University of Iowa, College of Medicine hospital.

== Later life ==
In 1930, he gave his private library of 6,500-7,000 volumes to the City of Albia, with funds of $10,0000 to double the capacity of the library.

His wife, Belle, died on March 18, 1926, in Naples, Italy of a stroke while they were on tour of Europe. The Belle Kendall Community Playhouse in Des Moines is named after her, which was made after a gift from Gov. Kendall, following his wife's death.

He married Mabel Fry Bonnell on June 28, 1928, at her parents home in Point Chautauqua, New York. She was the widow of William Bonnell.

He resided in Des Moines, Iowa, until his death on November 5, 1936. His remains were cremated and the ashes interred on the lawn of "Kendall Place," his former home in Albia.

Party political offices
Preceded by William L. Harding	Republican nominee Governor of Iowa; 1920, 1922	Succeeded by John Hammill
U.S. House of Representatives
Preceded by Daniel W. Hamilton	Member of the U.S. House of Representatives from Iowa's 6th congressional district 1909–1913	Succeeded by Sanford Kirkpatrick
Political offices
Preceded by William L. Harding	Governor of Iowa; 1921–1925	Succeeded by John Hammill
