= 1922 Iowa gubernatorial election =

- November 7, 1922
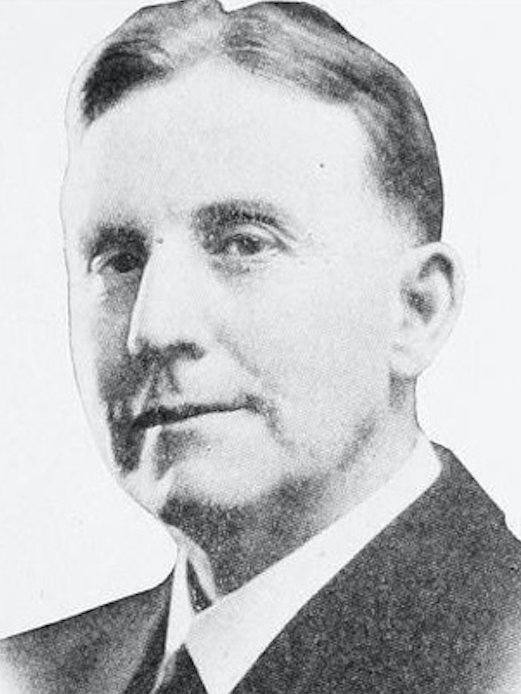

| Nominee | Nathan E. Kendall | J.R. Files |
| Party | Republican | Democratic |
| Popular vote | 419,648 | 175,252 |
| Percentage | 70.54% | 29.46% |
- County results Kendall: 50–60% 60–70% 70–80% 80–90% >90% Files: 50–60%
Governor before election
Nathan E. Kendall
Republican
Elected Governor
Nathan E. Kendall
Republican

The 1922 Iowa gubernatorial election was held on November 7, 1922. Incumbent Republican Nathan E. Kendall defeated Democratic nominee J.R. Files with 70.54% of the vote.

== General election ==
=== Candidates ===
- Nathan E. Kendall, Republican
- J.R. Files, Democratic

=== Results ===
1922 Iowa gubernatorial election
| Party | Candidate | Votes | % | ±% |
|---|---|---|---|---|
| Republican | Nathan E. Kendall (incumbent) | 419,648 | 70.54% | |
| Democratic | J.R. Files | 175,252 | 29.46% | |
| Majority | | 244,396 | | |
| Turnout | | | | |
| Republican hold | | Swing | | |
