= Daniel W. Hamilton (politician) =

American politician

Daniel Hamilton
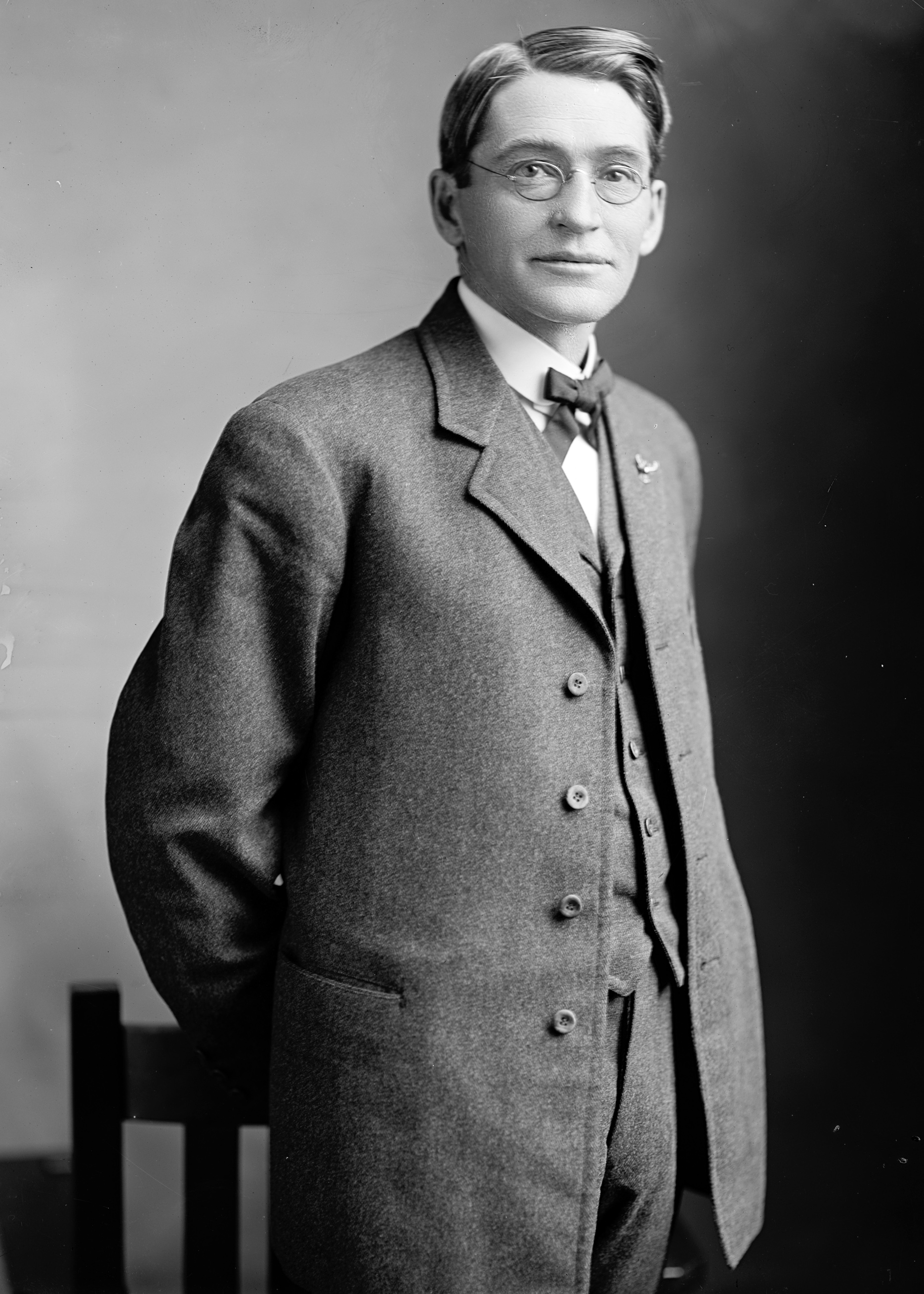

Member of the U.S. House of Representatives from Iowa's 6th district
- In office March 4, 1907 – March 3, 1909
- Preceded by: John F. Lacey
- Succeeded by: Nathan E. Kendall

Personal details
- Born: December 20, 1861 Dixon, Illinois
- Died: August 21, 1936 (aged 74) Rochester, Minnesota
- Party: Democratic

Daniel Webster Hamilton (December 20, 1861 – August 21, 1936) was a one-term Democratic U.S. Representative from Iowa's 6th congressional district.

Born near Dixon, Illinois, Hamilton moved to Miami County, Kansas, with his parents, in 1868 and to Prairie Township in Keokuk County, Iowa, in 1874. He attended the country schools and graduated from the University of Iowa College of Law in June 1884.

He was admitted to the bar in 1884. Returning to Keokuk County, he commenced practice in Sigourney, Iowa. He served as Postmaster of Sigourney from 1894 to 1898.

In November 1906, Hamilton ran as a Democrat against longtime Republican Congressman John F. Lacey in the general election for Iowa's 6th congressional district. After defeating Lacey, Hamilton became the only Democrat in Iowa's congressional delegation in the Sixtieth Congress. He ran for re-election in 1908, and won renomination from his party's district convention. However, in a general election in which Republicans swept all major races on the ballot in Iowa, Hamilton was defeated by Republican Nathan E. Kendall in a close race. In all he served in Congress from March 4, 1907, to March 3, 1909.

He resumed the practice of law in Sigourney. In 1918, he was elected judge of the district court of the sixth judicial district of Iowa, in which capacity he served until his death in Rochester, Minnesota, on August 21, 1936. He was interred in No. 16 Cemetery, near Thornburg, in Keokuk County.

U.S. House of Representatives
| Preceded by John F. Lacey | Member of the U.S. House of Representatives from Iowa's 6th congressional district 1907–1909 | Succeeded by Nathan E. Kendall |
