= 1920 Iowa gubernatorial election =

- November 2, 1920
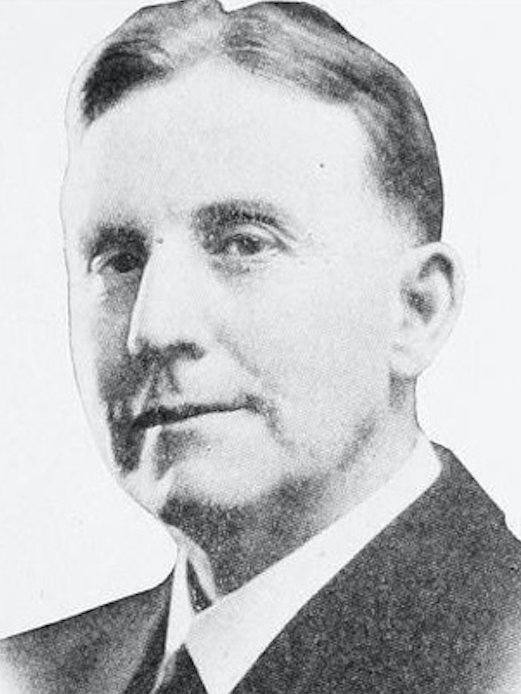

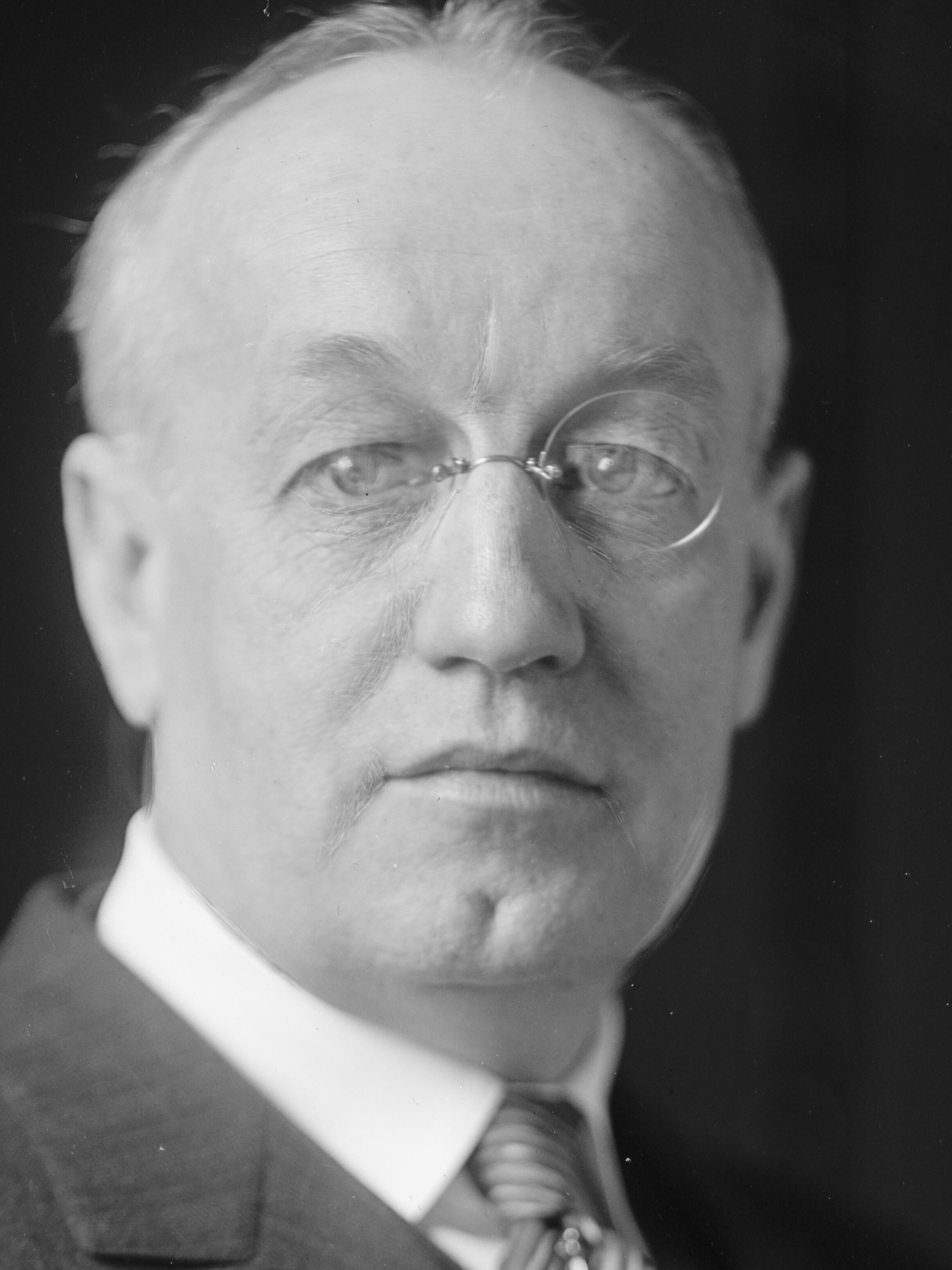
Nominee	Nathan E. Kendall	Clyde L. Herring
Party	Republican	Democratic
Popular vote	513,118	338,108
Percentage	58.66%	38.65%
- County results Kendall: 40–50% 50–60% 60–70% 70–80% Herring: 50–60%
Governor before election
William L. Harding
Republican
Elected Governor
Nathan E. Kendall
Republican

The 1920 Iowa gubernatorial election was held on November 2, 1920. Republican nominee Nathan E. Kendall defeated Democratic nominee Clyde L. Herring with 58.66% of the vote.

== General election ==
=== Candidates ===
Major party candidates

- Nathan E. Kendall, Republican
- Clyde L. Herring, Democratic

Other candidates

- George J. Peck, Socialist
- Mathis Faber, Farmer–Labor
- J. Jay Hisel, Socialist Labor

=== Results ===
1920 Iowa gubernatorial election
Party	Candidate	Votes	%	±%
Republican	Nathan E. Kendall	513,118	58.66%	
Democratic	Clyde L. Herring	338,108	38.65%	
Socialist	George J. Peck	13,671	1.56%	
Farmer–Labor	Mathis Faber	9,153	1.05%	
Socialist Labor	J. Jay Hisel	760	0.09%	
Majority		175,010		
Turnout				
Republican hold		Swing		
