= Paul Cunningham (politician) =

American politician (1890–1961)

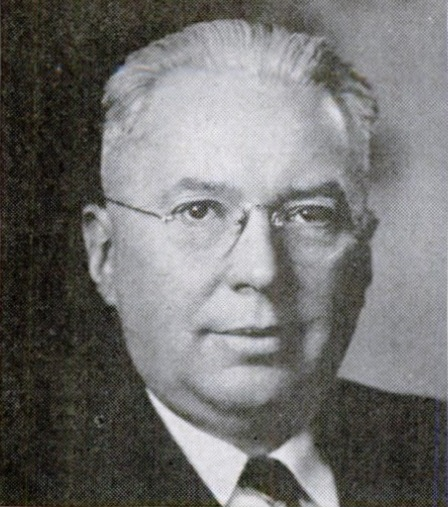
- Cunningham in 1953

Member of the U.S. House of Representatives from Iowa
- In office January 3, 1941 – January 3, 1959
- Preceded by: Robert K. Goodwin (6th); Karl M. LeCompte (5th)
- Succeeded by: Fred C. Gilchrist (6th); Neal Smith (5th)
- Constituency: 6th district (1941-43); 5th district (1943-59)

Personal details
- Born: June 15, 1890 Indiana County, Pennsylvania, U.S.
- Died: July 16, 1961 (aged 71) Brainerd, Minnesota, U.S
- Party: Republican
- Education: University of Michigan

Military service
- Allegiance: United States of America
- Branch/service: United States Army
- Years of service: 1917–1919
- Rank: First lieutenant
- Battles/wars: World War I

Paul Harvey Cunningham (June 15, 1890 – July 16, 1961) served nine consecutive terms as a Republican U.S. Representative from Iowa. First elected in 1940, he was re-elected eight times, and defeated in 1958.

Born on a farm in Indiana County, Pennsylvania near Kent, Cunningham attended the public schools. He graduated from State Teachers College, Indiana, Pennsylvania, in 1911, from the literary department of the University of Michigan at Ann Arbor in 1914, and from its Law School in 1915. He was admitted to the bar in 1915 and commenced practice in Grand Rapids, Michigan.

During the First World War, from 1917 to 1919, he served as a first lieutenant in the Infantry.

He moved to Des Moines, Iowa, in 1919 and continued the practice of law. He served as member of the Iowa National Guard from 1920 to 1923. He was elected to the Iowa House of Representatives in 1933, and served until 1937.

On February 4, 1940, Congressman Cassius C. Dowell died, thereby creating a vacancy in Iowa's 6th congressional district. Cunningham fell four votes short of receiving the Republican Party's nomination as its candidate in the March 5, 1940 special election. Although Robert K. Goodwin received the nomination and won the special election, Cunningham received his party's nomination for the 1940 general election, where he defeated E. Frank Fox.

Iowa's districts were reapportioned before the next election to reflect the loss of one Iowa seat, placing Cunningham's home county (Polk) in Iowa's 5th congressional district. In 1942, and in the next eight elections, Cunningham was re-elected to Congress from that district.

In 1958, Cunningham faced a challenge from Neal Smith, then seeking his first term. Two weeks before the election, Cunningham was slightly favored to win, based on a split within the Polk County Democratic Party's organization. However, Smith defeated Cunningham, winning his first of eighteen terms. Cunningham's congressional service began January 3, 1941, and ended January 3, 1959. Cunningham voted in favor of the Civil Rights Act of 1957.

After his defeat, Cunningham resumed the practice of law. He died at his summer home on Gull Lake, Brainerd, Minnesota, on July 16, 1961. He was interred in Masonic Cemetery, Des Moines, Iowa.

U.S. House of Representatives
Preceded by Robert K. Goodwin	Member of the U.S. House of Representatives from Iowa's 6th congressional district 1941 – 1943	Succeeded by Fred C. Gilchrist
Preceded by Karl M. LeCompte	Member of the U.S. House of Representatives from Iowa's 5th congressional district 1943 – 1959	Succeeded by Neal Smith
