= Iowa's 6th congressional district =

Former U.S. congressional district

- Obsolete district
- Created: 1860
- Eliminated: 1990
- Years active: 1863–1993

Iowa's 6th congressional district is a former U.S. congressional district in the State of Iowa. It existed in elections from 1862 to 1992, when it was lost due to Iowa's population growth rate being lower than that of the country as a whole.

The district was created during the Civil War; it was first filled in the 1862 general election. Its original representative, Asahel W. Hubbard, was from Sioux City in Northwestern Iowa, but redistricting caused the district to be relocated, first to central Iowa (from 1869 to 1874), then to south-central Iowa (from 1875 to 1932), then the Des Moines area (from 1933 to 1942) and then north-central Iowa (from 1943 to 1962). From 1963 to 1992, the district was made up of counties in the northwestern part of the state. Fred Grandy, the 6th district's last representative, was, like its first, a Sioux City native.

== List of members representing the district ==
Member	Party	Term	Congress	Electoral history
District created March 4, 1863
Asahel W. Hubbard (Sioux City)	Republican	March 4, 1863 – March 3, 1869	38th 39th 40th	Elected in 1862. Re-elected in 1864. Re-elected in 1866. Retired.
Charles Pomeroy (Fort Dodge)	Republican	March 4, 1869 – March 3, 1871	41st	Elected in 1868. Lost renomination.
Jackson Orr (Montana)	Republican	March 4, 1871 – March 3, 1873	42nd	Elected in 1870. Redistricted to the 9th district.
William Loughridge (Oskaloosa)	Republican	March 4, 1873 – March 3, 1875	43rd	Elected in 1872. Lost renomination.
Ezekiel S. Sampson (Sigourney)	Republican	March 4, 1875 – March 3, 1879	44th 45th	Elected in 1874. Re-elected in 1876. Lost re-election.
James Weaver (Bloomfield)	Greenback	March 4, 1879 – March 3, 1881	46th	Elected in 1878. Retired to run for president.
Marsena E. Cutts (Oskaloosa)	Republican	March 4, 1881 – March 3, 1883	47th	Elected in 1880. Lost contested election.
John C. Cook (Newton)	Democratic	March 3, 1883 – March 3, 1883	47th	Won contested election but only served one day. Lost re-election.
Marsena E. Cutts (Oskaloosa)	Republican	March 4, 1883 – September 1, 1883	48th	Elected in 1882. Died.
Vacant		September 1, 1883 – October 9, 1883	48th	
John C. Cook (Newton)	Democratic	October 9, 1883 – March 3, 1885	48th	Elected to finish Cutts's term. Lost re-election.
James Weaver (Bloomfield)	Greenback	March 4, 1885 – March 3, 1889	49th 50th	Elected in 1884. Re-elected in 1886. Lost re-election.
John F. Lacey (Oskaloosa)	Republican	March 4, 1889 – March 3, 1891	51st	Elected in 1888. Lost re-election.
Frederick E. White (Webster)	Democratic	March 4, 1891 – March 3, 1893	52nd	Elected in 1890. Lost re-election.
John F. Lacey (Oskaloosa)	Republican	March 4, 1893 – March 3, 1907	53rd 54th 55th 56th 57th 58th 59th	Elected in 1892. Re-elected in 1894. Re-elected in 1896. Re-elected in 1898. Re-elected in 1900. Re-elected in 1902. Re-elected in 1904. Lost re-election.
Daniel W. Hamilton (Sigourney)	Democratic	March 4, 1907 – March 3, 1909	60th	Elected in 1906. Lost re-election.
Nathan E. Kendall (Albia)	Republican	March 4, 1909 – March 3, 1913	61st 62nd	Elected in 1908. Re-elected in 1910. Renominated but withdrew prior to election.
Sanford Kirkpatrick (Ottumwa)	Democratic	March 4, 1913 – March 3, 1915	63rd	Elected in 1912. Lost renomination.
C. William Ramseyer (Bloomfield)	Republican	March 4, 1915 – March 3, 1933	64th 65th 66th 67th 68th 69th 70th 71st 72nd	Elected in 1914. Re-elected in 1916. Re-elected in 1918. Re-elected in 1920. Re-elected in 1922. Re-elected in 1924. Re-elected in 1926. Re-elected in 1928. Re-elected in 1930. Redistricted to the 5th district and lost renomination there.
Cassius C. Dowell (Des Moines)	Republican	March 4, 1933 – January 3, 1935	73rd	Redistricted from the 7th district and re-elected in 1932. Lost re-election.
Hubert Utterback (Des Moines)	Democratic	January 3, 1935 – January 3, 1937	74th	Elected in 1934. Retired to run for U.S. Senator.
Cassius C. Dowell (Des Moines)	Republican	January 3, 1937 – February 4, 1940	75th 76th	Elected in 1936. Re-elected in 1938. Died.
Vacant		February 4, 1940 – March 5, 1940	76th	
Robert K. Goodwin (Redfield)	Republican	March 5, 1940 – January 3, 1941	76th	Elected to finish Dowell's term. Retired.
Paul Cunningham (Des Moines)	Republican	January 3, 1941 – January 3, 1943	77th	Elected in 1940. Redistricted to the 5th district.
Fred C. Gilchrist (Laurens)	Republican	January 3, 1943 – January 3, 1945	78th	Redistricted from the 8th district and re-elected in 1942. Lost renomination.
James I. Dolliver (Fort Dodge)	Republican	January 3, 1945 – January 3, 1957	79th 80th 81st 82nd 83rd 84th	Elected in 1944. Re-elected in 1946. Re-elected in 1948. Re-elected in 1950. Re-elected in 1952. Re-elected in 1954. Lost re-election.
Merwin Coad (Boone)	Democratic	January 3, 1957 – January 3, 1963	85th 86th 87th	Elected in 1956. Re-elected in 1958. Re-elected in 1960. Retired.
Charles B. Hoeven (Alton)	Republican	January 3, 1963 – January 3, 1965	88th	Redistricted from the 8th district and re-elected in 1962. Retired.
Stanley L. Greigg (Sioux City)	Democratic	January 3, 1965 – January 3, 1967	89th	Elected in 1964. Lost re-election.
Wiley Mayne (Sioux City)	Republican	January 3, 1967 – January 3, 1975	90th 91st 92nd 93rd	Elected in 1966. Re-elected in 1968. Re-elected in 1970. Re-elected in 1972. Lost re-election.
Berkley Bedell (Spirit Lake)	Democratic	January 3, 1975 – January 3, 1987	94th 95th 96th 97th 98th 99th	Elected in 1974. Re-elected in 1976. Re-elected in 1978. Re-elected in 1980. Re-elected in 1982. Re-elected in 1984. Retired.
Fred Grandy (Sioux City)	Republican	January 3, 1987 – January 3, 1993	100th 101st 102nd	Elected in 1986. Re-elected in 1988. Re-elected in 1990. Redistricted to the 5th district.
District eliminated January 3, 1993

The district was eliminated as a result of the 1990 census. All of the district was put in the 5th district except for Cerro Gordo County which was put in the 2nd district.

== General election history (from 1920) ==
Year	Party affiliation	Winner	Number of votes	Party affiliation	Loser	Number of votes	Percentage of votes
1920	Republican	C. William Ramseyer	41,644	Democratic	O.P. Meyers	21,538	66% - 34%
1922	Republican	C. William Ramseyer	28,702	Democratic	James E. Craven	17,489	62% - 38%
1924	Republican	C. William Ramseyer	42,843	Democratic	James V. Curran	19,028	69% - 31%
1926	Republican	C. William Ramseyer	27,967	Democratic	W.L. Etter	14,193	66% - 34%
1928	Republican	C. William Ramseyer	43,259	Democratic	C. Ver Ploeg	23,065	65% - 35%
1930	Republican	C. William Ramseyer	25,875	Democratic	S.F. McConnell	16,811	61% - 39%
1932	Republican	Cassius C. Dowell	56,962	Democratic	Charles S. Cooter	43,891	56% - 44%
1934	Democratic	Hubert Utterback	50,828	Republican	Cassius C. Dowell	46,074	52% - 47%
1936	Republican	Cassius C. Dowell	63,026	Democratic	Harry B. Dunlap	55,975	52% - 46%
1938	Republican	Cassius C. Dowell	53,505	Democratic	Hubert Utterback	37,056	58% - 41%
1940	Republican	Paul H. Cunningham	70,707	Democratic	E. Frank Cox	64,314	52% - 48%
1942	Republican	Fred C. Gilchrist	46,843	Democratic	Edward Breen	30,802	60% - 40%
1944	Republican	James I. Dolliver	60,153	Democratic	Charles Hanna	40,098	59% - 39%
1946	Republican	James I. Dolliver	40,640	Democratic	Oscar E. Johnson	23,422	63% - 37%
1948	Republican	James I. Dolliver	55,641	Democratic	James E. Irwin	44,002	56% - 44%
1950	Republican	James I. Dolliver	56,982	Democratic	Maurice O'Reilly	30,877	64% - 35%
1952	Republican	James I. Dolliver	86,842	Democratic	Francis G. Cutler	39,245	69% - 31%
1954	Republican	James I. Dolliver	53,457	Democratic	Lumund F. Wilcox	35,137	60% - 40%
1956	Democratic	Merwin Coad	64,625	Republican	James I. Dolliver	64,427	50.1% - 49.9%
1958	Democratic	Merwin Coad	57,491	Republican	Robert E. Waggoner	41,204	58% - 42%
1960	Democratic	Merwin Coad	70,353	Republican	Curtis G. Reihm	60,834	54% - 46%
1962	Republican	Charles B. Hoeven	66,940	Democratic	Donaled W. Murray	47,524	58% - 42%
1964	Democratic	Stanley L. Greigg	86,323	Republican	Howard N. Sokol	75,478	53% - 46%
1966	Republican	Wiley Mayne	73,274	Democratic	Stanley L. Greigg	53,917	57% - 42%
1968	Republican	Wiley Mayne	100,802	Democratic	Jerry O. Sullivan	54,171	65% - 35%
1970	Republican	Wiley Mayne	57,285	Democratic	Fred H. Moore	43,257	57% - 43%
1972	Republican	Wiley Mayne	103,284	Democratic	Berkley Bedell	93,574	52% - 48%
1974	Democratic	Berkley Bedell	86,315	Republican	Wiley Mayne	71,695	55% - 45%
1976	Democratic	Berkley Bedell	133,507	Republican	Joanne D. Soper	62,292	67% - 31%
1978	Democratic	Berkley Bedell	87,139	Republican	Willis Edgar Junker	44,320	66% - 34%
1980	Democratic	Berkley Bedell	129,460	Republican	Clarence S. Carney	71,866	64% - 36%
1982	Democratic	Berkley Bedell	101,690	Republican	Al Bremer	56,487	64% - 36%
1984	Democratic	Berkley Bedell	127,706	Republican	Darrel Rensink	78,182	62% - 38%
1986	Republican	Fred Grandy	81,861	Democratic	Clayton Hodgson	78,807	51% - 49%
1988	Republican	Fred Grandy	125,859	Democratic	Dave O'Brien	69,614	64% - 36%
1990	Republican	Fred Grandy	112,333	Democratic	Mike D. Earll	44,063	72% - 28%

== See also ==
- List of United States representatives from Iowa
- Iowa's congressional districts
