= Fred Grandy =

American actor and politician

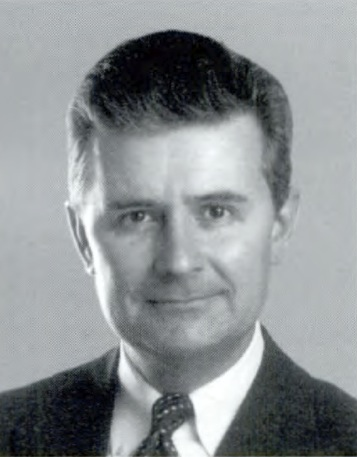
- Grandy in 1993

Member of the U.S. House of Representatives from Iowa
- In office January 3, 1987 – January 3, 1995
- Preceded by: Berkley Bedell
- Succeeded by: Tom Latham
- Constituency: 6th district (1987–1993); 5th district (1993–1995)

Personal details
- Born: Fredrick Lawrence Grandy; June 29, 1948 (age 78) Sioux City, Iowa, U.S.
- Party: Republican
- Spouses: Jan Gough (m. 1969; div. 1983); Catherine Mann (m. 1987)
- Children: 3, including Charlie
- Education: Harvard University (BA); George Washington University (MFA)

Fredrick Lawrence Grandy (born June 29, 1948) is an American actor and politician. As an actor, he notably portrayed Burl "Gopher" Smith on the TV series The Love Boat. As a Republican, he was a member of the U.S. House of Representatives from Iowa from 1987 to 1995. From 2003 to 2011 Grandy hosted a morning drive time radio talk show on 630 WMAL in Washington, D.C.

== Early life, family and education ==
Grandy was born in Sioux City, Iowa, the youngest of three sons of William Grandy, who worked in his father's insurance business, and his wife, Bonnie. When Grandy was eleven, his father died of a heart attack. His mother died of an aneurysm a year later.

The young Grandy was then raised by Margaret Avery, his mother's best friend (a widow who later married his father's doctor). He attended public schools until ninth grade, after which he attended high school at Phillips Exeter Academy in Exeter, New Hampshire, as his father and brothers had done. At Exeter, Grandy was the roommate of David Eisenhower, the grandson of President Dwight D. Eisenhower, and was later best man at Eisenhower's wedding to Julie Nixon, the daughter of then–president-elect Richard Nixon, in December 1968.

Grandy graduated magna cum laude with a bachelor's degree in English studies from Harvard University in 1970. In 1971, he joined The Proposition, an improvisational group at Harvard, and then rejoined the show when it moved off-Broadway in 1971. Among his co-stars was future Saturday Night Live star Jane Curtin. Although of service age, Grandy had a high lottery number and was not drafted for Vietnam.

Grandy holds a master of fine arts (MFA) degree from the Washington Shakespeare Theatre and George Washington University, graduating at age 50.

== Career ==
=== Acting ===
Grandy played purser Burl "Gopher" Smith on the American television series The Love Boat. The series aired for nine seasons (1977–1986). He wrote several vignettes for the show.

In 1982, while visiting Turkey to film scenes for the show, Grandy suffered severe burns when a balloon filled with hydrogen exploded.

Before gaining prominence on The Love Boat, Grandy had guest roles on many shows, including Love, American Style (1969); The Mary Tyler Moore Show (1970); Maude (1973); Phyllis (1975); and Welcome Back, Kotter (1975). Grandy also acted in the 1973 made-for-TV movie The Girl Most Likely to..., as Ted Gates.

He starred in the Saturday morning TV series Monster Squad (1976) as Walt, a criminology student working as a night watchman at "Fred's Wax Museum". He also appeared in a number of episodes of the TV game show Match Game from 1979 to 1981. He usually sat in the male guest-star seat in the top row left. He later appeared in a week's worth of episodes on its sequel, the Match Game/Hollywood Squares Hour.

In May 2013, Grandy returned to the stage, starring in a production of Sleuth at the Surflight Theatre in Beach Haven, New Jersey. In 2014 Grandy had a recurring role as Dr. William Ledreau on Season 3 of The Mindy Project for which his son, Charlie Grandy, is a writer. He has also had recurring roles in two TV series, Knight Squad and Sprung. He performed around the country in regional theatre productions of How to Succeed in Business Without Really Trying, On Golden Pond, I'm Not Rappaport, and Give 'em Hell, Harry!.

=== Politics ===
Grandy's political interests preceded his acting career. Between 1970 and 1971, he served as a speechwriter for Wiley Mayne, the Republican congressman from his home district, Iowa's 6th congressional district.

With Mayne's successor, Democrat Berkley Bedell, deciding not to run in 1986, Grandy, a Republican, campaigned for the open Iowa United States House of Representatives seat, beating Clayton Hodgson by two percentage points (51.0% to 49.0%).

Although Grandy tried to distance himself from his acting career (at the time), he said to People magazine, "if there were no Gopher, there would be no Fred Grandy for Congress."

During his four terms in Congress, he served on a variety of committees, including Ways and Means, Agriculture, Standards of Official Conduct, and Education and the Workforce. While a member of Congress, Grandy won eight "Watchdog of the Treasury" awards.

In 1994, Grandy declined to run for another Congressional term and instead entered the Republican primary race for governor of Iowa against incumbent Terry Branstad, but lost the election by nearly four percentage points.

=== Radio and other ===
Grandy served as president and CEO of Goodwill Industries International from 1995 to 2000. He later became a political commentator for National Public Radio and served as a visiting professor teaching a course on nonprofit organizations at the School of Public Affairs at the University of Maryland, College Park.

From 2003 to 2010, Grandy and radio veteran Andy Parks were the hosts of The Grandy & Andy Morning Show, a conservative radio talk show on 630 WMAL in Washington, D.C. In May 2010, the program was reconfigured and was afterward called The Grandy Group. On March 3, 2011, Grandy resigned from the program allegedly over a dispute about his and his wife's statements about Islamic extremism or low listenership.

Grandy was also the host of a show on Retirement Living TV called Daily Café (with MSNBC anchor Alex Witt). Since then he has been a Senior Fellow for National Security Affairs at the Washington-based Center for Security Policy, a far-right, anti-Muslim, Washington, D.C.–based think tank, developing and managing projects on domestic terrorism and counterintelligence.

== Personal life ==
Grandy has been married twice. In 1969 he married Jan Gough, a student at Radcliffe. They had a son, Charlie Grandy, and a daughter before divorcing in 1983. On March 28, 1987, Grandy married novelist Catherine Mann, whom he had met when she interviewed him as one of the first reporters for Entertainment Tonight. They have one daughter (born 1988). In 1993, Grandy and his wife sporadically toured Iowa with a stage production of the play Love Letters for charity (especially children's charities).

== Filmography ==
Year	Film	Role	Notes
1973	Love, American Style	Larry	Segment: "Love and the See-Through Mind"
1973	The Girl Most Likely to...	Dr. Ted Gates	TV movie
1973–74	Maude	Chris	7 episodes
1975	The Mary Tyler Moore Show	Rev. J.W. Dannenbrink	Episode: "You Can't Lose 'em All"
1975	Death Race 2000	Herman "the German" Boch	Feature film
1975	Phyllis	The Newlyweds – Young Man	Episode: "Phyllis' Garage Sale"
1975–76	Doc	Chuck Bogert	2 episodes
1976–77	Monster Squad	Walter	13 episodes
1977	Quincy, M.E.	Milt Jordan	Episode: "...The Thigh Bone's Connected to the Knee Bone..."
1977	Welcome Back, Kotter	Andy	Episode: "Radio Free Freddie"
1977	Fernwood 2 Night	Dr. Alexander Beach	Episode: "Barbershop Trio"
1977–86	The Love Boat	Burl "Gopher" Smith	246 episodes
1977	The Lincoln Conspiracy	David Herold	Feature film
1978	Fantasy Island	Bernie Parker	Episode: "The Appointment/Mr. Tattoo"
1979	Fantasy Island	Jerry Burton	Episode: "The Comic/The Golden Hour"
1979	Blind Ambition	Donald Segretti	TV miniseries
1979	Charlie's Angels	Burl "Gopher" Smith	Episode: "Love Boat Angels"
1979	Fantasy Island	Bernie Drexel	Episode: "The Pug/Class of '69"
1983	Matt Houston	Ted Baer	Episode: "The Showgirl Murders"
1984	Cagney & Lacey	Richard White	Episode: "Matinee"
2003	Law & Order	Neil Skinner	Episode: "B*tch"
2014–17	The Mindy Project	Dr. William Ledreau	9 episodes
2017	General Hospital	Father Corey	2 episodes
2017	Great News	Fred	Episode: "Award Show"
2018–19	Knight Squad	Wizard Hogancross	5 episodes
2019	Play the Flute	Pastor Lawrence	
2021	Side Hustle	Mr. Grieves	Episode: "The Kid-Ding Dongs"
2022	Sprung	Horace Tackleberry	

U.S. House of Representatives
Preceded by Berkley Bedell	Member of the U.S. House of Representatives from Iowa's 6th congressional district 1987–1993	Constituency abolished
Preceded by Jim Ross Lightfoot	Member of the U.S. House of Representatives from Iowa's 5th congressional district 1993–1995	Succeeded by Tom Latham
U.S. order of precedence (ceremonial)
Preceded by Filemon Vela Jr. as Former U.S. Representative	Order of precedence of the United States as Former U.S. Representative	Succeeded by Greg Ganske as Former U.S. Representative
