= Wiley Mayne =

American politician (1917–2007)

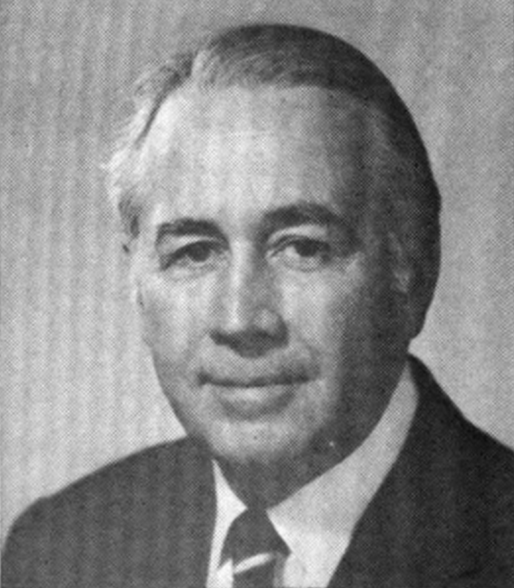

Member of the U.S. House of Representatives from Iowa's 6th district
- In office January 3, 1967 – January 3, 1975
- Preceded by: Stanley L. Greigg
- Succeeded by: Berkley Bedell

Personal details
- Born: January 19, 1917 Sanborn, Iowa, U.S.
- Died: May 27, 2007 (aged 90) Sioux City, Iowa, U.S.
- Party: Republican
- Spouse: Betty Mayne
- Education: Harvard College (BS); University of Iowa (JD)
- Profession: Lawyer

Military service
- Allegiance: United States of America
- Branch/service: United States Navy Reserve
- Years of service: 1941–1943
- Rank: Lieutenant Junior Grade

Wiley Mayne (January 19, 1917 – May 27, 2007) was an American attorney who served as a four-term Republican United States Congressman from Iowa's 6th congressional district. He was one of several Republican members of the House Judiciary Committee who were defeated in the fall of 1974 after he voted against resolutions to impeach President Richard M. Nixon in the summer of 1974.

== Personal life ==
Mayne was born in Sanborn, Iowa, on January 19, 1917. After attending public school in Iowa, Mayne studied at Harvard College, where he received his B.S. and then continued on to Harvard Law School. In 1939, he received his J.D. from the University of Iowa College of Law. He joined the Federal Bureau of Investigation in 1941, the same year that he was admitted to practice law. After a three-year tour of duty with the United States Naval Reserve as a lieutenant junior grade from 1941 to 1943, Mayne returned to private practice, joining a Sioux City, Iowa, law firm. In 1963, he served a one-year term as president of the Iowa Bar Association. Afterwards, he chaired the Grievance Commission of the Iowa Supreme Court until 1966.

On January 5, 1942, Mayne married Betty Dodson. The couple had three children; sons Wiley Mayne II and John Mayne, both of whom followed in their father's footsteps and became lawyers, and daughter Martha Mayne Smith.

== Congressional terms ==
In 1966, Mayne ran for Congress in the now-obsolete Sixth Congressional District in Northwest Iowa and defeated Democratic freshman incumbent Stanley L. Greigg. Mayne was elected four times to the House, where he served on the House Agriculture Committee and the House Judiciary Committee. While serving on the House Agriculture Committee, a major issue of the era was a sudden and swift decline in the United States cattle market. In 1973, he was made a delegate to the Food and Agriculture Organization in Rome. One of Mayne's Congressional aides was future actor and congressman Fred Grandy.

=== Defeat ===
As a member of the House Judiciary Committee, Mayne played an influential role in amendments to the Federal Rules of Evidence, especially those involving the admissibility of opinion testimony. His political downfall, however, came in his fourth term during his service on that Committee, when Mayne was one of ten Republican Committee members to vote against articles of impeachment against President Richard Nixon arising from the Watergate scandal. At the time of his Committee votes, Mayne believed that the proof was not sufficient to necessitate a call for impeachment. In Nixon's final days in office, however, Mayne's opinion quickly changed after evidence implicating Nixon in a subsequent coverup was made public, and he vowed to vote in favor of impeachment when the articles came before the full House. The damage, however, had been done, and Mayne lost the 1974 election to his 1972 opponent, Democrat Berkley Bedell 54.6% to 45.4%.

== Later life ==
After leaving Congress, Mayne returned to Sioux City, Iowa, to resume his law practice. His wife, Betty, died in 2001, and Mayne continued to practice law until 2005. Mayne died in May 2007 after suffering a cardiopulmonary incident.

U.S. House of Representatives
Preceded by Stanley L. Greigg	Member of the U.S. House of Representatives from Iowa's 6th congressional district 1967–1975 (obsolete district)	Succeeded by Berkley Bedell
