= Robert K. Goodwin =

American politician (1905–1983)

Robert Kingman Goodwin

Member of the U.S. House of Representatives from Iowa's 6th district
- In office March 5, 1940 – January 3, 1941
- Preceded by: Cassius C. Dowell
- Succeeded by: Paul Cunningham

Personal details
- Born: May 23, 1905 Des Moines, Iowa, U.S.
- Died: February 21, 1983 (aged 77) Rochester, Minnesota, U.S.
- Resting place: Resthaven, Des Moines, Iowa, U.S.
- Party: Republican
- Education: Drake University; George Washington University

Robert Kingman Goodwin (May 23, 1905 – February 21, 1983) was a Republican U.S. Representative from Iowa from a March 1940 special election until the end of his term in January 1941.

Born in Des Moines, Iowa, Goodwin attended the public schools. He graduated from Drake University, Des Moines, Iowa, in 1928 and later attended the law school of George Washington University, Washington, D.C. He moved to Redfield, Iowa, in 1929 and engaged in the brick and tile manufacturing business and farming from 1934 to 1949. He served as mayor of Redfield, Iowa from 1938 to 1940. He was also a delegate to the Republican State conventions in 1936 and 1938, and vice president of the Dallas County Farm Bureau in 1939 and 1940.

On March 5, 1940, Goodwin was elected as a Republican to the Seventy-sixth Congress to fill the vacancy caused by the death of Cassius C. Dowell. He was not a candidate for renomination in 1940, although a cadre of supporters attempted to draft him to break a deadlock in the nominating convention.

Upon his return from Congress, Goodwin resumed his manufacturing business. After the United States became involved in World War II, he was commissioned a lieutenant in the United States Naval Reserve in June 1942 and served until November 2, 1945. He was a civilian aide to the Secretary of the Army from 1952 to 1956.

He also served as director of the Central National Bank and Trust Co. from 1941 to 1965, a delegate to the Republican National Convention in 1952, a member of the Republican National Committee from 1952 to 1956, and a trustee and vice president of Herbert Hoover Foundation, Inc.

He was a resident of Des Moines until his death in Rochester, Minnesota on February 21, 1983. He was interred in Resthaven, Des Moines.

U.S. House of Representatives
Preceded by Cassius C. Dowell	Member of the U.S. House of Representatives from Iowa's 6th congressional district March 5, 1940 (special election) – January 3, 1941 (obsolete district)	Succeeded by Paul Cunningham
