= Jackson Orr =

American politician (1832–1926)

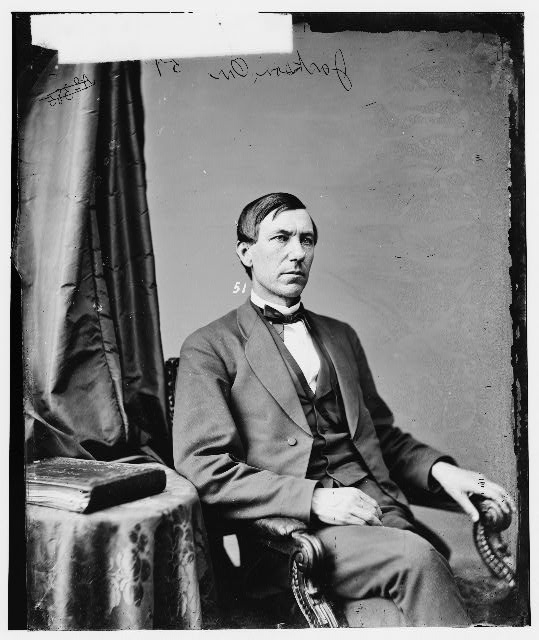

Member of the U.S. House of Representatives from Iowa's 6th district
- In office March 4, 1871 – March 3, 1873
- Preceded by: Charles Pomeroy
- Succeeded by: William Loughridge

Personal details
- Born: September 21, 1832 Washington Court House, Ohio, U.S.
- Died: March 15, 1926 (aged 93) Denver, Colorado, U.S
- Party: Republican
- Education: Indiana University

Military service
- Branch/service: Union Army
- Rank: Captain
- Unit: Company H, 10th Iowa Infantry Regiment
- Battles/wars: Civil War

Jackson Orr (September 21, 1832 – March 15, 1926) was a lawyer, Civil War officer, businessman, and two-term Republican U.S. Representative from western Iowa. Continuing westward, he spent the last five decades of his life in Colorado.

Born at Washington Court House, Ohio, Orr moved with his parents to Benton, Indiana, in 1836. He attended the common schools and Indiana University at Bloomington. He moved to Jefferson, Iowa, in 1856. He studied law and was admitted to the bar. From 1861 to 1863, he served in the Union Army as captain of Company H, 10th Iowa Volunteer Infantry Regiment . He engaged in mercantile pursuits in the City of Montana (now Boone), Iowa, and served as member of the Iowa House of Representatives in 1868. That year, (when Iowa had six seats in the U.S. House), he fell two votes short of winning the Republican nomination to represent Iowa's 6th congressional district.

In 1870 Orr won the Republican nomination, and was elected to represent the 6th district in the 42nd United States Congress. Based on the 1870 census, Iowa received three more seats in the House, and Orr's home county was then included in Iowa's new 9th congressional district. Running in the new district, Orr won election to the 43rd United States Congress, where he chaired the Committee on Expenditures in the Department of the Interior. He served in Congress from March 4, 1871, to March 3, 1875.

Orr was not a candidate for renomination in 1874, but instead moved to Silverton, a mining town in a newly opened area of southwestern Colorado Territory, in 1875.

In Colorado, Orr was elected county judge and served for three years. He moved to Denver, Colorado, and engaged in the practice of his profession and also in the real estate business. In 1882, President Chester A. Arthur appointed him as one of three commissioners to implement a treaty between the United States and the Ute tribe. He was an unsuccessful candidate for the Republican nomination for Colorado's at-large Congressional seat in 1884. He served as president of the Denver Fire and Police Board in 1893 and 1894.

He died in Denver on March 15, 1926. He was interred in Fairmount Cemetery in Denver.

U.S. House of Representatives
Preceded by Charles Pomeroy	Member of the U.S. House of Representatives from Iowa's 6th congressional district 1871–1873	Succeeded by William Loughridge
Preceded by District created	Member of the U.S. House of Representatives from Iowa's 9th congressional district 1873–1875	Succeeded by S. Addison Oliver
