= Berkley Bedell =

American politician

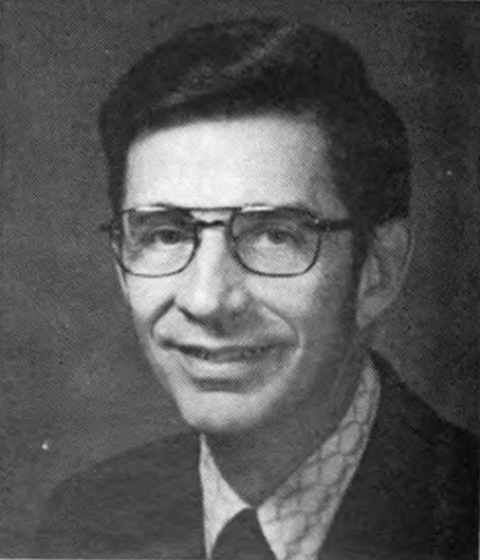

Member of the U.S. House of Representatives from Iowa's 6th district
- In office January 3, 1975 – January 3, 1987
- Preceded by: Wiley Mayne
- Succeeded by: Fred Grandy

Personal details
- Born: Berkley Warren Bedell; March 5, 1921 Spirit Lake, Iowa, U.S.
- Died: December 7, 2019 (aged 98) Naples, Florida, U.S.
- Party: Democratic
- Spouse: Elinor Healy (m. 1943; died 2017)
- Children: 3
- Education: Iowa State University
- Profession: Businessman

Military service
- Allegiance: United States
- Branch/service: United States Army
- Years of service: 1942–1945
- Rank: First lieutenant
- Battles/wars: World War II

Berkley Warren Bedell (March 5, 1921 – December 7, 2019) was an American Democratic Party politician and businessman who served as the U.S. representative for Iowa's 6th congressional district from 1975 to 1987. After starting a successful business in his youth, Berkley Fly Co., he ran for Congress in 1972, but was defeated by incumbent Wiley Mayne. In 1974 however, Bedell beat Mayne and was elected to the U.S. House.

He was known for his support of representative democracy and his populist style. For example, he would hold town halls and let constituents vote on motions to decide what he would do in Congress on their behalf and these meetings helped Bedell understand the problems of his constituents; as a result, he backed issues that were important to his farming constituency, such as waterway usage fees and production constraints.

Bedell did not seek reelection in 1986 after contracting Lyme disease from a tick bite. Though no longer serving in Congress, he remained active in Iowa politics, strongly supporting Howard Dean in 2004 over John Kerry. In the 2008 presidential election, he met several times with Chris Dodd, but ultimately endorsed Barack Obama.

== Early life ==
Bedell was born in Spirit Lake, Iowa, the son of Virginia Viola (Price) and Walter Berkley Bedell. Bedell was educated in Spirit Lake public schools. He graduated from Spirit Lake High School in 1939, where he earned spending money with a business in the midst of the Great Depression. His business involved braiding dog hairs around fishhooks, the result of which could be sold as fish flies. He began tying the fly-fishing lures in his bedroom, then he moved the business into his parents' basement. In time, he got space above a grocery store to continue the business full-time.

After graduating from high school, he attended Iowa State University from 1940 to 1942, where he met fellow ISU student Elinor Healy (March 9, 1923 – March 2, 2017) from Saint Paul, Minnesota. Berkley and Elinor married in Minneapolis on August 29, 1943, and their son Kenneth was born in 1947, Thomas in 1950 and daughter Joanne in 1952. While studying at Iowa State, Berkley joined the Iowa Gamma chapter of Phi Delta Theta fraternity. Berkley's college and personal life was interrupted in 1942 when he joined the army. He served in the United States Army as first lieutenant and flight trainer from 1942 to 1945. When he got back, he began to garner success from his fishing tackle business. His business became larger, with hundreds of employees and international operations; he had become a millionaire by the 1960s. He served as member of the Spirit Lake Board of Education from 1957 to 1962.

== Political career ==
=== Running for Congress ===
By the early 1970s, Bedell had decided to run for political office. In 1972, he ran against Wiley Mayne, a Republican incumbent in Iowa's 6th congressional district. Mayne was a staunch supporter of Richard Nixon and secured victory along with the President in a year favorable to the Republicans. Mayne, however, would politically suffer after Watergate (he was one of only a few Republicans to vote against impeaching the President on the judiciary committee.) The damage had already been done, and Bedell defeated Mayne in a 1974 rematch.

During his time at Congress, Bedell took efforts to uphold representative democracy. He held town halls regularly with his constituents, and he would let them vote on motions to decide what he would do in Congress on their behalf. This type of communication told Bedell of the types of issues affecting his farming constituency. Thus, though Bedell had not farmed in his life, he would take steps in Congress to benefit farmers.

=== Waterway usage fees ===
Bedell sponsored several bold initiatives during his tenure in the United States House of Representatives. One initiative, which came from his constituents' problems with the barge industry, focused on waterway usage fees. He introduced legislation in 1977 that would require the barge industry to pay a fee for using the waterways which, Bedell pointed out, the Government paid millions of dollars to create and maintain. Bedell's original plan set the rate the barge industry paid as directly related to the amount the Government spent on waterway projects. This would have the additional effect of helping curb unnecessary waterway projects, and it was the same plan proposed by Pete Domenici in the Senate.

Congress eventually passed a watered-down version of the original plan put forward by Bedell and Senator Pete Domenici. The compromise version enacted a tax on the gasoline barges used and put it into a "trust" for waterway projects. While other supporters of waterway usage fees, including Domenici, backed the compromise, Bedell gave a passioned plea for his colleagues to oppose it. He viewed it as lacking a crucial element of the original plan – that of capital recovery. The trust was optional, and the Government could spend money on waterway projects irrespective of the trust. The compromise was eventually signed by Jimmy Carter. Bedell's original plan never made it through the House of Representatives, but he continued to introduce it in succeeding sessions. It would not, however, get a floor vote in succeeding sessions.

=== Farming issues ===
In 1985, Bedell put forward an agricultural plan that he thought would increase production controls for farmers, thus raising prices for crops. This plan, backed by labor unions and certain Democrats, passed the Agriculture Committee as an amendment to farm legislation. It mandated a referendum that would then be used to determine what types of production controls to enact. The purpose of this plan was twofold: production controls would decrease the aggregate supply of crops, thus making individual crops cost more (which would benefit farmers, who were in the middle of an acute debt crisis). Second, by styling it as a referendum, the farmers would get to decide the severity of the controls.

On the other hand, opponents of the Bedell plan had a very different view of this legislation. Representatives such as Pat Roberts claimed that the referendum was redundant because the farmers already voted the politicians into office, and this bill was an example of the politicians not doing their jobs. The Reagan Administration opposed the bill because of their opposition to production controls, and the President threatened to veto the farm bill if Bedell's plan was left in place. When the bill got to the floor, an amendment was proposed to strike this provision, and it was passed 251–174.

=== Investigations of large businesses ===
While in Congress, Bedell was Chairman of the Small Business Subcommittee, and he used this position to investigate underselling on the part of large oil companies. He also claimed that certain large oil companies underpaid their "windfall taxes" in certain cases and wanted to pass legislation to increase regulations on these corporations.

In these investigations, Bedell quickly gained the support of small gasoline marketers and Congressman Bill Nelson. The chief target, ARCO, was accused of not paying all of its taxes on Alaskan crude oil. In the end, the government tried to make a case against ARCO, but it was eventually dropped in 1985. Bedell used this opportunity to attack the Administration for "not caring" about small business owners, and he advocated that Governmental agencies put aside 1–3% of their research and development money for small businesses.

=== Disagreement with Reagan ===
In late 1982, Congress passed a law which forbade the United States from funding groups aiming to overthrow the Sandinista government of Nicaragua. Then, in 1983, Bedell visited Nicaragua and Honduras along with Representative Robert G. Torricelli. During the trip, Bedell spoke with soldiers, generals, governmental officials and members of the contras. His conclusion at the end of the trip was that Ronald Reagan was aiding the Contras in violation of federal law. He promised to hold hearings after returning to Congress. Bedell would later join other House Democrats in demanding documents from the White House related to the contras, but the Reagan Administration refused to provide them. Bedell became angrier with the Reagan Administration as the decade wore on. He called his Central American policies "sheer lunacy", saying that the mining of harbors was an act of war. Bedell would retire from Congress before Reagan's actions in Central America would culminate with the Iran–Contra Affair.

Bedell was a sharp critic of Reagan's agricultural policies, calling for John Block to resign after calling his agricultural plan a failure that was "dead on arrival" in both the House and the Senate. Reagan's agricultural plan consisted primarily of a gradual reduction in farm subsidies. He also attacked the Department of Agriculture for "looking backward" when it dismissed the only expert on organic farming. Also, as chairman of the subcommittee on Department Operations, Research and Foreign Agriculture, which was in charge of regulating USDA operations, he opposed the proposals Reagan had for reforming the organization. The proposals generally involved shifting costs for meat inspections and other USDA duties from the federal government to the industry.

=== Alleged customs violations by Berkley and Co. ===
In 1981, it was revealed in internal memos that Bedell may have known about potential customs violations that his company Berkley and Co. engaged in. It asserted that Bedell had gone to Taiwan in 1973 to discuss "prior violations of customs law" in regard to the sale of fishing rods from the company's Taiwan subsidiary. Bedell responded by denying any wrongdoing, saying that he has not been personally involved in the company in years. In the end, no charges were levied against him, and he was reelected after the story was published.

== After politics ==
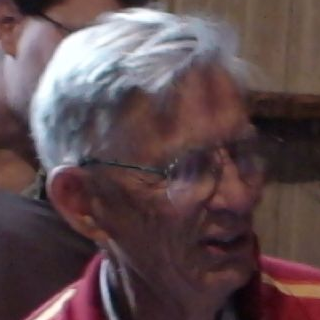
Bedell in 2007

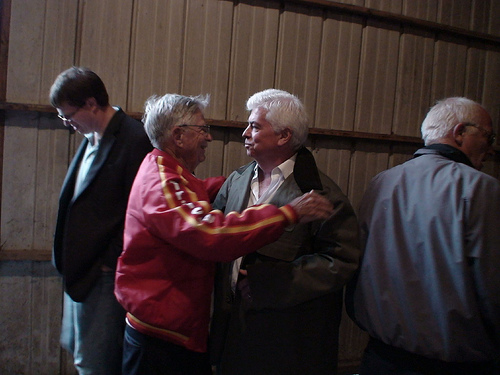
On May 22, 2007, Chris Dodd met with Bedell at the Kibbie Farm in Emmetsburg, Iowa.

Bedell decided not to seek reelection in 1986 after contracting Lyme disease from a tick bite. Afterward, he founded a center for alternative medicine and was a noted advocate of health freedom. Due largely to his friendship with Tom Harkin, he remained an important political figure in Iowa, with politicians such as Howard Dean meeting him in their trips to the state. Also, the Elinor Bedell State Park was established in 1998 on land donated by Berkley and Elinor Bedell. The park is named after the Congressman's wife.

As an opponent of the Vietnam War, Bedell signed a petition urging against United States military intervention in Iraq. This petition was signed with the names of 70 former Congressmen from the 1970s and was presented in a press conference on March 15, 2003. Bedell said that it was unbelievable for the United States to settle disputes with war, and he said that an Iraq war would be similar to the Vietnam War.

In the 2004 presidential election, Bedell attacked John Kerry for voting for Newt Gingrich's Freedom to Farm Act, which Bedell said wrecked the farm program. Bedell would later officially endorse Howard Dean's candidacy. For the 2008 election, Bedell met with Chris Dodd.

In the 2020 Democratic presidential primary, Bedell endorsed Senator Elizabeth Warren.

Bedell was a member of the ReFormers Caucus of Issue One.

Bedell died in Naples, Florida, on December 7, 2019, at age 98, from complications of a stroke he suffered three days earlier.

== Peace Harbor ==
Built in 2004, Peace Harbor is Tom and Molly Bedell's former 25,000 square foot home on 1.26 acres with 178 feet of West Lake Okoboji shoreline near Spirit Lake, Iowa. (Note: Tom Bedell is Berkley Bedell's son and ran the Berkley Bedell founded firm Pure Fishing for thirty years until the company was purchased by Jarden Corporation for $400 million in 2007.) It has a master wing, fifteen bathrooms, eight bedrooms all facing the lake, six garages, an indoor entertainment stage overlooking the water, a gathering room with a Brazilian blue marble floor and seating for over a hundred, a master retreat, master retreat bathroom, receiving room, conference room and private office with sweeping views of West Lake Okoboji, a commercial caterers kitchen, guest suite with its own bar, caretaker suite, caretaker suite kitchen, exercise room, upper level art studio, a movie theater with its own Lakeland Theatre Concession stand, and a large Irish Pub known as Kevin O'Sullivan's Pub. In June 2021, it listed for $9.9 million and was one of the most expensive homes in Iowa.

== Notes ==
U.S. House of Representatives
Preceded by Wiley Mayne	Member of the U.S. House of Representatives from Iowa's 6th congressional district 1975–1987	Succeeded by Fred Grandy
