= Asahel W. Hubbard =

American politician

Asahel Hubbard
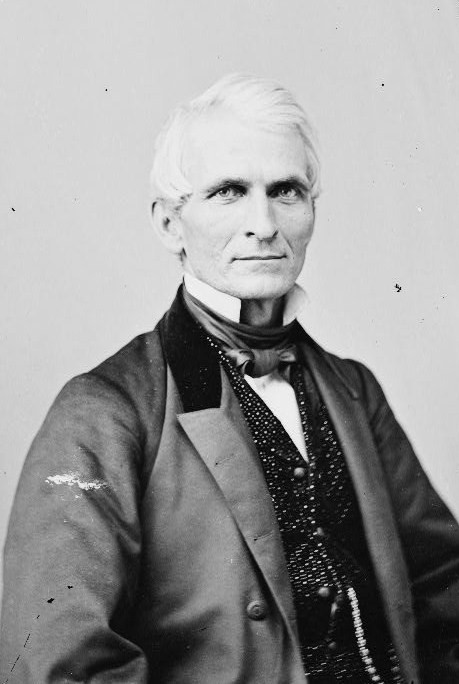

Member of the U.S. House of Representatives from Iowa's 6th district
- In office March 4, 1863 – March 3, 1869
- Preceded by: District created
- Succeeded by: Charles Pomeroy

Member of the Indiana House of Representatives
- In office 1847–1849

Personal details
- Born: Asahel Wheeler Hubbard; January 19, 1819 Haddam, Connecticut, U.S.
- Died: September 22, 1879 (aged 60) Sioux City, Iowa, U.S.
- Children: Elbert H. Hubbard

Asahel Wheeler Hubbard (January 19, 1819 – September 22, 1879) was an American attorney, businessman, politician, and jurist who served as the U.S. representative for Iowa's 6th congressional district from 1863 to 1869.

== Early life and education ==
Born in Haddam, Connecticut, Hubbard attended local public schools. He also pursued his studies at a select school in Middletown, Connecticut.

== Career ==
Hubbard began his career as a stonecutter. He moved to Rushville, Indiana, in 1838, where he was employed as a book agent and taught school. He studied law, was admitted to the bar in 1841 and commenced practice in Rushville. He served as member of the Indiana House of Representatives from 1847 to 1849.

In 1857, he moved to Sioux City, Iowa, and engaged in the real estate business. He served as judge of the fourth judicial district from 1859 to 1862.

In 1862, after the 1860 United States census caused Iowa's seats in the U.S. House to increase from two to six, Hubbard became the first Congressman to represent Iowa's 6th congressional district. Re-elected twice, he served in the Thirty-eighth, Thirty-ninth, and Fortieth Congresses. He was influential in securing legislation which hastened the building of several lines of railroad through his district, besides securing to Sioux City a branch of the Union Pacific Railroad. He was not a candidate for renomination in 1868. In all, he served in Congress from March 4, 1863, to March 3, 1869.

Hubbard was one of the organizers of the First National Bank of Sioux City in 1871, and served as its president until January 15, 1879. He also had interests in railroad building in Iowa and in a mining property in Leadville, Colorado.

== Personal life ==
He was the father of Iowa Congressman Elbert H. Hubbard. He died in Sioux City on September 22, 1879. He was interred in Floyd Cemetery.

In 1880, Hubbard, Nebraska, was named in honor of Asahel W. Hubbard.
