= Cassius C. Dowell =

American politician (1864–1940)

Cassius Clay Dowell
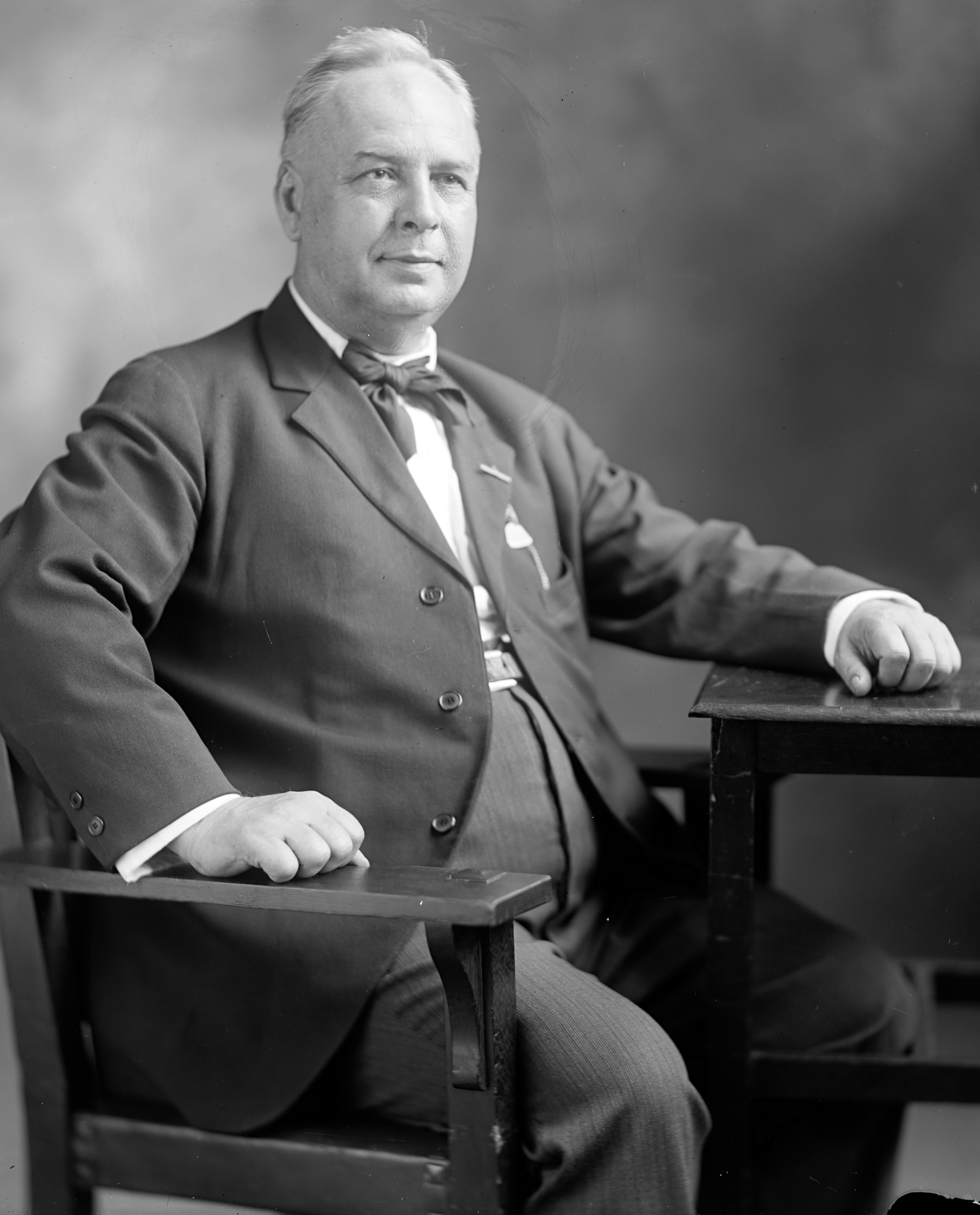

Member of the U.S. House of Representatives from Iowa
- In office March 4, 1915 – January 3, 1935
- Preceded by: Solomon F. Prouty (7th); C. William Ramseyer (6th)
- Succeeded by: Otha Wearin (7th); Hubert Utterback (6th)
- Constituency: 7th district (1915-33); 6th district (1933-35)
- In office January 3, 1937 – February 4, 1940
- Preceded by: Hubert Utterback
- Succeeded by: Robert K. Goodwin
- Constituency: 6th district

Personal details
- Born: February 29, 1864 Near Summerset, Warren County, Iowa, U.S.
- Died: February 4, 1940 (aged 75) Washington, D.C., U.S.
- Party: Republican
- Education: Drake University

Cassius Clay Dowell (February 29, 1864 – February 4, 1940) was a Republican U.S. representative from Iowa. He served from 1915 to 1935, and again from 1937 until his death in 1940, with the interregnum caused by an unsuccessful campaign for reelection in 1934.

== Biography ==
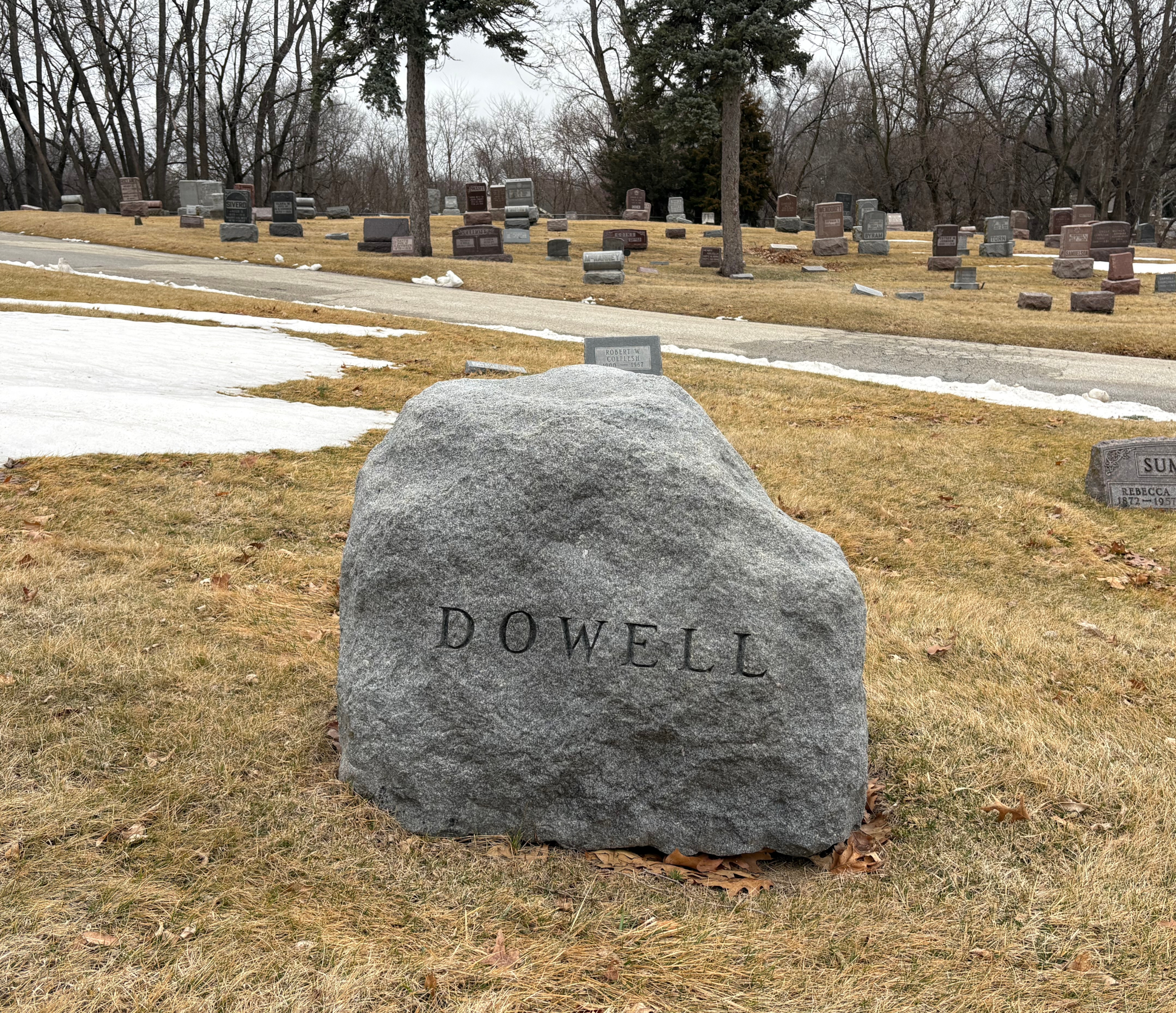
Dowell's grave at Glendale Cemetery

Born on a farm near the unincorporated town of Summerset, Iowa (in Warren County, near Indianola) Dowell attended the public schools, Baptist College in Des Moines, Iowa, and Simpson College in Indianola, Iowa. In 1886, he graduated from the liberal arts department of Drake University in Des Moines, Iowa, and graduated from Drake University Law School the following year. He was admitted to the bar in 1888 and commenced practice in Des Moines.

From 1894 to 1898, Dowell served as member of the Iowa State House of Representatives. He served in the Iowa State Senate from 1902 to 1912.

In 1914, Dowell was elected as a Republican to represent Iowa's 7th congressional district. He was re-elected to this seat eight times, until reapportionment between 1930 and 1932 moved his home county into Iowa's 6th congressional district, prompting him to run for the seat in that district. He won the 1932 race by more than 13,000 votes, surviving the Roosevelt landslide. Yet he was surprised two years later, when former Iowa Supreme Court Justice Hubert Utterback upset him by over 4,000 votes. He had served nearly twenty years, in the Sixty-fourth and the nine succeeding Congresses (March 4, 1915 – January 3, 1935). He had served as chairman of the Committee on Elections (in the Sixty-sixth and Sixty-seventh Congresses), and on the Committee on Roads (in the Sixty-eighth through Seventy-first Congresses).

Dowell returned to Des Moines to practice law, and reclaimed his seat two years later in 1936, when Utterbeck ran unsuccessfully for the U.S. Senate. Utterbeck tried to regain his House in 1938, but Dowell defeated him decisively.

Dowell filed for re-election in the 1940 race, but died due to heart disease in Washington, D.C., on February 4, 1940. He was interred in Glendale Cemetery, Des Moines, Iowa.

In reporting his death, an Iowa newspaper reported that "only rarely did he participate in house debate but his influence upon legislation was strong. He was instrumental in securing veterans' hospitals for Des Moines and Knoxville, in the establishment of Camp Dodge during wartime, and in the erection of an $800,000 federal building on Des Moines' waterfront."

After his death, Republican Robert K. Goodwin won the special election to complete his term, and Republican Paul Cunningham won the 1940 general election for a full term.

== See also ==
- List of members of the United States Congress who died in office (1900–1949)

U.S. House of Representatives
Preceded by Solomon F. Prouty	Member of the U.S. House of Representatives from Iowa's 7th congressional district 1915 – 1933	Succeeded by Otha Wearin
Preceded by C. William Ramseyer	Member of the U.S. House of Representatives from Iowa's 6th congressional district 1933 – 1935 (obsolete district)	Succeeded by Hubert Utterback
Preceded by Hubert Utterback	Member of the U.S. House of Representatives from Iowa's 6th congressional district 1937 – February 4, 1940 (obsolete district)	Succeeded by Robert K. Goodwin
