= C. William Ramseyer =

American politician (1875–1943)

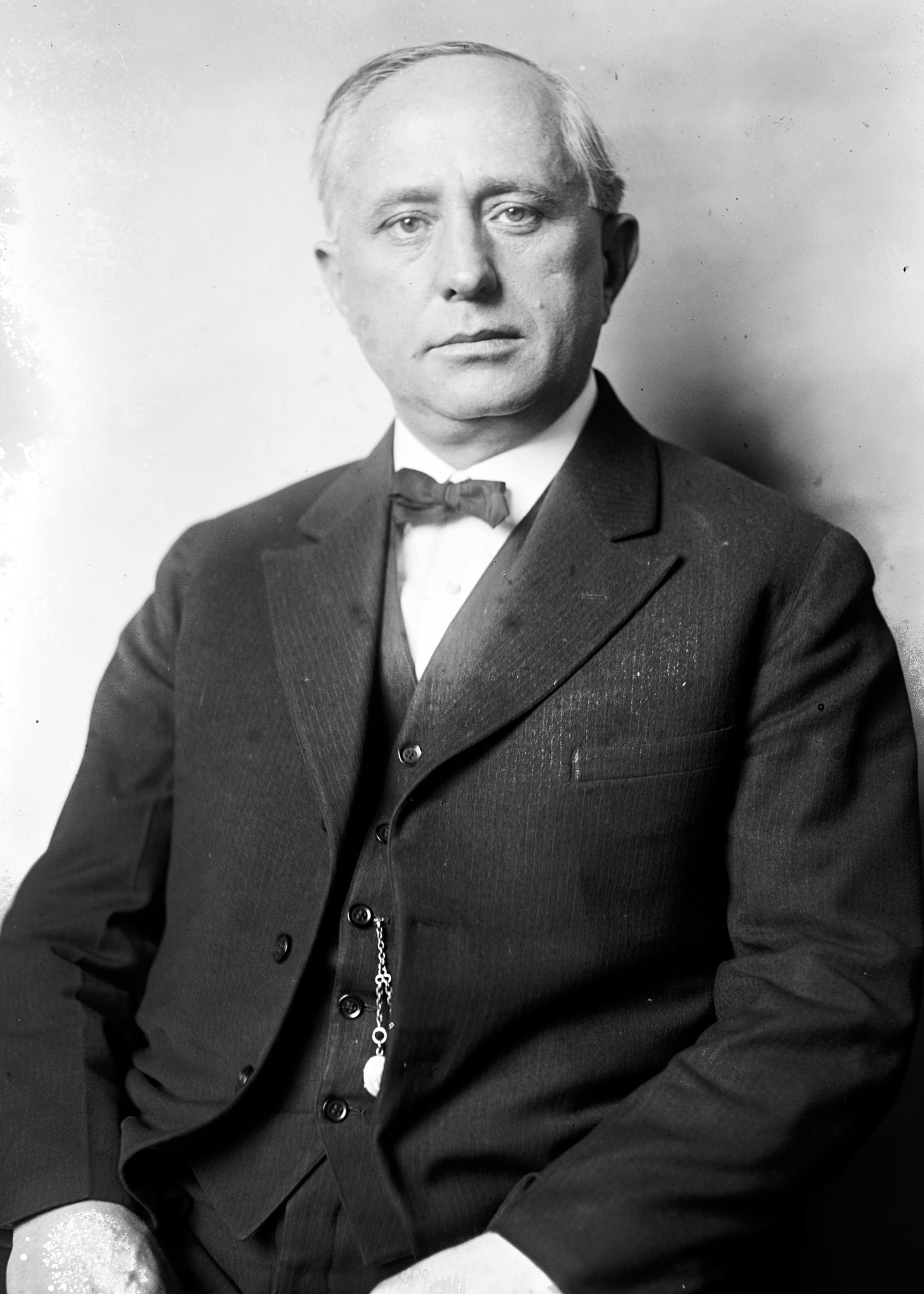
- Ramseyer, 1918–1921

Member of the U.S. House of Representatives from Iowa's 6th district
- In office March 4, 1915 – March 3, 1933
- Preceded by: Sanford Kirkpatrick
- Succeeded by: Cassius C. Dowell

Personal details
- Born: Christian William Ramseyer; March 13, 1875 Collinsville, Ohio, U.S.
- Died: November 1, 1943 (aged 68) Washington, D.C., U.S
- Party: Republican
- Education: Iowa State Teachers College

Christian William Ramseyer (March 13, 1875 – November 1, 1943) was a nine-term Republican U.S. Representative from Iowa's 6th congressional district.

== Biography ==
He was born on March 13, 1875, near Collinsville, Ohio. Ramseyer moved to Davis County, Iowa, in 1887 and settled near Pulaski. He attended the public schools. He graduated from the Southern Iowa Normal School in 1897 and from Iowa State Teachers College, Cedar Falls, Iowa, in 1902. He taught school for nine years, and was principal and later superintendent of the Bloomfield High School in Bloomfield, Iowa. He was graduated from the University of Iowa College of Law in 1906. He was admitted to the bar the same year and commenced the practice of law in Bloomfield. He served as prosecuting attorney of Davis County from 1911 to 1915.

In 1914, Ramseyer was elected as a Republican to the Sixty-fourth Congress. He was re-elected eight consecutive times. However, in 1931, Iowa lost two congressional seats, and the resulting reapportionment placed Ramseyer and former 8th congressional district congressman Lloyd Thurston in the same district (Iowa's 5th congressional district). In 1932 the two incumbents opposed each other for the Republican nomination for that district, but Thurston prevailed in the primary. In all, Ramseyer served in the House from March 4, 1915, to March 3, 1933.

After his defeat, he served as commissioner for the United States Court of Claims from 1933 until his death in Washington, D.C., on November 1, 1943. He was interred in Odd Fellows Cemetery in Bloomfield.

== Legacy ==
Congressman Ramseyer originated what is now known as the Ramseyer Rule (Clause 3(e) of Rule XIII of the Standing Rules of the United States House of Representatives) that requires bills to show exactly how a bill would change existing law. Bills reported out of full House committees now include 'Ramseyering' which shows repealed or deleted portions of existing law surrounded in boldface brackets, and new additions to law shown in italic typeface. These conventions have been adopted by many other legislative bodies. A Ramseyer document shows only those provisions of existing federal statutes which are amended by the bill (as reported) and is included in the House report filed by the full committee.

U.S. House of Representatives
Preceded by Sanford Kirkpatrick	Member of the U.S. House of Representatives from Iowa's 6th congressional district 1915 – 1933 (obsolete district)	Succeeded by Cassius C. Dowell
