= Sanford Kirkpatrick =

American politician

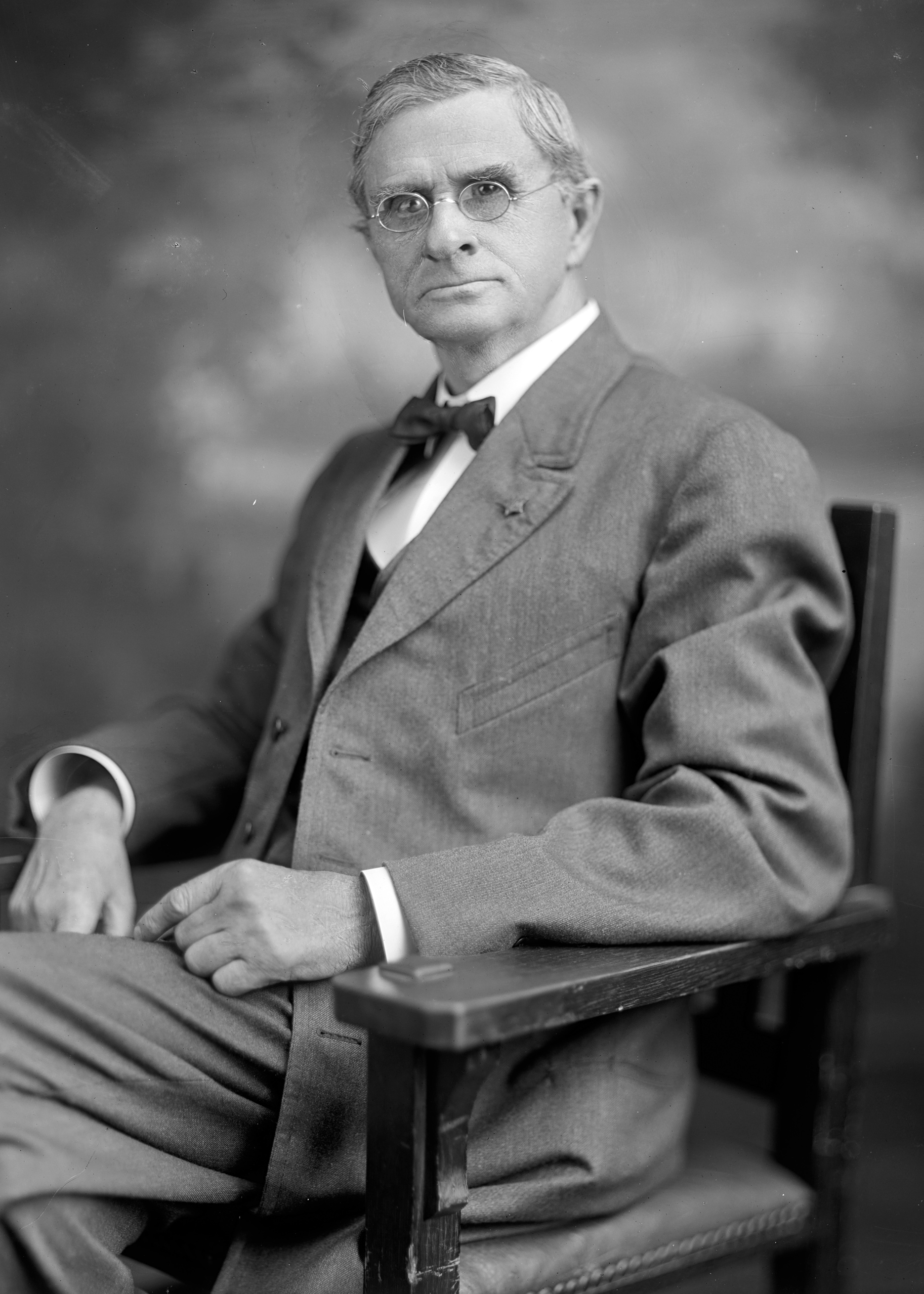

Member of the U.S. House of Representatives from Iowa's 6th district
- In office March 4, 1913 – March 3, 1915
- Preceded by: Nathan E. Kendall
- Succeeded by: C. William Ramseyer

Personal details
- Born: February 11, 1842 London, Ohio, U.S.
- Died: February 13, 1932 (aged 90) Greensboro, North Carolina, U.S
- Party: Republican
- Other political affiliations: Greenback (1883)

Military service
- Branch/service: Union Army
- Rank: First lieutenant
- Unit: 2nd Iowa Infantry Regiment
- Battles/wars: Civil War; Battle of Fort Donelson; Battle of Shiloh; Second Battle of Corinth

Sanford "Sant" Kirkpatrick (February 11, 1842 – February 13, 1932) was a revenue agent and a one-term Democratic U.S. representative from Iowa's 6th congressional district. He was the last Civil War veteran elected to represent Iowa in Congress. Elected in 1912 to a historically Republican district in a year in which Bull Moose Party and Republican Party supporters split the Republican vote, Kirkpatrick failed to win renomination two years later.

Born near London, Ohio, at age seven Kirkpatrick moved to Iowa in 1849 with his parents, who settled on a farm in Highland Township, Wapello County. He attended the common schools until 1858. During the Civil War, Kirkpatrick entered the Union Army as a private in the Second Regiment, Iowa Volunteer Infantry, and was promoted to first lieutenant. He served four years and four months, and fought at the Battle of Fort Donelson, Battle of Shiloh and Second Battle of Corinth. Following the war, he returned to Wapello County to farm.

Kirkpatrick moved to Ottumwa, Iowa, in 1876 and engaged in mercantile pursuits until 1887. He also served as deputy recorder of Wapello County between 1876 and 1880, and as a member of the Ottumwa City Council from 1884 to 1887.

Kirkpatrick was the Greenback Party's nominee for Lieutenant Governor of Iowa in 1883. He finished a distant third, behind Republican and Democratic candidates.

From 1887 to 1913, he served as an agent of the Internal Revenue Service, primarily in North Carolina and adjoining states. In his first few years as a revenue agent, he was "rendered blind" by a gunshot, as stated in a special bill passed by the U.S. Congress in 1890 to increase his Civil War pension. Newspaper reports from 1912 stated that he carried in his body more than twenty bullets and parts of bullets from the guns of moonshiners. His last four years with the agency were spent auditing banks and other corporations.

In 1912, the congressman for Iowa's 6th congressional district, Republican Nathan E. Kendall, declined to run for re-election. Kirkpatrick was nominated by the Democratic Party to run for the vacancy. Republicans complained that Kirkpatrick was a resident of North Carolina, rather than Iowa. His supporters responded that while he worked in the South as a revenue agent he had returned to Iowa every year to vote, and emphasized his service in the Iowa Infantry in the Civil War. In a three-way race, Kirkpatrick was elected, winning by 1,138 votes out of over 30,000 cast.

When running for renomination in the Democratic primary two years later, Kirkpatrick was defeated by W.H. Hamilton. Kirkpatrick ran again for his former seat in 1916. This time he won the Democratic nomination, but lost in the general election to incumbent Republican C. William Ramseyer. In all, Kirkpatrick served in Congress from March 4, 1913 to March 3, 1915.

He moved to Greensboro, North Carolina, in 1916 and engaged in agricultural pursuits. He died in Greensboro on February 13, 1932, two days after his 90th birthday. He was interred in Forest Lawn Cemetery in Greensboro.

U.S. House of Representatives
Preceded by Nathan E. Kendall	Member of the U.S. House of Representatives from Iowa's 6th congressional district 1913–1915	Succeeded by C. William Ramseyer
