= Charles Pomeroy =

American politician (1825–1891)

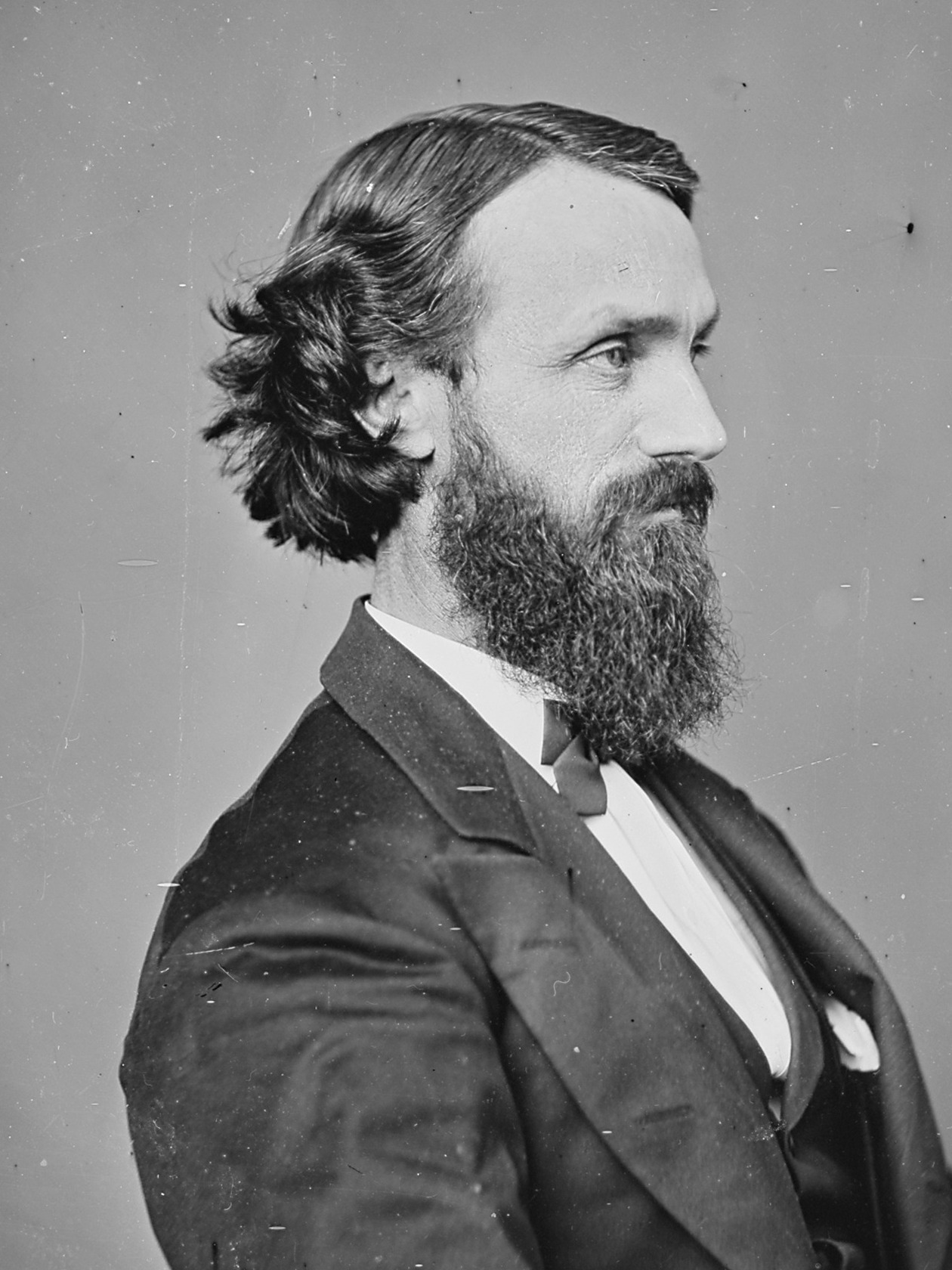

Member of the U.S. House of Representatives from Iowa's 6th district
- In office March 4, 1869 – March 3, 1871
- Preceded by: Asahel W. Hubbard
- Succeeded by: Jackson Orr

Personal details
- Born: September 3, 1825 Meriden, Connecticut, U.S.
- Died: February 11, 1891 (aged 65) Washington, D.C., U.S
- Party: Republican

Charles Pomeroy (September 3, 1825 – February 11, 1891) was a one-term Republican U.S. Representative from Iowa's 6th congressional district.

Born in Meriden, Connecticut, Pomeroy received an academic education. He studied and practiced law. He moved to Iowa in 1855, settling in the now-defunct community of Boonesboro, in Boone County. In addition to practicing law, he engaged in agricultural pursuits. An early Republican, in 1860 he was one of the presidential electors for Abraham Lincoln. He served as receiver of the United States land office at Fort Dodge, Iowa, from September 11, 1861, until March 3, 1869, when he resigned to serve in Congress.

In 1868, Pomeroy was elected as a Republican to represent Iowa's 6th congressional district in the U.S. House the Forty-first Congress. The Sixth District then encompassed the northwestern third of the state, extending from the Missouri River as far east as Waterloo and from the Minnesota state line as far south as Marshalltown. In 1870, he was an unsuccessful candidate for renomination, losing to Jackson Orr. In all, he served from March 4, 1869, to March 3, 1871.

He was a claim agent in Washington, D.C. until his death on February 11, 1891. He was interred in Oak Hill Cemetery.

The small town of Pomeroy, Iowa, in Calhoun County, Iowa, was named for him.

U.S. House of Representatives
Preceded by Asahel W. Hubbard	Member of the U.S. House of Representatives from Iowa's 6th congressional district 1869–1871	Succeeded by Jackson Orr
