= John C. Cook =

American politician (1846–1920)

John Calhoun Cook

Member of the U.S. House of Representatives from Iowa's 6th district
- In office March 3, 1883 – March 3, 1883
- Preceded by: Marsena E. Cutts
- Succeeded by: Marsena E. Cutts
- In office October 9, 1883 – March 3, 1885
- Preceded by: Marsena E. Cutts
- Succeeded by: James Weaver

Personal details
- Born: December 26, 1846 Seneca, Ohio, U.S.
- Died: June 7, 1920 (aged 73) Algona, Iowa, U.S.
- Resting place: Riverview Cemetery, Algona, Iowa, U.S.
- Party: Democratic
- Other political affiliations: Greenback

John Calhoun Cook (December 26, 1846 – June 7, 1920) was a 19th-century American politician, lawyer and judge from Iowa. He was twice elected to the U.S. House of Representatives from Iowa's 6th congressional district, each time under unusual circumstances.

Born in Seneca, Ohio, just two days before Iowa was admitted as a state, Cook attended common schools as a child, studied law and was admitted to the bar in 1867, commencing practice in Newton, Iowa. He was judge of the sixth judicial district of Iowa in 1878.

In 1880 Cook won the Democratic Party and Greenback Party nominations for the U.S. House seat in Iowa's 6th congressional district. After a very close general election race against Republican Marsena E. Cutts, Iowa's State Board of Canvassers concluded that Cutts had won 106 more votes. This enabled Cutts to be sworn in in 1881 and to initially serve as a congressman, as Cook pursued a contest of the election with the Republican-controlled U.S. House in the 47th United States Congress. A commissioner took evidence regarding the contest in Oskaloosa, Iowa, in the Spring of 1882, but the House Committee on Elections had not announced a decision by the date that the seat was again up for election in November 1882 (when Cutts undisputedly won a plurality of votes). It was not until February 1883, in the waning days of Cutts' first term, that the Committee issued its recommendation - an 8-2 vote that Cook, not Cutts, won the 1880 election. The House accepted this recommendation in time for Cook to serve only a single day of the term, on March 3, 1883, and to collect his salary.

In the 1882 election, Cook did not win the nomination of either the Democratic Party or the Greenback Party, which nominated separate candidates against Cutts. Because Cutts undisputedly won the election, his term in the 48th United States Congress began the day after Cook's single day in the previous Congress. However, Cutts died of tuberculosis on September 1, 1883. By a 234-vote margin, Cook won the special election to fill the vacancy left by Cutts' death, and served in Congress again until the term ended in March 1885. He did not run for re-election.

After returning to Iowa, he resumed practicing law in Newton, Iowa, and later moved to Webster City, Iowa, where he became attorney for a railroad company. He died in Algona, Iowa, on June 7, 1920, and was interred in Riverview Cemetery in Algona.

U.S. House of Representatives
Preceded by Marsena E. Cutts	Member of the U.S. House of Representatives from Iowa's 6th congressional district March 4, 1883 (obsolete district)	Succeeded by Marsena E. Cutts
Preceded by Marsena E. Cutts	Member of the U.S. House of Representatives from Iowa's 6th congressional district October 9, 1883 – March 3, 1885 (obsolete district)	Succeeded by James Weaver
