= Marsena E. Cutts =

American politician (1833–1883)

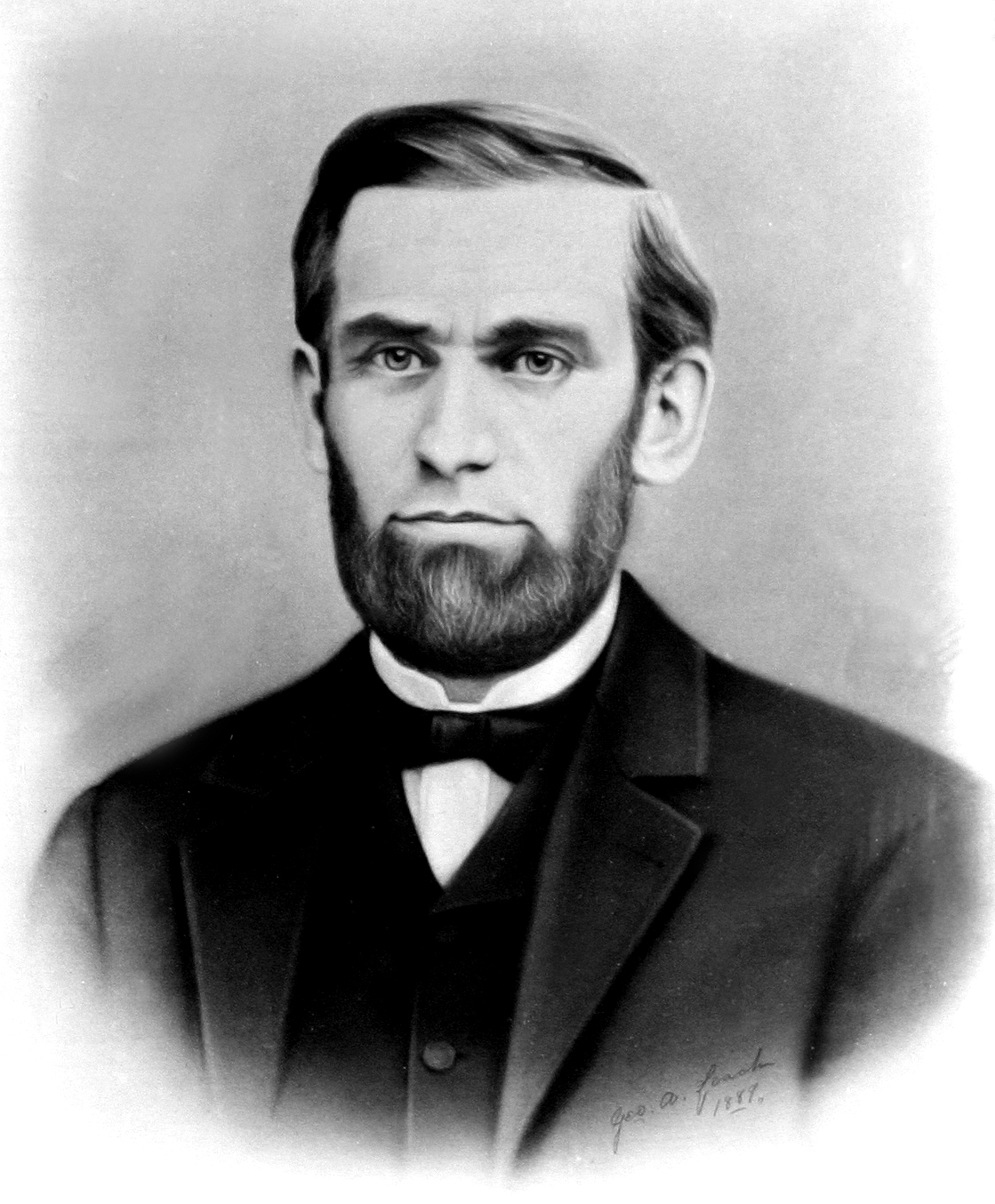

Member of the U.S. House of Representatives from Iowa's 6th district
- In office March 4, 1883 – September 1, 1883
- Preceded by: John C. Cook
- Succeeded by: John C. Cook
- In office March 4, 1881 – March 3, 1883
- Preceded by: James B. Weaver
- Succeeded by: John C. Cook

Attorney General of Iowa
- In office 1872–1877
- Governor: Cyrus C. Carpenter; Samuel J. Kirkwood
- Preceded by: Henry O'Connor
- Succeeded by: John F. McJunkin

Personal details
- Born: Marsena Edgar Cutts; May 22, 1833 Orwell, Vermont, U.S.
- Died: September 1, 1883 (aged 50) Oskaloosa, Iowa, U.S.
- Resting place: Forest Cemetery, Oskaloosa, Iowa
- Party: Republican
- Spouse: Helen Frick (m. 1857)
- Children: 4
- Profession: Attorney

Marsena Edgar Cutts (May 22, 1833 – September 1, 1883) was a nineteenth-century politician and lawyer from Iowa. A Republican, he was most notable for his service as Attorney General of Iowa from 1872 to 1877 and in the United States House of Representatives from March 1881 to March 1883 and again from March 1883 until his death.

== Early life ==
Born in Orwell, Vermont, Cutts attended common schools in his native village and later attended St. Lawrence Academy in Potsdam, New York. He moved to Sheboygan Falls, Wisconsin in 1853 where he taught school for two years and studied law. He moved to Oskaloosa, Iowa in 1855, continued to study law and was admitted to the bar the same year, commencing practice in Montezuma, Iowa. He was prosecuting attorney of Poweshiek County, Iowa in 1857 and 1858, was a member of the Iowa House of Representatives in 1861 and served in the Iowa Senate from 1864 to 1866. Cutts was again a member of the Iowa House of Representatives from 1870 to 1872 and was Attorney General of Iowa from 1872 to 1877.

== U.S. Congressman ==
In 1880, Cutts ran as a Republican for the U.S. House of Representatives for Iowa's 6th congressional district. He won the Republican nomination, and the Democratic and Greenback parties united behind a single opponent, Democrat John C. Cook. After a very close general election, Iowa's State Board of Canvassers concluded that Cutts had won 106 more votes. This enabled Cutts to be sworn in in 1881 and to initially serve as a congressman, as Cook pursued a contest of the election with the Republican-controlled U.S. House in the 47th United States Congress. A commissioner took evidence regarding the contest in Oskaloosa in the Spring of 1882, but the House Committee on Elections had not announced a decision by the date that the seat was again up for election in November 1882 (when Cutts undisputedly won a plurality of votes). It was not until February 1883, in the waning days of Cutts' first term, that the Committee issued its recommendation - an 8–2 vote that Cook, not Cutts, won the 1880 election. The House accepted this recommendation in time for Cutts to serve only a single day of the term, on March 3, 1883, and to collect his salary.

In the 1882 election, the Democratic Party and the Greenback Party nominated separate candidates. Cutts undisputedly won more votes than any other opponent, but the combined votes against him exceeded those in favor of him by over 5,000 votes. Because Cutts undisputedly won the election, his term in the 48th United States Congress began the day after Cook's single day in the previous Congress.

== Death and burial ==
Cutts was in poor health during his service in Congress. He died of tuberculosis in Oskaloosa, Iowa on September 1, 1883. He was interred at Forest Cemetery in Oskaloosa.

== Electoral history ==
1874 general election: Iowa Attorney General
| Party | Candidate | Votes | % |
|---|---|---|---|
| Democratic | Marsena E. Cutts (incumbent) | 106,632 | 57.2 |
| Republican | John H. Keatley | 79,754 | 42.7 |
| | scattering | 183 | 0.1 |

== See also ==
- List of members of the United States Congress who died in office (1790–1899)

U.S. House of Representatives
| Preceded by James Weaver | Member of the U.S. House of Representatives from Iowa's 6th congressional district March 4, 1881 – March 3, 1883 (obsolete district) | Succeeded by John C. Cook |
| Preceded by John C. Cook | Member of the U.S. House of Representatives from Iowa's 6th congressional district March 4, 1883 – September 1, 1883 (obsolete district) | Succeeded by John C. Cook |
Legal offices
| Preceded by Henry O'Connor | Attorney General of Iowa; 1872–1877 | Succeeded by John F. McJunkin |
