= Iowa =

U.S. state

Coordinates: 42°N 94°W

- State
- Flag Seal
- Nickname: Hawkeye State
- Motto(s): Our liberties we prize and our rights we will maintain
- Anthem: "The Song of Iowa"
- Location of Iowa within the United States
- Country: United States
- Before statehood: Iowa Territory
- Admitted to the Union: December 28, 1846 (29th)
- Capital (and largest city): Des Moines
- Largest county or equivalent: Polk
- Largest metro and urban areas: Greater Des Moines

Government
  - Governor: Kim Reynolds (R)
  - Lieutenant Governor: Chris Cournoyer (R)
- Legislature: General Assembly
  - Upper house: Senate
  - Lower house: House of Representatives
- Judiciary: Iowa Supreme Court
- U.S. senators: Chuck Grassley (R); Joni Ernst (R)
- U.S. House delegation: 1: Mariannette Miller-Meeks (R); 2: Ashley Hinson (R); 3: Zach Nunn (R); 4: Randy Feenstra (R) (list)

Area
  - Total: 56,273 sq mi (145,747 km^{2})
  - Land: 55,860 sq mi (144,670 km^{2})
  - Water: 416 sq mi (1,078 km^{2}) 0.71%
  - Rank: 26th
- Elevation: 1,120 ft (340 m)
- Highest elevation (Hawkeye Point (Note: Elevation adjusted to North American Vertical Datum of 1988)): 1,670 ft (509 m)

Population (2025)
  - Total: ▼3,238,387
  - Rank: 32nd
  - Density: 57/sq mi (22.1/km^{2})
  - Rank: 36th
  - Median household income: $71,400 (2023)
  - Income rank: 33rd
- Demonym: Iowan

Language
  - Official language: English
- Time zone: UTC−06:00 (Central)
  - Summer (DST): UTC−05:00 (CDT)
- USPS abbreviation: IA
- ISO 3166 code: US-IA
- Website: iowa.gov

State symbols of Iowa
List of state symbols
- Flag of Iowa

- Seal of Iowa
- Bird: Eastern goldfinch
- Flower: Prairie rose
- Tree: Bur Oak
- Rock: Geode

State route marker

State quarter
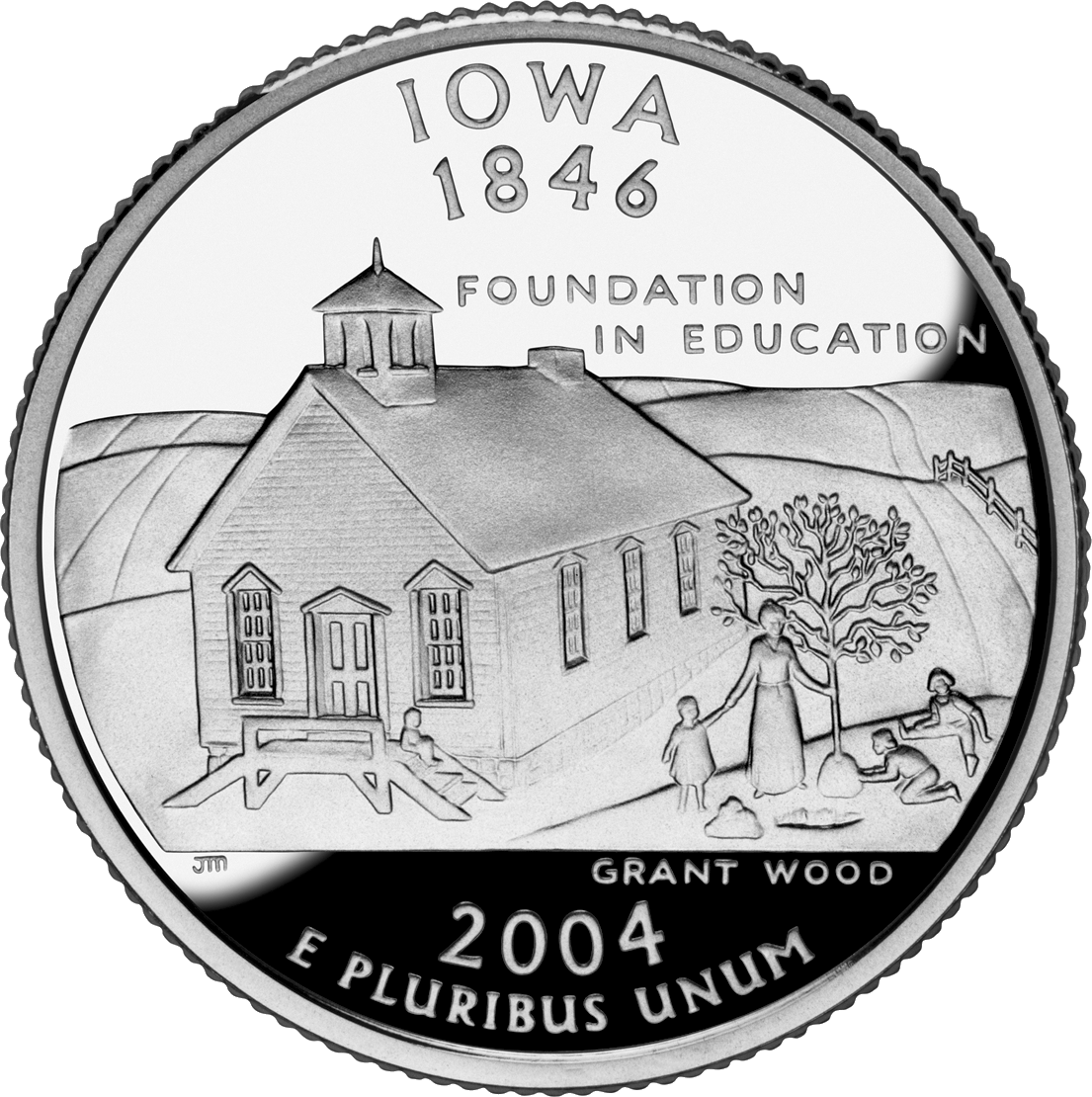
- Released in 2004

Iowa (/ˈaɪ.əwə/ EYE-ə-wə) is a landlocked state in the Upper Midwest region of the United States. It borders the Mississippi River to the east and the Missouri River and Big Sioux River to the west; Wisconsin to the northeast, Illinois to the east and southeast, Missouri to the south, Nebraska to the west, South Dakota to the northwest, and Minnesota to the north. Iowa is the 26th largest in total area and the 31st most populous of the 50 U.S. states, with a population of 3.19 million. The state's capital, most populous city, and largest metropolitan area fully located within the state is Des Moines.

During the 18th and early 19th centuries, Iowa was a part of French Louisiana and Spanish Louisiana; its state flag is patterned after the flag of France. After the Louisiana Purchase, pioneers laid the foundation for an agriculture-based economy in the heart of the Corn Belt. In the latter half of the 20th century, Iowa's agricultural economy began to transition to a diversified economy of advanced manufacturing, processing, financial services, information technology, biotechnology, and green energy production.

Politically, Iowa is notable for the Iowa Caucuses, an influential event in national politics, as well as its high levels of voter turnout and foundational leadership in civil rights including early adoption or support of black suffrage.

== Etymology ==
Like many other states, Iowa takes its name from its predecessor, Iowa Territory, whose name in turn is derived from the Iowa River, and ultimately from the ethnonym of the indigenous Ioway people. The Ioway are a Chiwere-speaking Siouan Nation, who were once part of the Ho-Chunk Confederation that inhabited the area now corresponding to several Midwest states. The Ioway were one of the many Native American nations whose territory comprised the future state of Iowa before the time of European colonization.

Meanwhile, the state nickname, being called the "Hawkeye State" comes from James Fennimore Cooper's second book in his Leatherstocking Tales pentalogy, The Last of the Mohicans: A Narrative of 1757 (published in 1826). Several influential people in Iowa at the time promoted the nickname, including Judge David Rorer and Newspaper editor James G. Edwards, who renamed his newspaper to The Hawk-Eye and Iowa Patriot and eventually to just the Hawk-Eye. The name received official recognition by Iowa Territory Governor Robert Lucas in 1838, when he and several members of his cabinet agreed upon its appropriateness.

== History ==
=== Prehistory ===
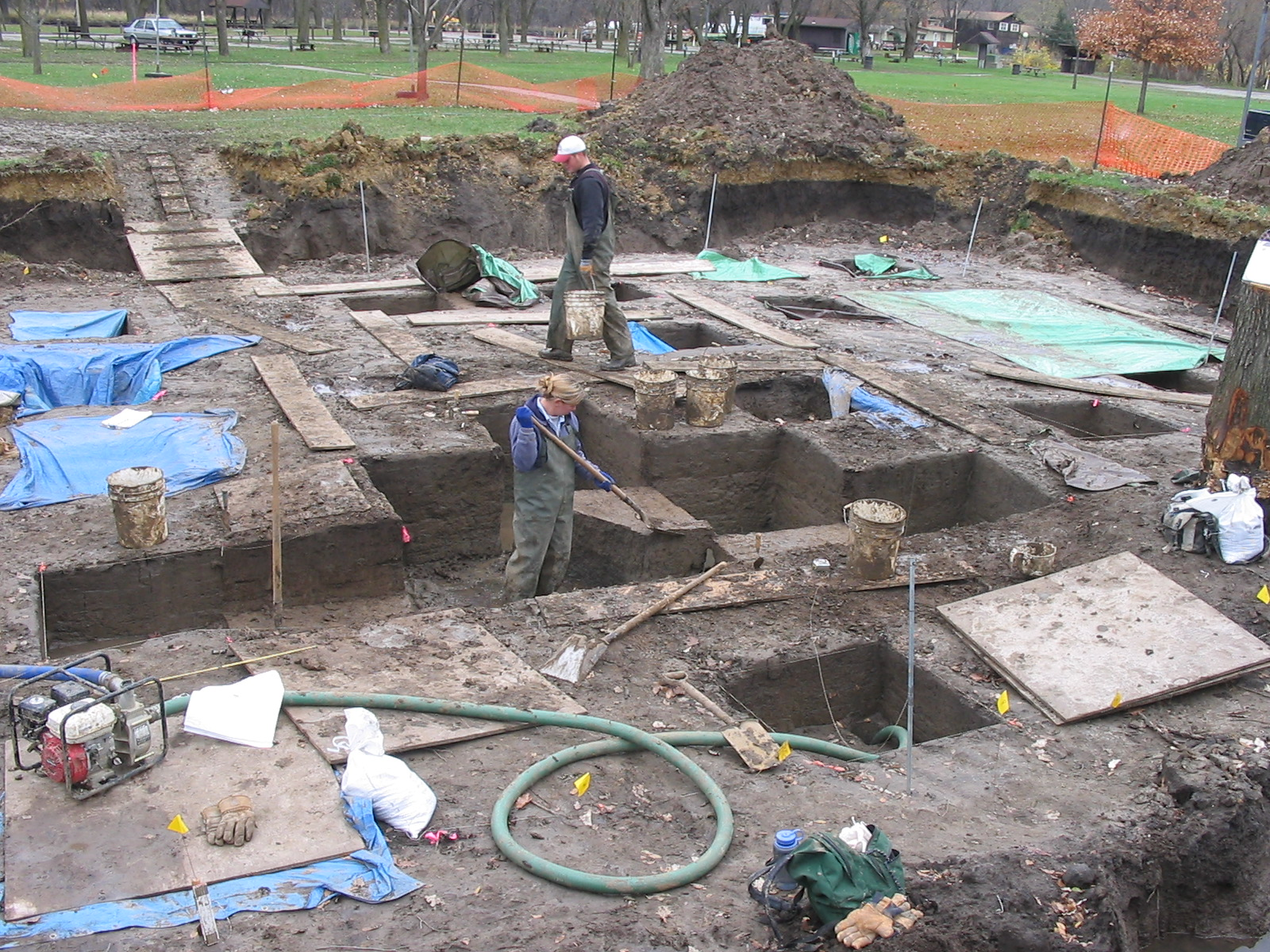
Excavation of the 3,800-year-old Edgewater Park Site

When Indigenous peoples of the Americas first arrived in what is now Iowa more than 13,000 years ago, they were hunters and gatherers living in a Pleistocene glacial landscape. By the time European explorers and traders visited Iowa, Native Americans were largely settled farmers with complex economic, social, and political systems. This transformation happened gradually. During the Archaic period (10,500 to 2,800 years ago), Native Americans adapted to local environments and ecosystems, slowly becoming more sedentary as populations increased.

More than 3,000 years ago, during the Late Archaic period, Native Americans in Iowa began utilizing domesticated plants. The subsequent Woodland period saw an increased reliance on agriculture and social complexity, with increased use of mounds, ceramics, and specialized subsistence. During the Late Prehistoric period (beginning about AD 900) increased use of maize and social changes led to social flourishing and nucleated settlements.

The arrival of European trade goods and diseases in the Protohistoric period led to dramatic population shifts and economic and social upheaval, with the arrival of new tribes and early European explorers and traders. There were numerous native American tribes living in Iowa at the time of early European exploration. Tribes which were probably descendants of the prehistoric Oneota include the Dakota, Ho-Chunk, Ioway, and Otoe. Tribes which arrived in Iowa in the late prehistoric or protohistoric periods include the Illiniwek, Meskwaki, Omaha, and Sauk.

=== Early colonization and trade, 1673–1808 ===
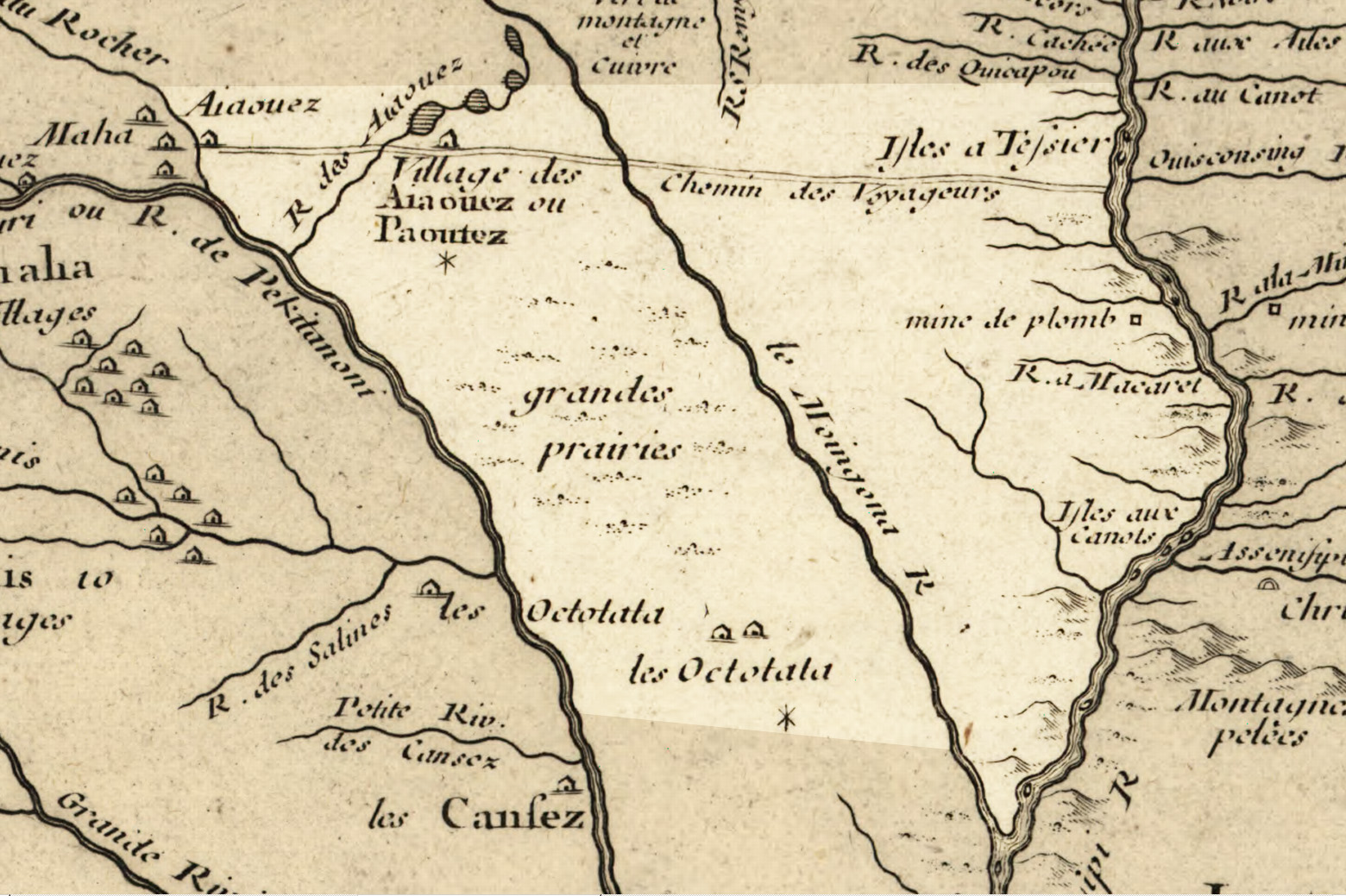
Iowa in 1718 with the modern state area highlighted

The first known European explorers to document Iowa were Jacques Marquette and Louis Jolliet who traveled the Mississippi River in 1673 documenting several Indigenous villages on the Iowa side. The area of Iowa was claimed for France and remained a French territory until 1763. The French, before their impending defeat in the French and Indian War, transferred ownership to their ally, Spain. Spain practiced very loose control over the Iowa region, granting trading licenses to French and British traders, who established trading posts along the Mississippi and Des Moines Rivers.

Iowa was part of a territory known as La Louisiane or Louisiana, and European traders were interested in lead and furs obtained by Indigenous people. The Sauk and Meskwaki effectively controlled trade on the Mississippi in the late 18th century and early 19th century. Among the early traders on the Mississippi were Julien Dubuque, Robert de la Salle, and Paul Marin. Along the Missouri River at least five French and English trading houses were built before 1808. In 1800, Napoleon Bonaparte took control of Louisiana from Spain in a treaty.

After the 1803 Louisiana Purchase, Congress divided the new land into two parts—the Territory of Orleans and the District of Louisiana, with present-day Iowa falling in the latter. The Indiana Territory, created in 1800, exercised jurisdiction over this portion of the District; William Henry Harrison was its first governor. Much of Iowa was mapped by Zebulon Pike in 1805, but it was not until the construction of Fort Madison in 1808 that the U.S. established tenuous military control over the region.

=== War of 1812 and unstable U.S. control ===
Fort Madison was built to control trade and establish U.S. dominance over the Upper Mississippi, but it was poorly designed and disliked by the Sauk and Meskwaki, many of whom allied with the British, who had not abandoned claims to the territory. Fort Madison was defeated by British-supported Indigenous people in 1813 during the War of 1812, and Fort Shelby in Prairie du Chien, Wisconsin, also fell to the British. Black Hawk took part in the siege of Fort Madison. Another small military outpost was established along the Mississippi River in present-day Bellevue. This poorly situated stockade was similarly attacked by hundreds of Indigenous people in 1813, but was successfully defended and later abandoned until settlers returned to the area in the mid-1830s.

After the war, the U.S. re-established control of the region through the construction of Fort Armstrong, Fort Snelling in Minnesota, and Fort Atkinson in Nebraska.

=== Indian removal, 1814–1832 ===
The United States encouraged settlement of the east side of the Mississippi and removal of Indians to the west. A disputed 1804 treaty between Quashquame and William Henry Harrison (then governor of the Indiana Territory) that surrendered much of Illinois to the U.S. enraged many Sauk and led to the 1832 Black Hawk War.

The Sauk and Meskwaki were forced to sell some of their land in the Mississippi Valley to the U.S. in 1832 under the Black Hawk Purchase Treaty and sold their remaining land in Iowa in 1842, most of them moving to a reservation in Kansas. In 1837, some the Potawatomi from Illinois were resettled in Iowa, while many Meskwaki later returned to Iowa and settled near Tama, Iowa; the Meskwaki Settlement remains to this day. In 1856 the Iowa Legislature passed an unprecedented act allowing the Meskwaki to purchase the land. The federal government, in contrast, used treaties to force the Ho-Chunk and the Dakota from Iowa by 1848 and 1858, respectively. Western Iowa around modern Council Bluffs was used as an Indian Reservation for members of the Council of Three Fires.

=== U.S. settlement and statehood, 1832–1860 ===
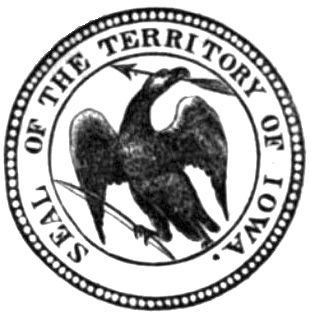
Iowa Territorial Seal

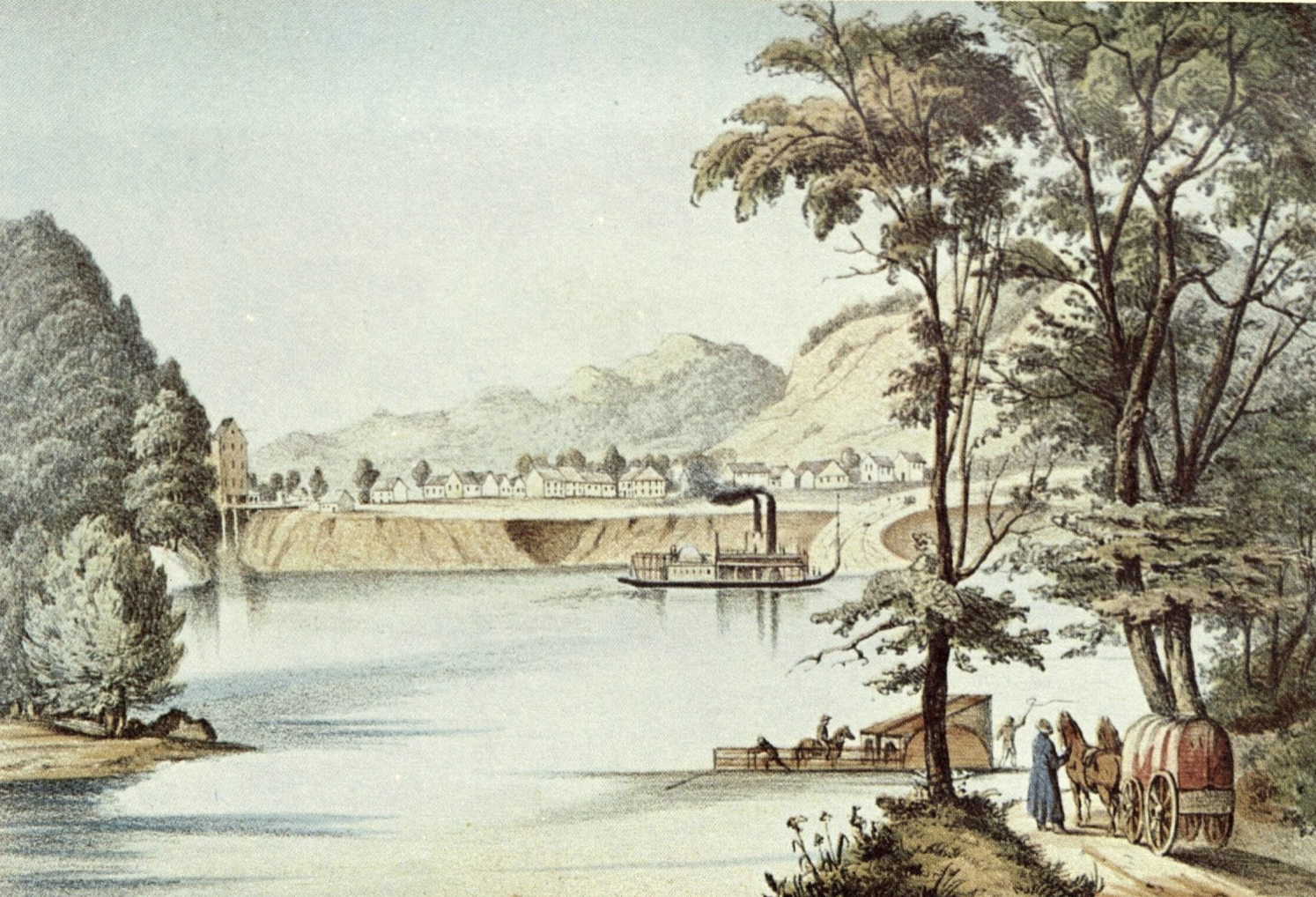
Bellevue along the Mississippi, 1848

The first American settlers officially moved to Iowa in June 1833. Primarily, they were families from Ohio, Pennsylvania, New York, Indiana, Kentucky, and Virginia who settled along the western banks of the Mississippi River, founding the modern day cities of Dubuque and Bellevue near the site of Julien Dubuque's 1785–1810 lead mining operation. On July 4, 1838, the U.S. Congress established the Territory of Iowa. President Martin Van Buren appointed Robert Lucas governor of the territory, which at the time had 22 counties and a population of 23,242.

Almost immediately after Iowa achieved territorial status, a clamor arose for statehood. On December 28, 1846, Iowa became the 29th state in the Union when President James K. Polk signed its admission bill into law. Once admitted to the Union, with the state's boundary issues resolved and most of its land purchased from Natives, Iowa set its direction to development and organized campaigns for settlers and investors, boasting the young frontier state's rich farmlands, fine citizens, free and open society, and good government.

Iowa has a long tradition of state and county fairs. The first and second Iowa State Fairs were held in the more developed eastern part of the state at Fairfield. The first fair was held October 25–27, 1854, at a cost of around $323. Thereafter, the fair moved to locations closer to the center of the state and in 1886 found a permanent home in Des Moines. The State Fair has been held annually since then, except for a few exceptions: 1898 due to the Spanish–American War and the World's Fair being held in nearby Omaha, Nebraska; from 1942 to 1945, due to World War II, as the fairgrounds were being used as an army supply depot; and in 2020 due to the COVID pandemic.

=== Civil War, 1861–1865 ===
Iowa supported the Union during the Civil War, voting heavily for Abraham Lincoln, though there was an antiwar "Copperhead" movement in the state, caused partially by a drop in crop prices caused by the war. There were no battles in the state, although the Battle of Athens, Missouri, 1861, was fought just across the Des Moines River from Croton, Iowa, and shots from the battle landed in Iowa. Iowa sent large supplies of food to the armies and the eastern cities.

Much of Iowa's support for the Union can be attributed to Samuel J. Kirkwood, its first wartime governor. Of a total population of 675,000, about 116,000 men were subjected to military duty. Iowa contributed proportionately more soldiers to Civil War military service than did any other state, north or south, sending more than 75,000 volunteers to the armed forces, over one-sixth of whom were killed before the Confederates surrendered at Appomattox.

Most fought in the great campaigns in the Mississippi Valley and in the South. Iowa troops fought at Wilson's Creek in Missouri, Pea Ridge in Arkansas, Forts Henry and Donelson, Shiloh, Chattanooga, Chickamauga, Missionary Ridge, and Rossville Gap as well as Vicksburg, Iuka, and Corinth. They served with the Army of the Potomac in Virginia and fought under Union General Philip Sheridan in the Shenandoah Valley. Many died and were buried at Andersonville. They marched on General Nathaniel Banks' ill-starred expedition to the Red River. Twenty-seven Iowans have been awarded the Medal of Honor, the highest military decoration awarded by the United States government, which was first awarded in the Civil War.

Iowa had several brigadier generals and four major generals—Grenville Mellen Dodge, Samuel R. Curtis, Francis J. Herron, and Frederick Steele—and saw many of its generals go on to state and national prominence following the war.

=== Agricultural expansion, 1865–1930 ===
Following the Civil War, Iowa's population continued to grow dramatically, from 674,913 people in 1860 to 1,624,615 in 1880. The American Civil War briefly brought higher profits.

In 1917, the United States entered World War I and farmers as well as all Iowans experienced a wartime economy. For farmers, the change was significant. Since the beginning of the war in 1914, Iowa farmers had experienced economic prosperity, which lasted until the end of the war. In the economic sector, Iowa also has undergone considerable change. Beginning with the first industries developed in the 1830s, which were mainly for processing materials grown in the area, Iowa has experienced a gradual increase in the number of business and manufacturing operations.

=== Depression, World War II and manufacturing, 1930–1985 ===
The transition from an agricultural economy to a mixed economy happened slowly. The Great Depression and World War II accelerated the shift away from smallholder farming to larger farms, and began a trend of urbanization. The period after World War II witnessed a particular increase in manufacturing operations.

In 1975, Governor Robert D. Ray petitioned President Ford to allow Iowa to accept and resettle Tai Dam refugees fleeing the Indochina War. An exception was required for this resettlement as State Dept policy at the time forbid resettlement of large groups of refugees in concentrated communities; an exception was ultimately granted and 1200 Tai Dam were resettled in Iowa. Since then Iowa has accepted thousands of refugees from Laos, Cambodia, Thailand, Bhutan, and Burma.

The farm crisis of the 1980s caused a major recession in Iowa, causing poverty not seen since the Depression. The crisis spurred a major, decade-long population decline.

=== Reemergence as a mixed economy, 1985–present ===
After bottoming out in the 1980s, Iowa's economy began to reduce its dependence on agriculture. By the early 21st century, it was characterized by a mix of manufacturing, biotechnology, finance and insurance services, and government services. The population of Iowa has increased at a slower rate than the U.S. as a whole since at least the 1900 census, though Iowa now has a predominantly urban population. The Iowa Economic Development Authority, created in 2011 has replaced the Iowa Department of Economic Development and its annual reports are a source of economic information. Its premier business development initiative, the High Quality Jobs (HQJ) tax credit program, has been cited as an economic development tool, driving $7.4 billion in investment to the state from 2004 to 2012.

== Geography ==
=== Boundaries ===
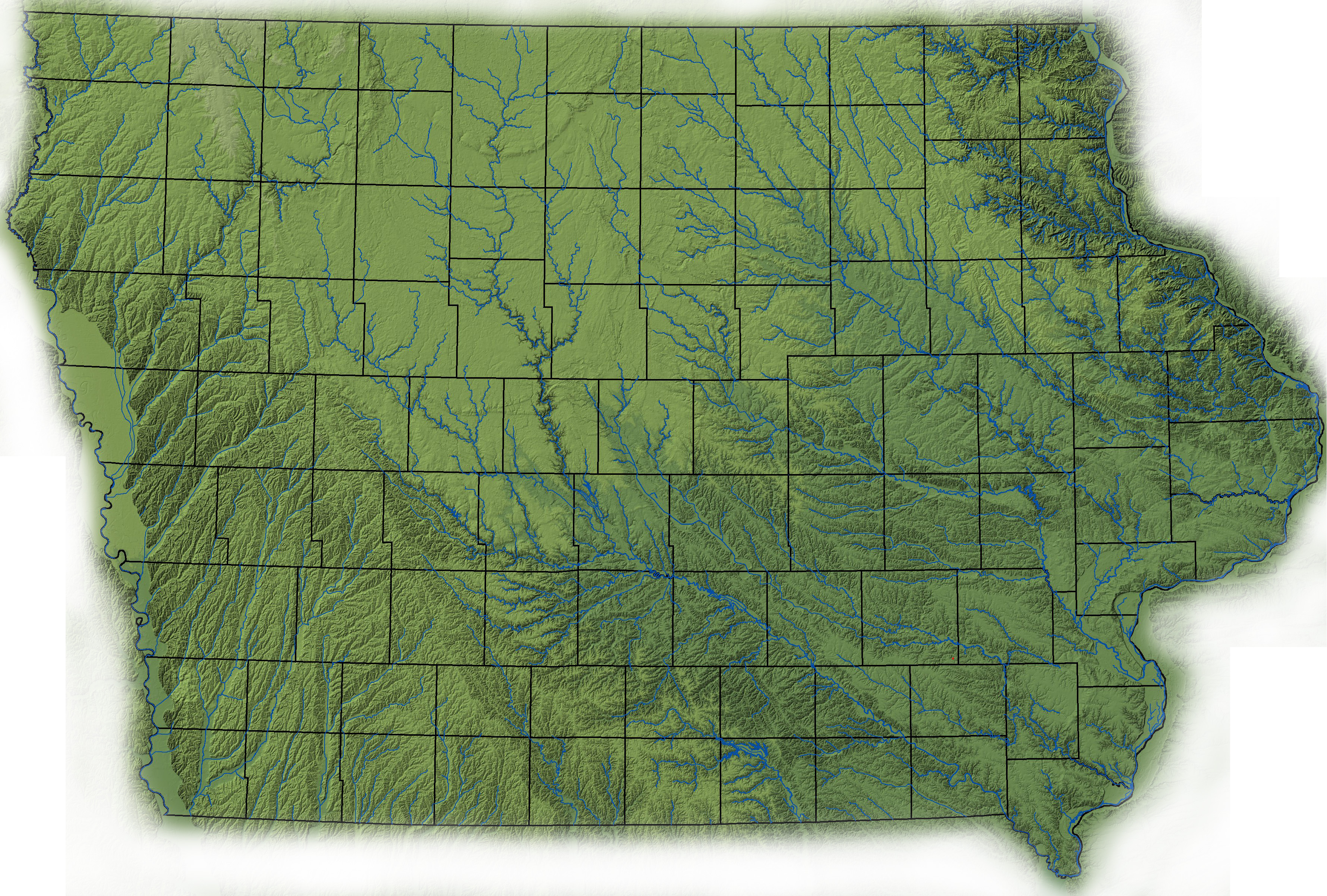
Topography of Iowa, with counties and major streams

Iowa is bordered by the Mississippi River on the east along with the Missouri River and the Big Sioux River on the west. The northern boundary is a line along 43 degrees, 30 minutes north latitude. (Note: The Missouri and Mississippi river boundaries are as they were mapped in the 19th century, which can vary from their modern courses.) The southern border is the Des Moines River and a not-quite-straight line along approximately 40 degrees 35 minutes north, as decided by the U.S. Supreme Court in Missouri v. Iowa (1849) after a standoff between Missouri and Iowa known as the Honey War.

Iowa is the only state whose east and west borders are formed almost entirely by rivers. Carter Lake, Iowa, is the only city in the state located west of the Missouri River.

Iowa has 99 counties, but 100 county seats because Lee County has two. The state capital, Des Moines, is in Polk County.

=== Geology and terrain ===
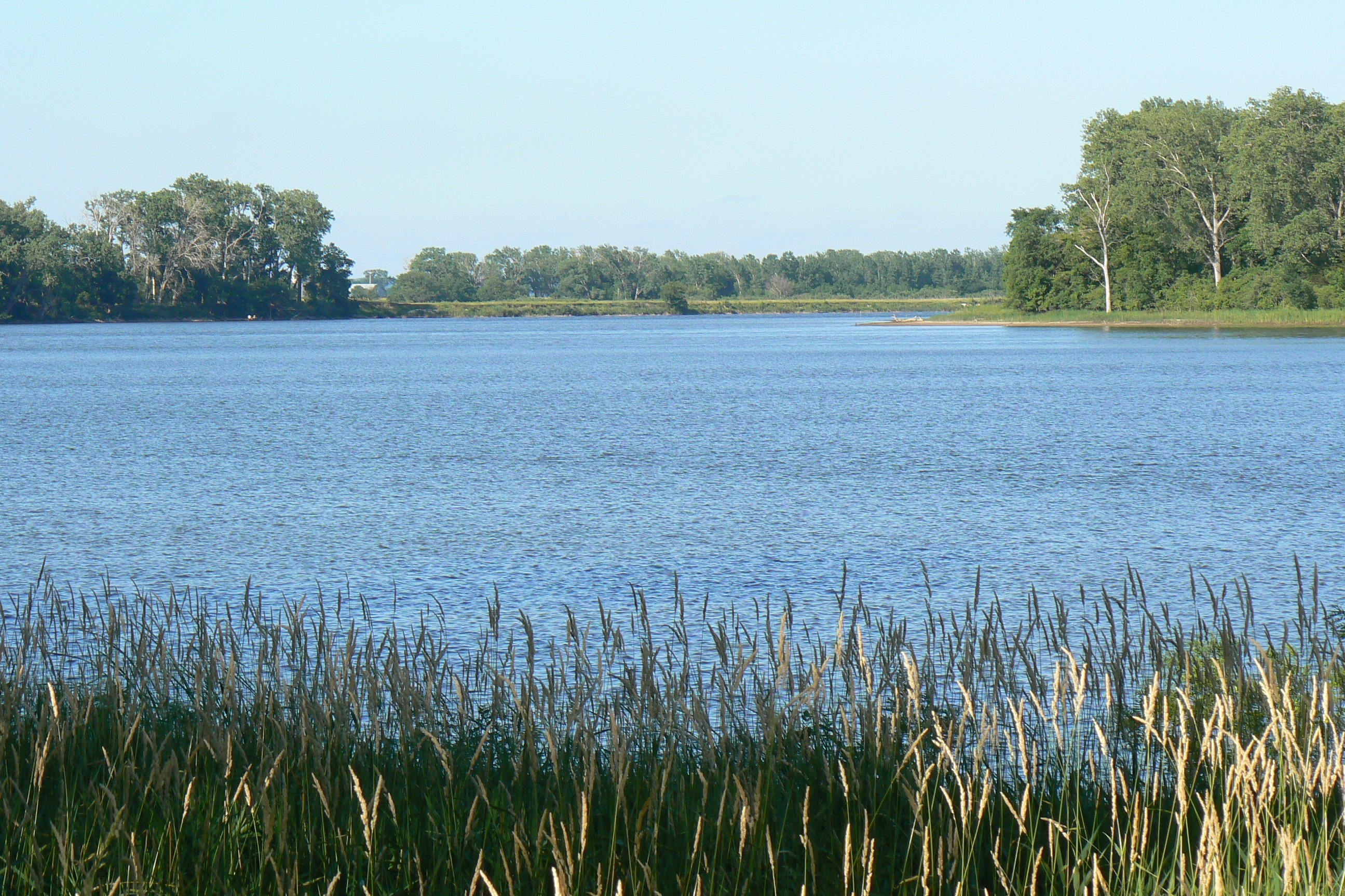
DeSoto Lake at DeSoto National Wildlife Refuge

Iowa's bedrock geology generally increases in age from west to east. In northwest Iowa, Cretaceous bedrock can be 74 million years old; in eastern Iowa Cambrian bedrock dates to c. 500 million years ago. The oldest radiometrically dated bedrock in the state is the 2.9 billion year old Otter Creek Layered Mafic Complex. Precambrian rock is exposed only in the northwest of the state.

Iowa can be divided into eight landforms based on glaciation, soils, topography, and river drainage. Loess hills lie along the western border of the state, some of which are several hundred feet thick. Northeast Iowa along the Upper Mississippi River is part of the Driftless Area, consisting of steep hills and valleys which appear as mountainous.

Several natural lakes exist, most notably Spirit Lake, West Okoboji Lake, and East Okoboji Lake in northwest Iowa (see Iowa Great Lakes). To the east lies Clear Lake. Man-made lakes include Lake Odessa, Saylorville Lake, Lake Red Rock, Coralville Lake, Lake MacBride, and Rathbun Lake. Before European settlement, 4 to 6 million acres of the state was covered with wetlands; about 95% of these wetlands have since been drained.

=== Ecology and environment ===
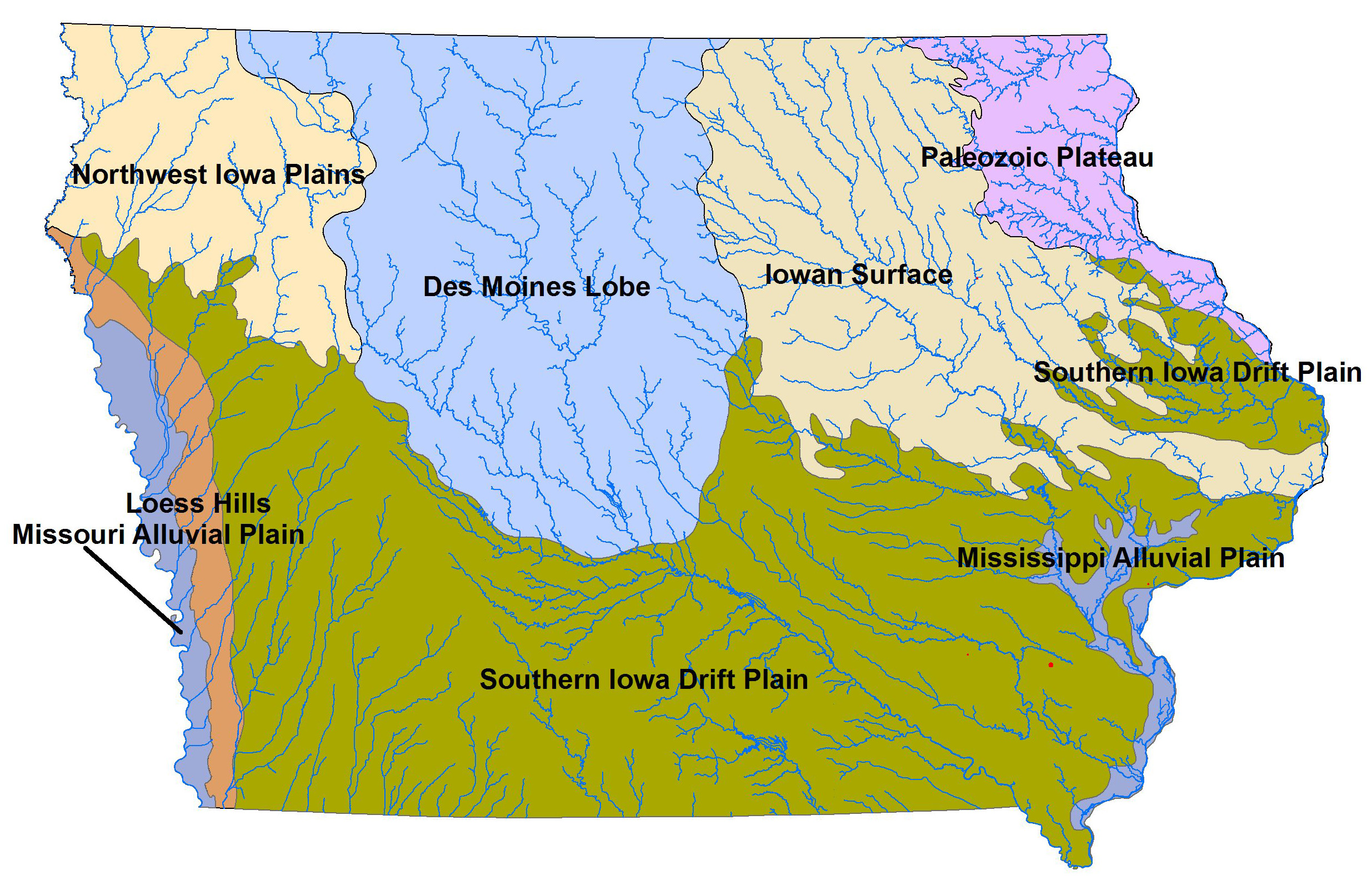
Landforms of Iowa

Iowa's natural vegetation is tallgrass prairie and savanna in upland areas, with dense forest and wetlands in flood plains and protected river valleys, and pothole wetlands in northern prairie areas. Most of Iowa is used for agriculture; crops cover 60% of the state, grasslands (mostly pasture and hay with some prairie and wetland) cover 30%, and forests cover 7%; urban areas and water cover another 1% each.

The southern part of Iowa is categorized as the Central forest-grasslands transition ecoregion. The Northern, drier part of Iowa is categorized as part of the Central tall grasslands.

There is a dearth of natural areas in Iowa; less than 1% of the tallgrass prairie that once covered most of Iowa remains intact; only about 5% of the state's prairie pothole wetlands remain, and most of the original forest has been lost. As of 2005 Iowa ranked 49th of U.S. states in public land holdings. Threatened or endangered animals in Iowa include the interior least tern, piping plover, Indiana bat, pallid sturgeon, the Iowa Pleistocene land snail, Higgins' eye pearly mussel, and the Topeka shiner. Endangered or threatened plants include western prairie fringed orchid, eastern prairie fringed orchid, Mead's milkweed, prairie bush clover, and northern wild monkshood.

The explosion in the number of high-density livestock facilities in Iowa has led to increased rural water contamination and a decline in air quality.

Other factors negatively affecting Iowa's environment include the extensive use of older coal-fired power plants, fertilizer and pesticide runoff from crop production, and diminishment of the Jordan Aquifer.

The 2020–2023 North American drought has affected Iowa particularly: As of January 2024, Iowa was in its 187th consecutive week of at least moderate drought, the longest stretch since the 1950s. 96% of areas are affected by drought.

=== Climate ===
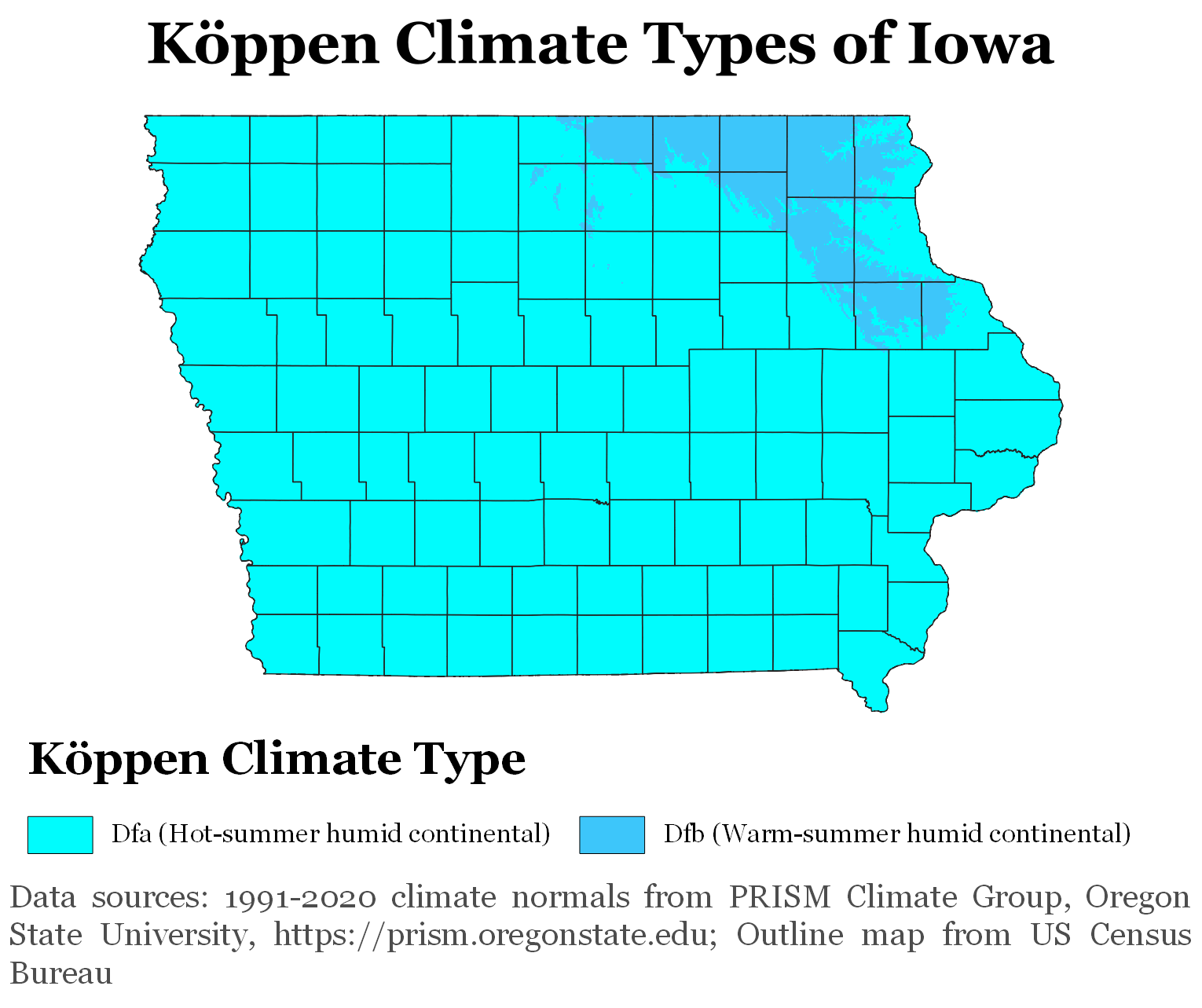
Köppen climate types of Iowa, using 1991–2020 climate normals

Iowa has a humid continental climate throughout the state (Köppen climate classification Dfa) with extremes of both heat and cold. The average annual temperature at Des Moines is 50 °F (10 °C); for some locations in the north, such as Mason City, the figure is about 45 °F (7 °C), while Keokuk, on the Mississippi River, averages 52 °F (11 °C). Snowfall is common, with Des Moines getting about 26 days of snowfall a year, and other places, such as Shenandoah, getting about 11 days of snowfall in a year.

Spring ushers in the beginning of the severe weather season. As of 2008, Iowa averaged about 50 days of thunderstorm activity per year. As of 2015, the 30-year annual average of tornadoes in Iowa was 47. In 2008, twelve people were killed by tornadoes in Iowa, making it the deadliest year since 1968 and also the second most tornadoes in a year with 105, matching the total from 2001.

Iowa summers are known for heat and humidity, with daytime temperatures sometimes near 90 °F (32 °C) and occasionally exceeding 100 °F (38 °C). Average winters in the state have been known to drop well below freezing, even dropping below −18 °F (−28 °C). As of 2018, Iowa's all-time hottest temperature of 118 °F (48 °C) was recorded at Keokuk on July 20, 1934, during a nationwide heat wave; as of 2014, the all-time lowest temperature of −47 °F (−44 °C) was recorded in Washta on January 12, 1912.

Monthly normal high/low temperatures for various Iowa cities (°F)
City	Jan	Feb	Mar	Apr	May	Jun	Jul	Aug	Sep	Oct	Nov	Dec
Davenport	30/13	36/19	48/29	61/41	72/52	81/63	85/68	83/66	76/57	65/45	48/32	35/20
Des Moines	31/14	36/19	49/30	62/41	72/52	82/62	86/67	84/65	76/55	63/43	48/31	34/18
Keokuk	34/17	39/21	50/30	63/42	73/52	83/62	87/67	85/65	78/56	66/44	51/33	33/21
Mason City	24/6	29/12	41/23	57/35	69/46	79/57	82/61	80/58	73/49	60/37	43/25	28/11
Sioux City	31/10	35/15	47/26	62/37	73/49	82/59	86/63	83/63	76/51	63/38	46/25	32/13
Dubuque	27/11	32/16	44/27	58/38	69/48	78/58	82/62	80/60	72/52	60/40	45/29	30/15

==== Precipitation ====
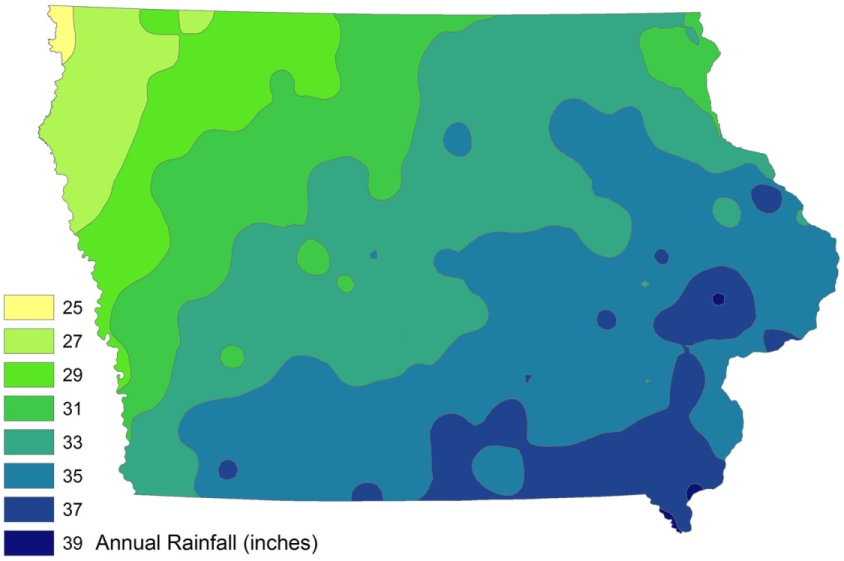
Iowa annual rainfall, in inches; as of 2009

Iowa has had a relatively smooth gradient of varying precipitation across the state; from 1961 to 1990, areas in the southeast of the state received an average of over 38 inches (97 cm) of rain annually, and the northwest of the state receiving less than 28 inches (71 cm). The pattern of precipitation across Iowa is seasonal with more rain falling in the summer months. Virtually statewide, the driest month is January or February, while the wettest month is June due to frequent showers and thunderstorms, some of which produce hail, damaging winds or tornadoes. In Des Moines, roughly in the center of the state, over two-thirds of the 34.72 inches (88.2 cm) of rain falls from April through September, and about half the average annual precipitation falls from May through August peaking in June.

=== Settlements ===
Iowa's population is more urban than rural, with 61 percent living in urban areas in 2000, a trend that began in the early 20th century. Urban counties in Iowa grew 8.5% from 2000 to 2008, while rural counties declined by 4.2%. The shift from rural to urban has caused population increases in more urbanized counties such as Dallas, Johnson, Linn, Polk, and Scott, at the expense of more rural counties.

Iowa, in common with other Midwestern states (especially Kansas, Nebraska, North Dakota, and South Dakota), is feeling the brunt of rural flight, although the population of Iowa has been increasing since approximately 1990. Some smaller communities, such as Denison and Storm Lake, have mitigated this population loss through gains in immigrant laborers.

Another demographic problem for Iowa is brain drain, in which educated young adults leave the state in search of better prospects in higher education or employment. During the 1990s, Iowa had the second highest exodus rate for single, educated young adults, second only to North Dakota.

Iowa's largest cities and their surrounding areas Recorded by the United States Census Bureau
Rank	City	2020 city population	2010 city population	Change	Metropolitan Statistical Area	2020 metro population	2010 metro population	2020 metro change
1	Des Moines	214,133	203,433	+5.26%	Des Moines–West Des Moines	707,915	606,475	+16.73%
2	Cedar Rapids	137,710	126,326	+9.01%	Cedar Rapids	273,885	257,940	+6.18%
3	Davenport	101,724	99,685	+2.05%	Quad Cities	382,268	379,690	+0.68%
4	Sioux City	85,797	82,684	+3.76%	Sioux City	144,996	143,577	+0.99%
5	Iowa City	74,828	67,862	+10.26%	Iowa City	175,732	152,586	+15.17%
6	West Des Moines	68,723	56,609	+21.40%	Des Moines–West Des Moines			
7	Ankeny	67,887	45,582	+48.93%	Des Moines–West Des Moines			
8	Waterloo	67,314	68,406	−1.60%	Waterloo–Cedar Falls	168,314	167,819	+0.29%
9	Ames	66,427	58,965	+12.65%	Ames	124,514	115,848	+7.48%
10	Council Bluffs	62,799	62,230	+0.91%	Omaha–Council Bluffs	954,270	865,350	+10.28%
11	Dubuque	59,667	57,637	+3.52%	Dubuque	97,590	93,653	+4.20%
12	Urbandale	45,580	39,463	+15.50%	Des Moines–West Des Moines			
13	Marion	41,535	34,768	+19.46%	Cedar Rapids			
14	Cedar Falls	40,713	39,260	+3.70%	Waterloo–Cedar Falls			
15	Bettendorf	39,102	33,217	+17.72%	Quad Cities			

== Demographics ==
=== Population ===
Historical population
Census	Pop.	Note	%±
1840	43,112		—
1850	192,214		345.8%
1860	674,913		251.1%
1870	1,194,020		76.9%
1880	1,624,615		36.1%
1890	1,912,297		17.7%
1900	2,231,853		16.7%
1910	2,224,771		−0.3%
1920	2,404,021		8.1%
1930	2,470,939		2.8%
1940	2,538,268		2.7%
1950	2,621,073		3.3%
1960	2,757,537		5.2%
1970	2,824,376		2.4%
1980	2,913,808		3.2%
1990	2,776,755		−4.7%
2000	2,926,324		5.4%
2010	3,046,355		4.1%
2020	3,190,369		4.7%
2025 (est.)	3,238,387		1.5%
Source: 1910–2020

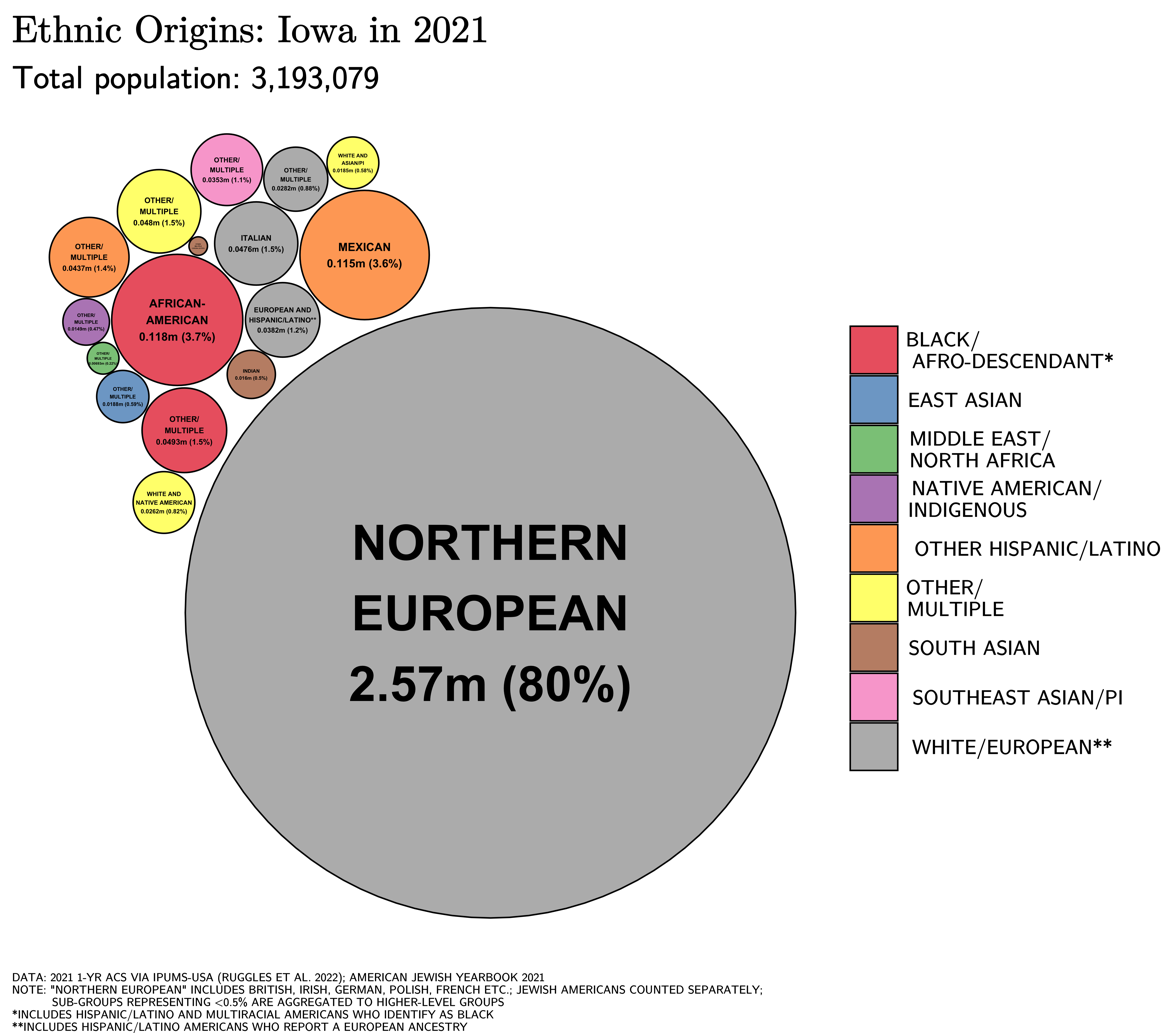
Ethnic origins in Iowa

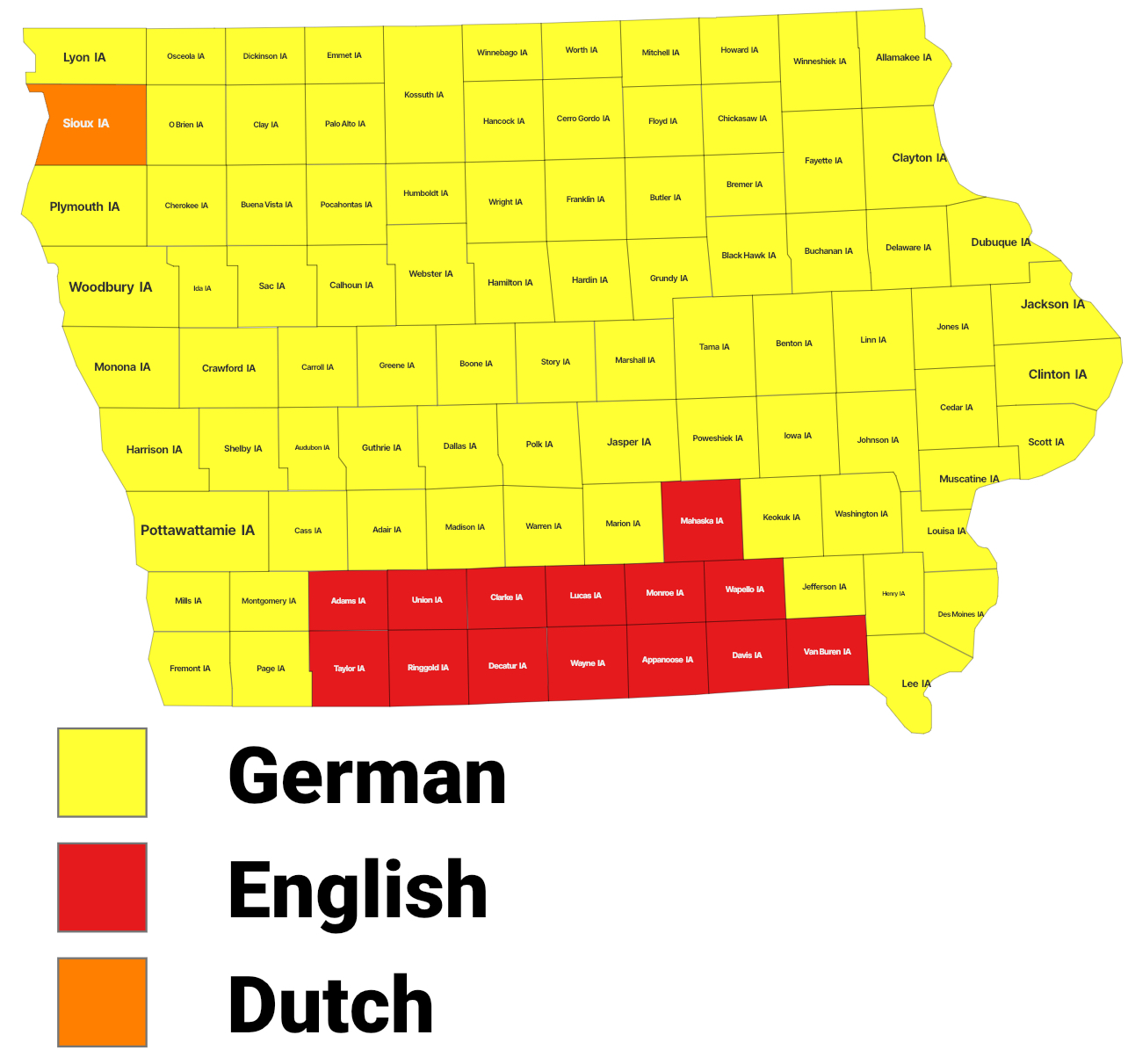
Largest alone or in any combination ethnic origin by county in Iowa, per the 2020 census

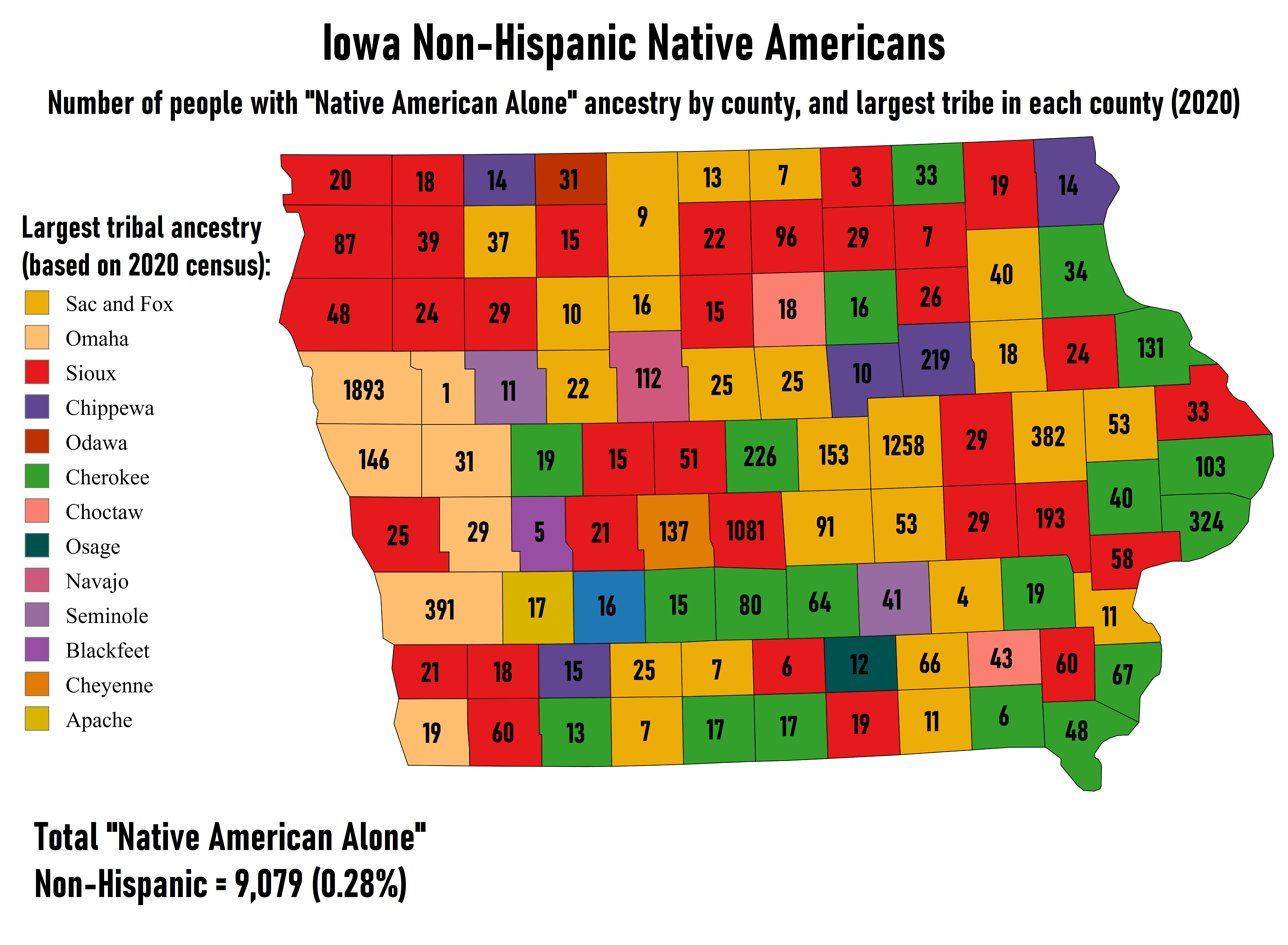

The United States Census Bureau determined the population of Iowa was 3,190,369 on April 1, 2020, a 4.73% increase since the 2010 United States census.

Of the residents of Iowa, 70.8% were born in Iowa, 23.6% were born in a different U.S. state, 0.6% were born in Puerto Rico, U.S. Island areas, or born abroad to American parent(s), and 5% were foreign born.

Immigration from outside the United States resulted in a net increase of 29,386 people, while migration within the country produced a net loss of 41,140 people. 6.5% of Iowa's population were reported as under the age of five, 22.6% under 18, and 14.7% were 65 or older. Males made up approximately 49.6% of the population. The population density of the state is 52.7 people per square mile. As of the 2010 census, the center of population of Iowa is in Marshall County, near Melbourne. The top countries of origin for Iowa's immigrants in 2018 were Mexico, India, Vietnam, China and Thailand.

According to a version of Encyclopædia Britannica published in 1999, Germans are the largest ethnic group in Iowa. Other major ethnic groups in Iowa include Irish and English. There are also Dutch communities in the state. The Dutch can be found in Pella, in the centre of the state, and in Orange City, in the northwest. There is a Norwegian community in Decorah in northeast Iowa; and there are Czech and Slovak communities in both Cedar Rapids and Iowa City. Smaller numbers of Greeks and Italians are scattered in Iowa's metropolitan areas. The majority of Hispanics in Iowa are of Mexican origin.

African Americans, who constitute around 4% of Iowa's population, did not live in the state in any appreciable numbers until the early 20th century. Many blacks worked in the coal-mining industry of southern Iowa. Other blacks migrated to Waterloo, Davenport, and Des Moines, where the black population remained substantial in the early 21st century. The African-American population in Des Moines experienced a significant increase with the establishment of the Colored Officers Training Camp at Fort Des Moines in 1917. Following the conclusion of World War I in 1918, numerous African-American families made the decision to remain in Des Moines. This marked the inception of a thriving community that eventually became a residence for numerous African-American leaders. In the 2020 Census, 131,972 Iowa residents were identified as African American (of the total 3,190,369). In 1 of the state's 99 counties, African Americans make up more than 10% of the population: Black Hawk (10.4%). African Americans in the seven counties of Polk (35,623), Linn (16,449), Scott (14,117), Black Hawk (13,676), Johnson (12,847), Woodbury (5,197), and Dubuque (4,126) make up more than 77% of all African Americans in the state.

There is one federally recognized tribe in Iowa, the Sac and Fox Tribe of the Mississippi in Iowa, and in 2020, 14,486 identified as being Native American alone, and 41,472 did in combination with one or more other races.

As of the 2010 census, the population of Iowa was 3,046,355. The gender makeup of the state was 49.5% male and 50.5% female. 23.9% of the population were under the age of 18; 61.2% were between the ages of 18 and 64; and 14.9% were 65 years of age or older.

Ethnic composition as of the 2020 census
Race and Ethnicity	Alone	Total
White (non-Hispanic)	82.7%	85.9%
Hispanic or Latino (Note: Persons of Hispanic or Latino origin are not distinguished between total and partial ancestry.)	—	6.8%
African American (non-Hispanic)	4.1%	5.2%
Asian	2.4%	3.0%
Native American	0.3%	1.4%
Pacific Islander	0.2%	0.3%
Other	0.3%	1.0%

Map of counties in Iowa by racial plurality, per the 2020 U.S. census Non-Hispanic White: 50–60% 60–70% 70–80% 80–90% 90%+

Iowa historical racial composition
Racial composition	1990	2000	2010	2020
White	96.6%	93.9%	91.3%	84.5%
Black or African American	1.7%	2.1%	2.9%	4.1%
Native American	0.3%	0.3%	0.4%	0.5%
Asian	0.9%	1.3%	1.7%	2.4%
Native Hawaiian and Other Pacific Islander	—	—	0.1%	0.2%
Other race	0.5%	1.3%	1.8%	2.8%
Two or more races	—	1.1%	1.8%	5.6%

According to the 2016 American Community Survey, 5.6% of Iowa's population were of Hispanic or Latino origin (of any race): Mexican (4.3%), Puerto Rican (0.2%), Cuban (0.1%), and other Hispanic or Latino origin (1.0%). The five largest ancestry groups were: German (35.1%), Irish (13.5%), English (8.2%), American (5.8%), and Norwegian (5.0%).

=== Religion ===
Religious self-identification, per Public Religion Research Institute's 2022 American Values Survey
1. Protestantism (48.0%)
2. Catholicism (20.0%)
3. Unitarian/Universalist (1.00%)
4. Unaffiliated (29.0%)
5. Other (2.00%)

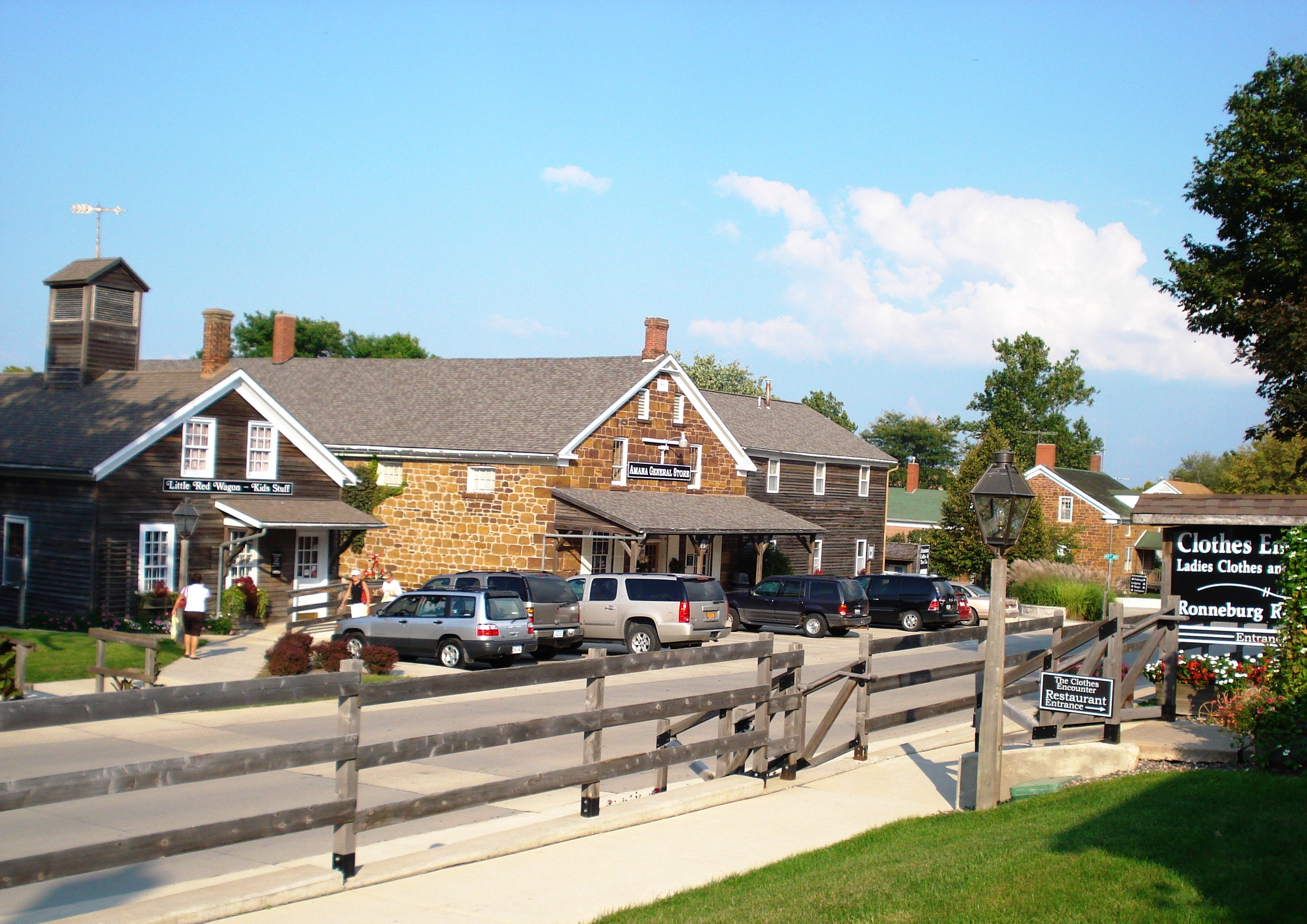
Amana Colonies were founded by German Pietists

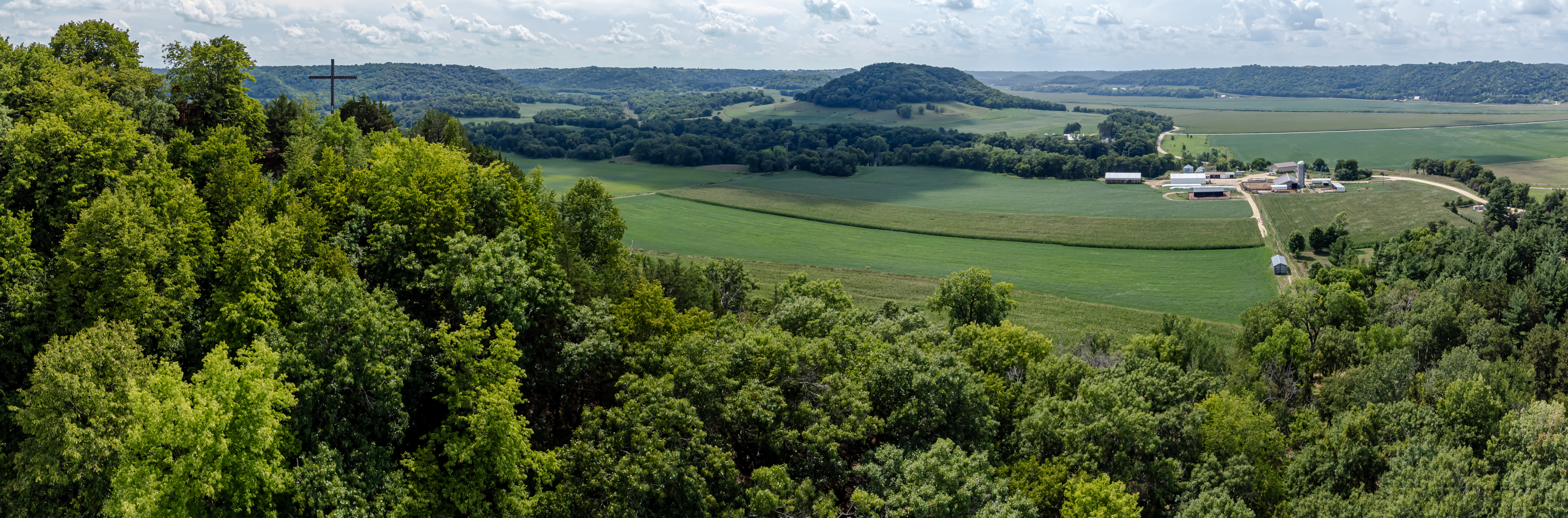
A Christian cross on a hill in Iowa

A 2014 survey by the Pew Research Center found that 60% of Iowans are Protestant, while 18% are Catholic, and 1% are of non-Christian religions. 21% responded with non-religious, and 1% did not answer.

=== Language ===
English is the most common language in Iowa, being the sole language spoken by 91.1% of the population. Less common languages include sign language and indigenous languages. About 2.5% of the general population use sign language as of 2017, while indigenous languages are spoken by about 0.5% of the population. After English, Spanish is the second-most-common language, with 120,000 people in Iowa of Hispanic or Latino origin and 47,000 people born in Latin America. The third-most-common language is German, spoken by 17,000 people in Iowa; two notable German dialects used in Iowa include Amana German spoken around the Amana Colonies, and Pennsylvania German, spoken among the Amish in Iowa. The Babel Proclamation of 1918 banned the speaking of German in public. Around Pella, residents of Dutch descent once spoke the Pella Dutch dialect.

== Culture ==
=== Attractions ===
Iowa hosts RAGBRAI, the Register's Annual Great Bicycle Ride Across Iowa, which is a bike across the state river-to-river that attracts thousands of bicyclists and support personnel. It has crossed the state on various routes each year since 1973. Iowa is home to more than 70 wineries, and hosts five regional wine tasting trails. Many Iowa communities hold farmers' markets during warmer months; these are typically weekly events, but larger cities can host multiple markets.

==== Central Iowa ====
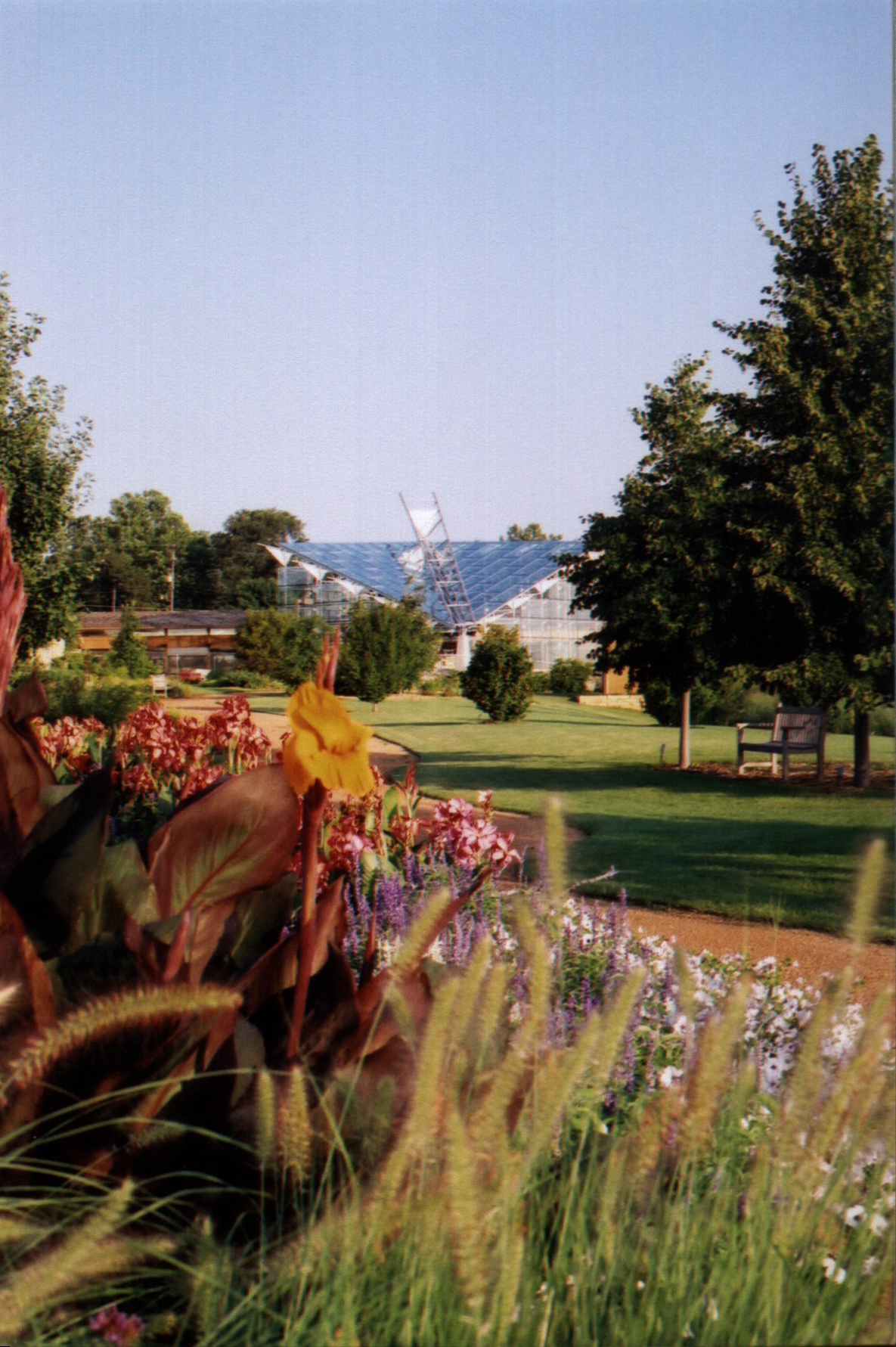
The Christina Reiman Butterfly Wing at Iowa State University, Ames

Des Moines is the largest city and metropolitan area (Note: However, a portion of the larger Omaha–Council Bluffs metropolitan area does extend into the state.) in Iowa and the state's political and economic center. It is home to the Iowa State Capitol, the State Historical Society of Iowa Museum, Drake University, Des Moines Art Center, Greater Des Moines Botanical Garden, Principal Riverwalk, the Iowa State Fair, Terrace Hill, and the World Food Prize. Nearby attractions include Adventureland and Prairie Meadows Racetrack Casino in Altoona, Living History Farms in Urbandale, Trainland USA in Colfax, the National Balloon Classic and National Balloon Museum in Indianola, and the Iowa Speedway and Valle Drive-In in Newton.

Ames is the home of Iowa State University, the Iowa State Center, and Reiman Gardens.

Boone hosts the biennial Farm Progress Show and is home to the Mamie Doud Eisenhower museum, the Boone and Scenic Valley Railroad, and Ledges State Park.

The Meskwaki Settlement west of Tama is the only Native American settlement in Iowa and is host to a large annual Pow-wow.

Madison County is known for its covered bridges. Also in Madison County is the John Wayne Birthplace Museum is in Winterset.

Other communities with vibrant historic downtown areas include Newton, Indianola, Pella, Knoxville, Marshalltown, Perry, and Story City.

==== Eastern Iowa ====
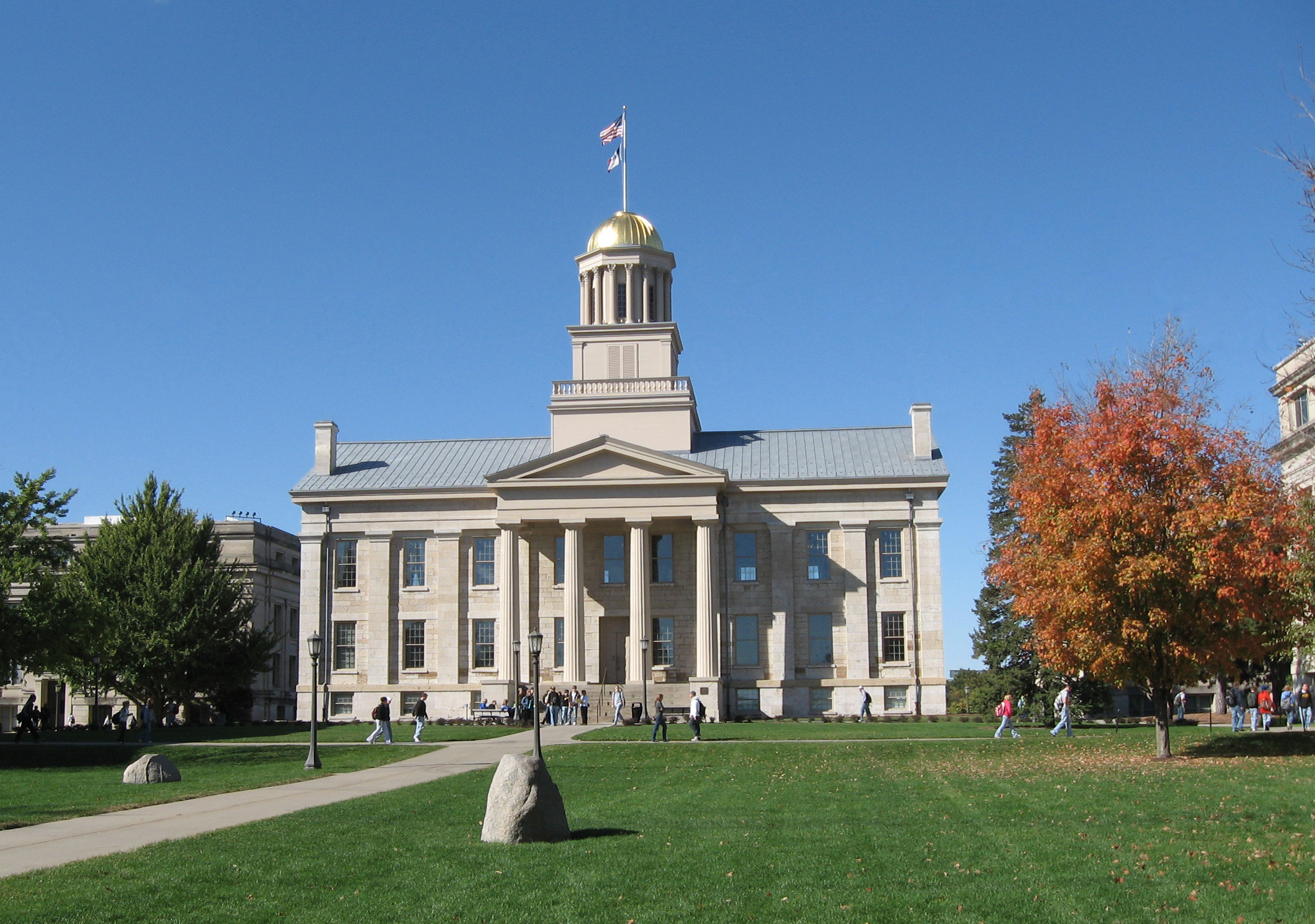
Old Capitol building, Iowa City

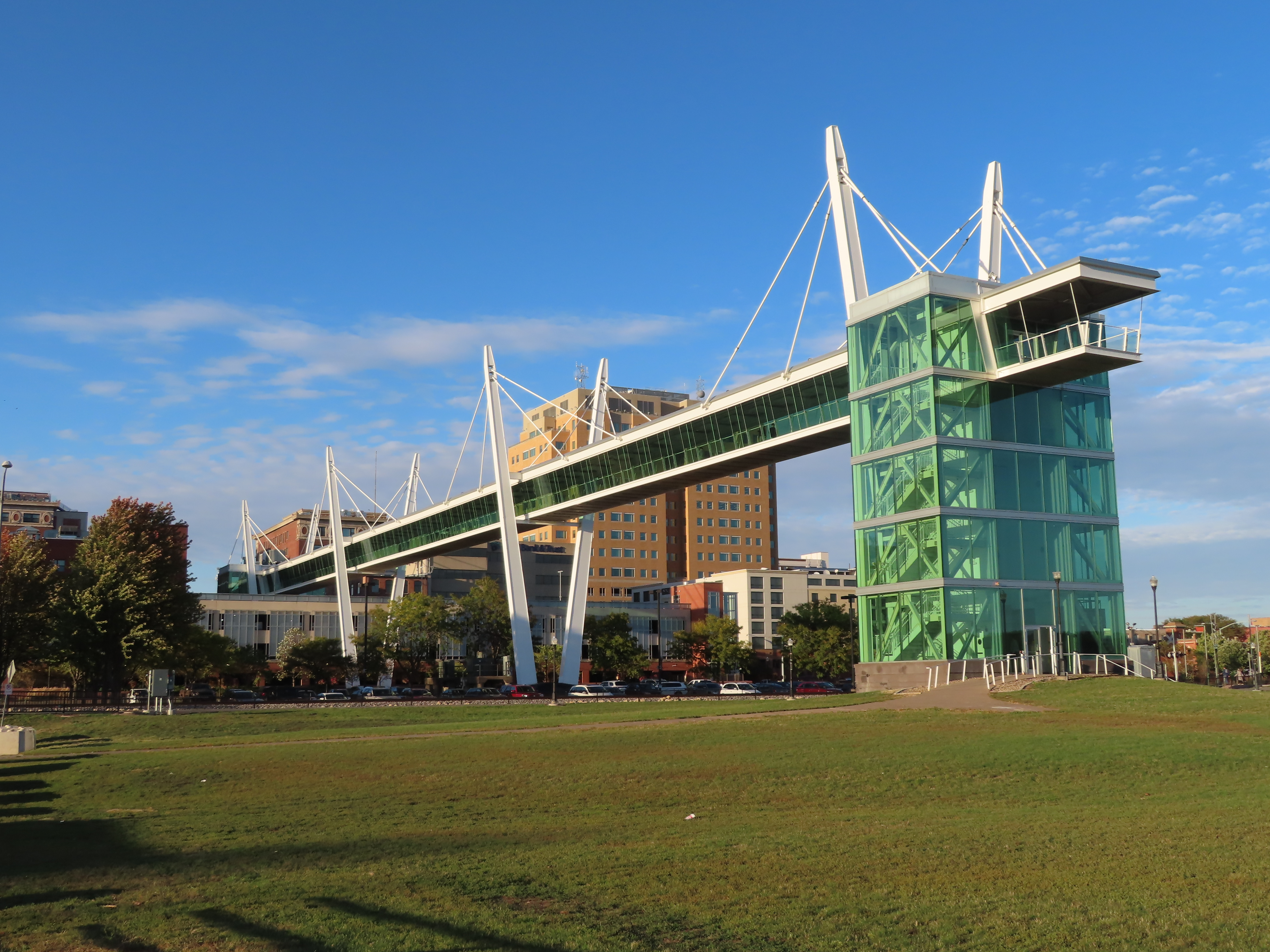
Davenport Skybridge

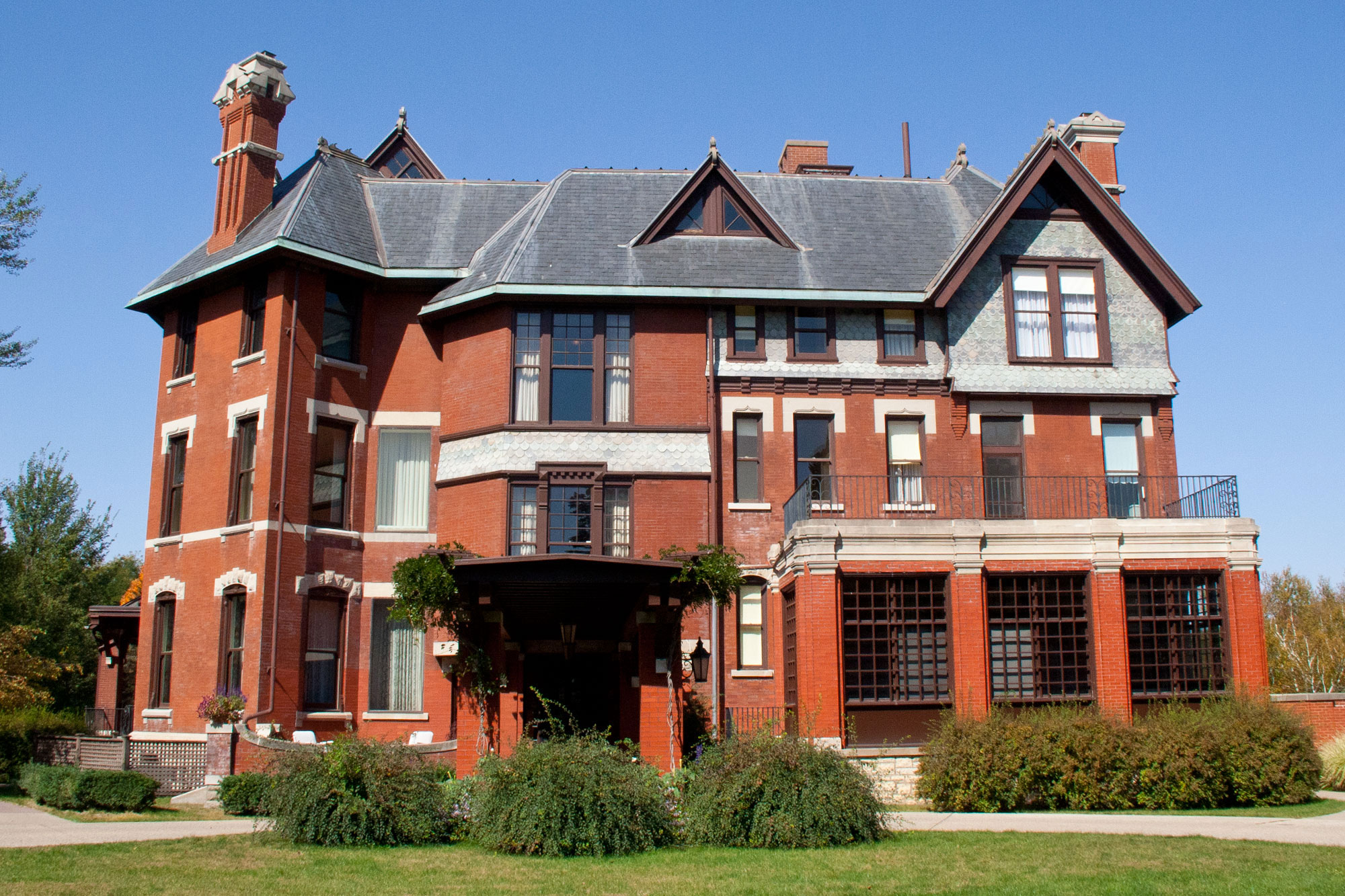
Brucemore, Cedar Rapids

Iowa City is home to the University of Iowa, which includes the Iowa Writers' Workshop, and the Old Capitol building. Because of the extraordinary history in the teaching and sponsoring of creative writing that emanated from the Iowa Writers' Workshop and related programs, Iowa City was the first American city designated by the United Nations as a "City of Literature" in the UNESCO Creative Cities Network.

The Herbert Hoover National Historic Site and Herbert Hoover Presidential Library and Museum are in West Branch.

The Amana Colonies are a group of settlements of German Pietists comprising seven villages listed as National Historic Landmarks.

The Cedar Rapids Museum of Art has collections of paintings by Grant Wood and Marvin Cone. Cedar Rapids is also home to the National Czech & Slovak Museum & Library and Iowa's only National Trust for Historic Preservation Site, Brucemore mansion.

Davenport boasts the Figge Art Museum, River Music Experience, Putnam Museum, Davenport Skybridge, Quad City Symphony Orchestra, Ballet Quad Cities, and plays host to the annual Bix Beiderbecke Memorial Jazz Festival, and the Quad City Air Show, which is the largest airshow in the state.

Other communities with vibrant historic downtown areas include West Liberty, Fairfield, Burlington, Mount Pleasant, Fort Madison, LeClaire, Mount Vernon, Ottumwa, Washington, and Wilton.

Along Interstate 80 near Walcott lies the world's largest truck stop, Iowa 80.

==== Western Iowa ====
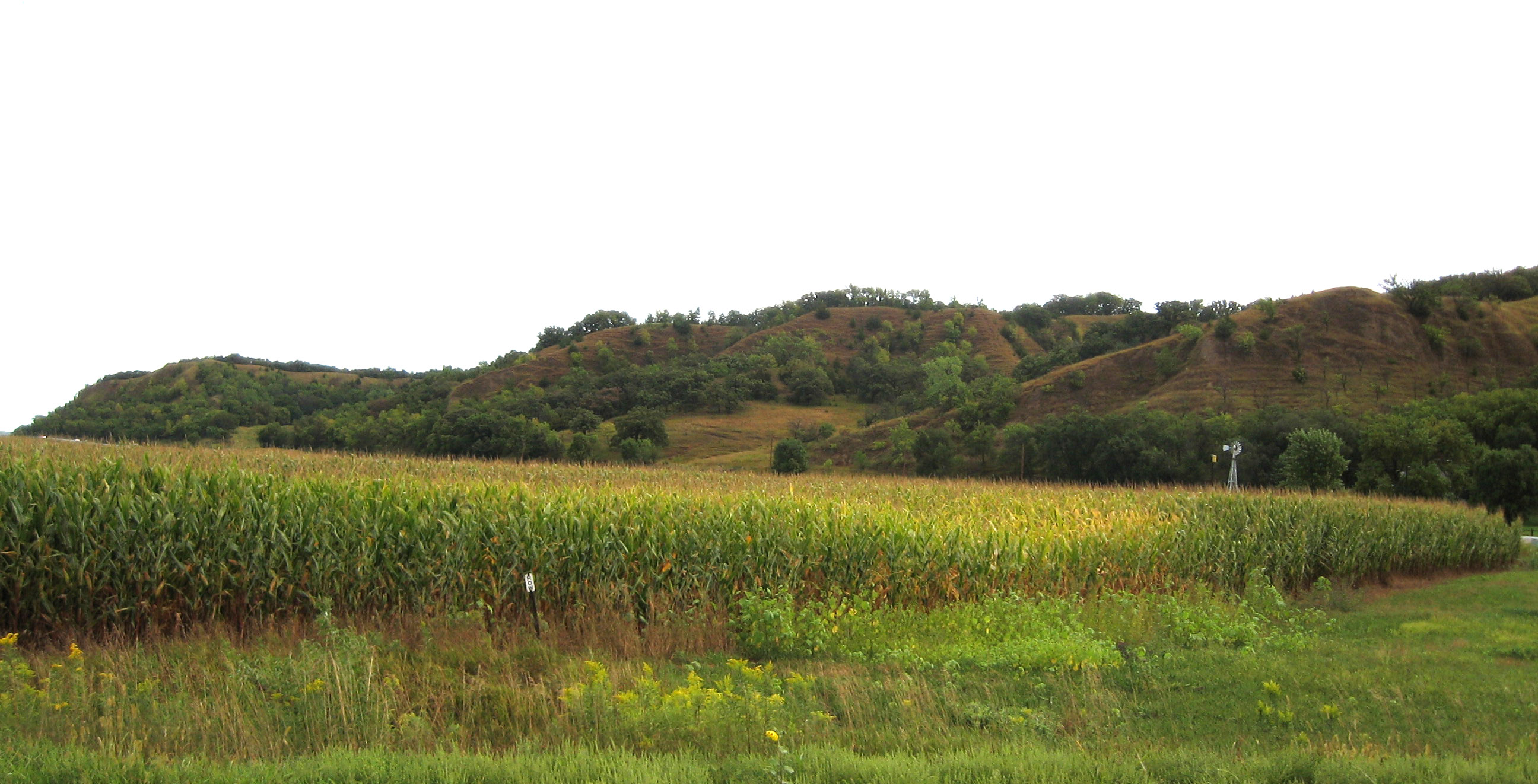
Loess Hills east of Mondamin

Some of the most dramatic scenery in Iowa is found in the unique Loess Hills which are found along Iowa's western border.

Sioux City is the largest city in western Iowa and is found on the convergence of the Missouri, Floyd, and Big Sioux Rivers. The Sioux City Metropolitan Area encompasses areas in three states: Iowa, Nebraska, and South Dakota. Sioux City boasts a revitalized downtown and includes attractions such as the Hard Rock Hotel and Casino, Sergeant Floyd Monument, Sergeant Floyd River Museum, the Tyson Events Center, Southern Hills Mall, the Orpheum Theater, and more. The historic downtown area is also filled with multiple restaurants, bars, and other entertainment venues. Sioux City is home to two higher education institutions, Morningside College and Briar Cliff University. Le Mars is in the northeastern part of the Sioux City Metropolitan Area and is the self-proclaimed "Ice Cream Capital of the World". Le Mars is home to Wells Enterprises, one of the largest ice cream manufacturers in the world. Attractions in Le Mars include the Wells Visitor Center and Ice Cream Parlor, Archie's Wayside (steak house), Bob's Drive Inn, Tonsfeldt Round Barn, Plymouth County Fairgrounds, Plymouth County Museum, and Plymouth County Courthouse. Le Mars hosts multiple ice cream-themed community events each year.

View of Grotto of the Redemption's Lower Arcade: Small Stations of the Cross, West Bend

Council Bluffs, part of the Omaha, Nebraska Metropolitan Area and a hub of southwest Iowa sits at the base of the Loess Hills National Scenic Byway. With three casino resorts, the city also includes such cultural attractions as the Western Hills Trails Center, Union Pacific Railroad Museum, the Grenville M. Dodge House, the Ruth Anne Dodge Memorial, and the Lewis and Clark Monument, with clear views of the Downtown Omaha skyline found throughout the city. The Sanford Museum and Planetarium in Cherokee, the Grotto of the Redemption in West Bend, the Museum of Danish America in Elk Horn, and the Fort Museum and Frontier Village in Fort Dodge are other regional destinations.

The Iowa Great Lakes is made up of multiple small towns, such as Spirit Lake, Arnolds Park, Milford, and Okoboji. Multiple resorts and other tourist attractions are found in and around these towns surrounding the popular lakes. Arnolds Park, one of the oldest amusement parks in the country, is located on Lake Okoboji in Arnolds Park.

Every year in early May, the city of Orange City holds the annual Tulip Festival, a celebration of the strong Dutch heritage in the region.

Northwest Iowa is home to some of the largest concentrations of wind turbine farms in the world. Other western communities with vibrant historic downtown areas include Storm Lake, Spencer, Glenwood, Carroll, Harlan, Atlantic, Red Oak, Denison, Creston, Mount Ayr, Sac City, and Walnut.

==== Northeast and Northern Iowa ====
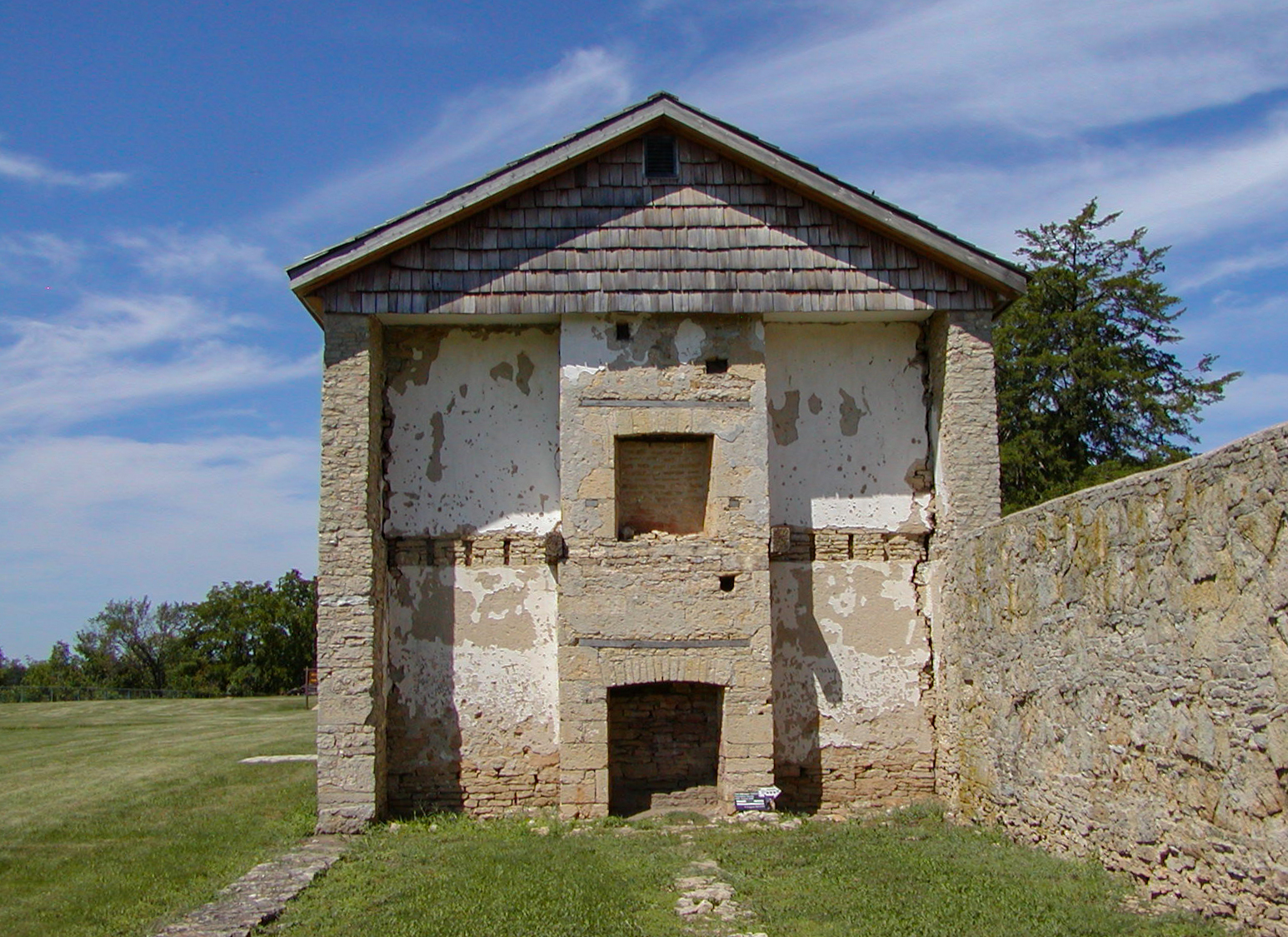
Ruins of historic Fort Atkinson

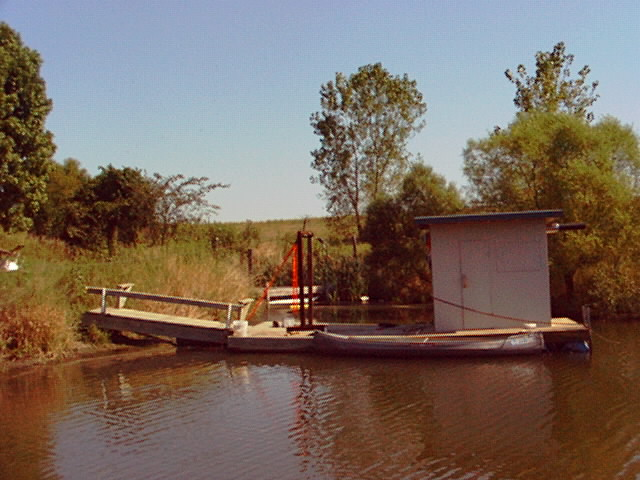
Wood-heated floating sauna on the farm pond

The Driftless Area of northeast Iowa has many steep hills and deep valleys, checkered with forest and terraced fields. Effigy Mounds National Monument in Allamakee and Clayton Counties has the largest assemblage of animal-shaped prehistoric mounds in the world.

Waterloo is home of the Grout Museum and Lost Island Theme Park and is headquarters of the Silos & Smokestacks National Heritage Area. Cedar Falls is home of the University of Northern Iowa.

Dubuque is a regional tourist destination with attractions such as the National Mississippi River Museum and Aquarium and the Port of Dubuque.

Dyersville is home to the famed Field of Dreams baseball diamond. Maquoketa Caves State Park, near Maquoketa, contains more caves than any other state park.

Fort Atkinson State Preserve in Fort Atkinson has the remains of an original 1840s Dragoon fortification.

Fort Dodge is home of The Fort historical museum and the Blanden Art Museum, and host Frontiers Days which celebrate the town history.

Other communities with vibrant historic downtown areas include Decorah, McGregor, Mason City, Elkader, Bellevue, Guttenberg, Algona, Spillville, Charles City, and Independence.

=== Arts ===
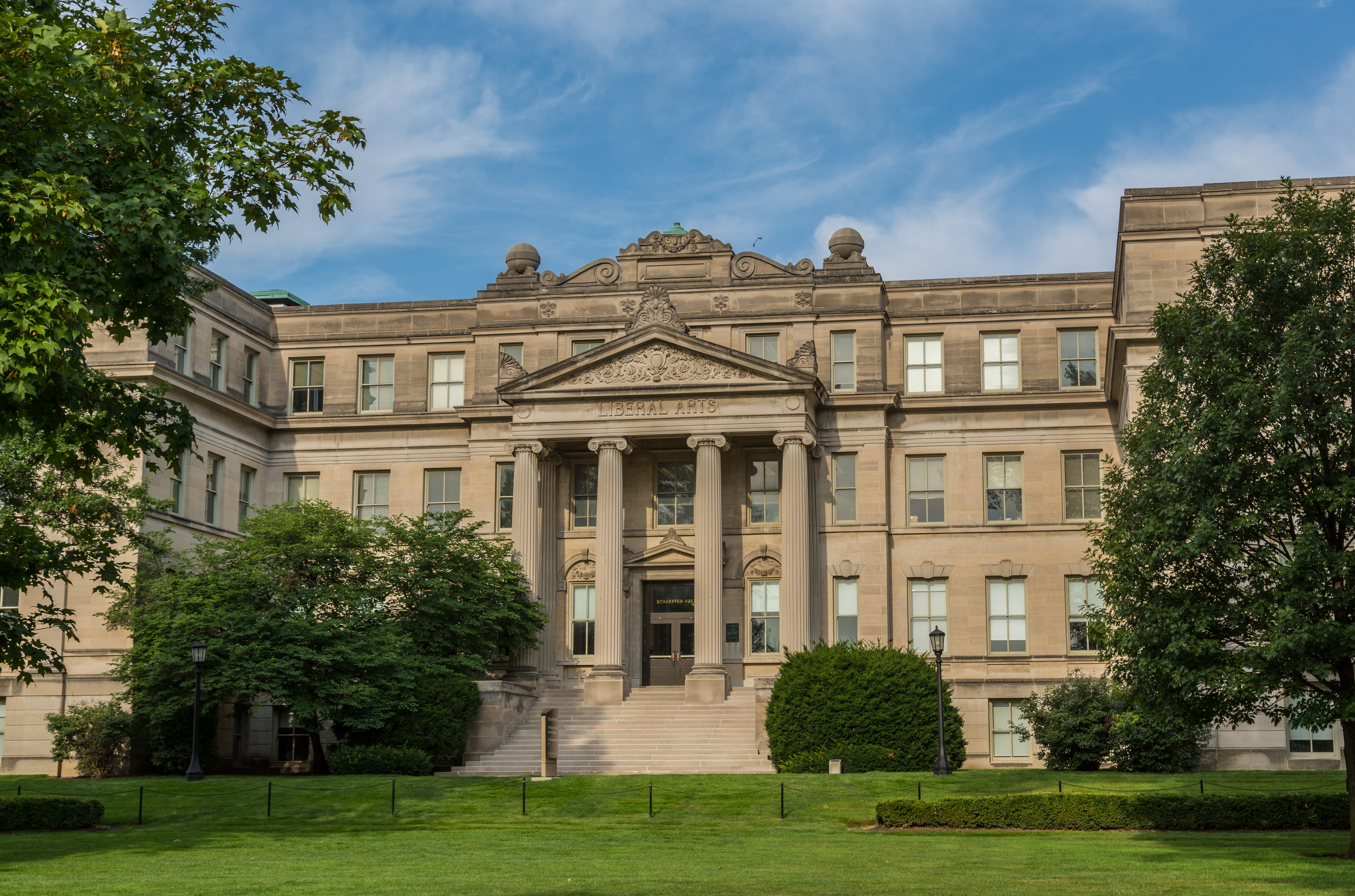
Schaeffer Hall (University of Iowa, Iowa City)

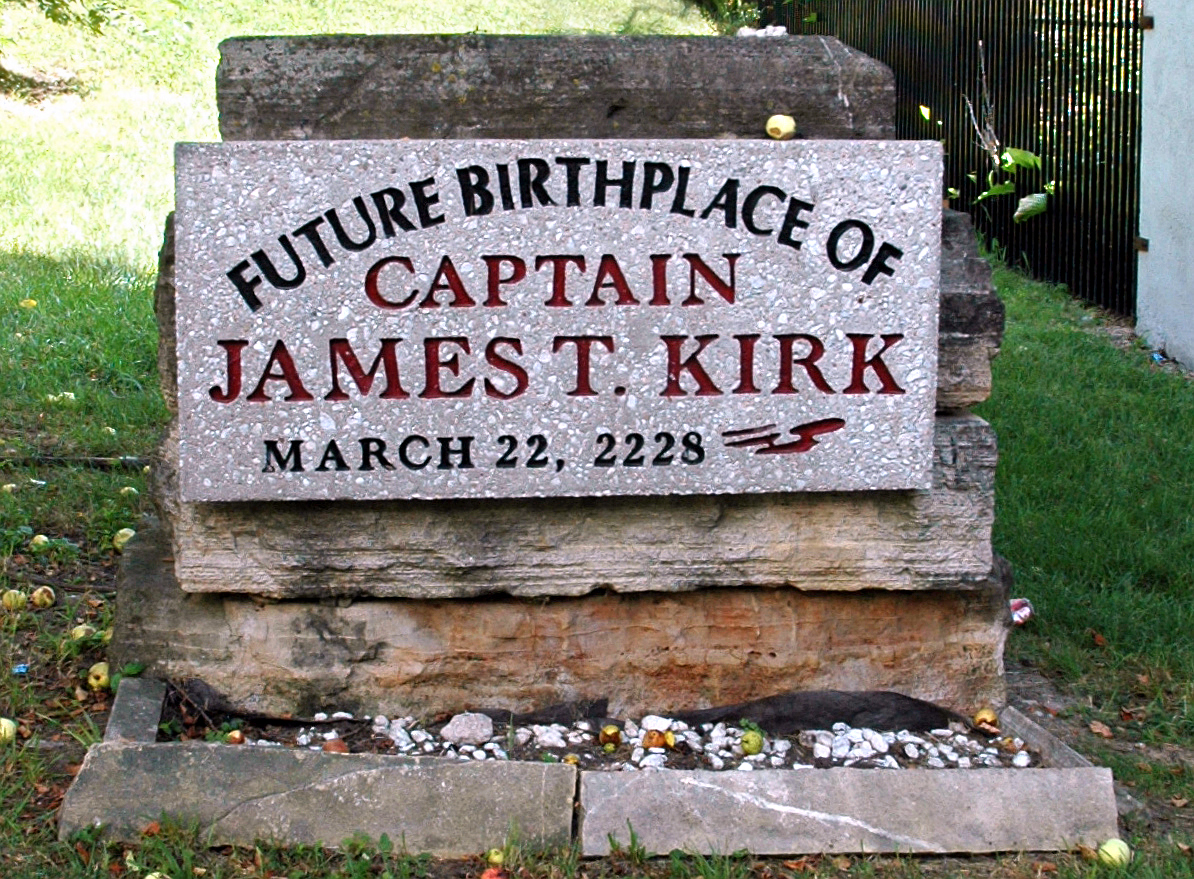
Riverside's "favorite son"

The Clint Eastwood movie The Bridges of Madison County, based on the popular novel of the same name, took place and was filmed in Madison County. What's Eating Gilbert Grape, based on the Peter Hedges novel of the same name, is set in the fictional Iowa town of Endora. Hedges was born in West Des Moines.

Des Moines is home to members of the heavy metal band Slipknot. The state is mentioned in the band's songs, and the album Iowa is named after the state.

=== Sports ===
The state has four major college teams playing in NCAA Division I for all sports. In football, Iowa State University and the University of Iowa compete in the Football Bowl Subdivision (FBS), whereas the University of Northern Iowa and Drake University compete in the Football Championship Subdivision (FCS), with the added distinction that UNI awards football scholarships and Drake does not. Although Iowa has no professional major league sports teams, Iowa has minor league sports teams in baseball, basketball, hockey, and other sports.

The following table shows the Iowa sports teams with average attendance over 8,000. All the following teams are NCAA Division I football, basketball, or wrestling teams:

Iowa sports teams (attendance > 8,000)
Team	Location	Avg. attendance	Season
Iowa Hawkeyes football	Iowa City	69,250	2025
Iowa State Cyclones football	Ames	60,862	2025
Iowa Hawkeyes women's basketball	Iowa City	14,998	2024–25
Iowa State Cyclones men's basketball	Ames	14,062	2024–25
Iowa Hawkeyes men's wrestling	Iowa City	13,640	2024–25
Iowa State Cyclones women's basketball	Ames	9,998	2024–25
Northern Iowa Panthers football	Cedar Falls	9,371	2025
Iowa Hawkeyes men's basketball	Iowa City	9,161	2024–25

==== College sports ====
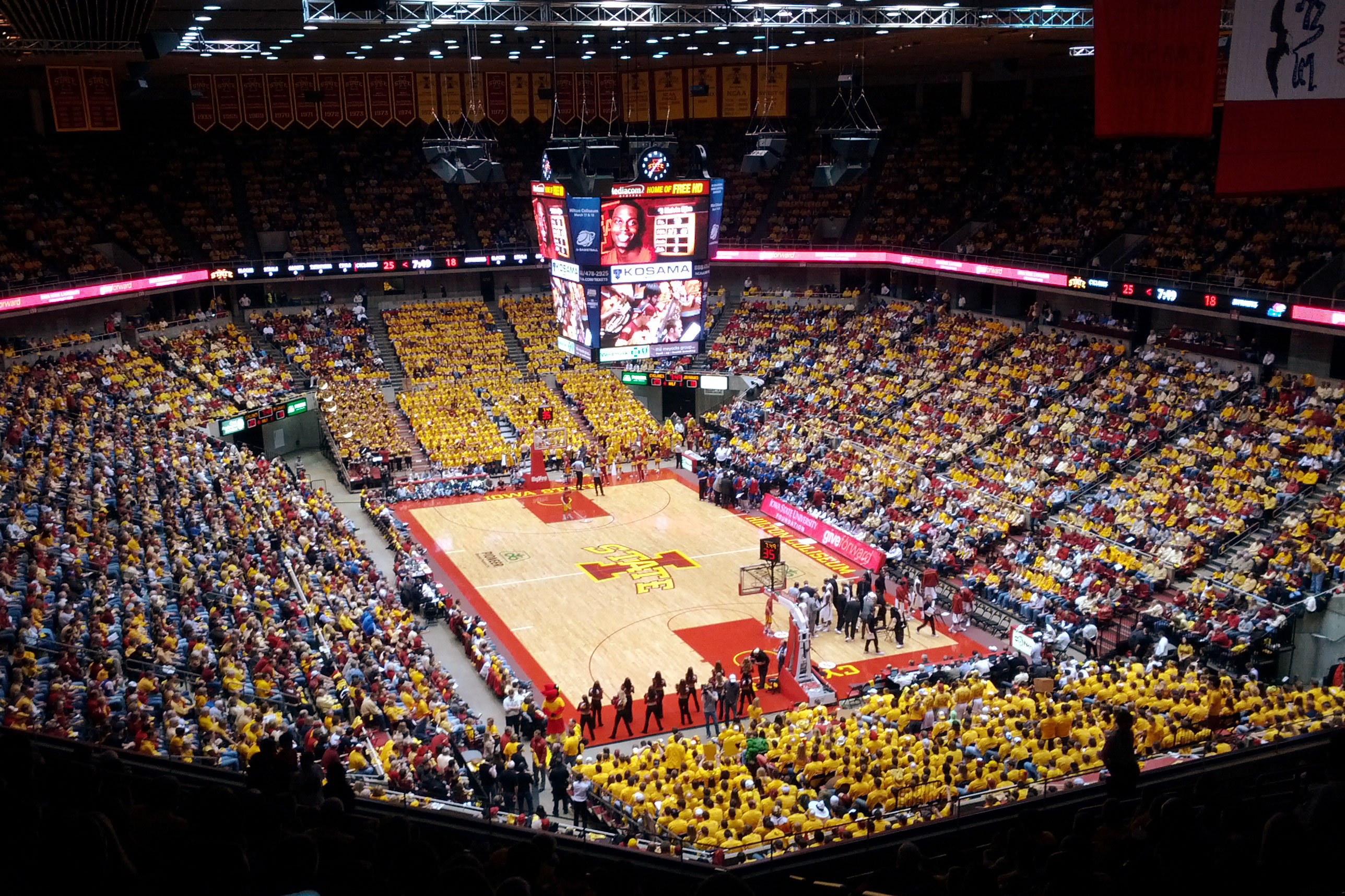
Hilton Coliseum, Iowa State University

The state has four NCAA Division I college teams. Two have football teams that play in the top level of college football, the Football Bowl Subdivision: the University of Iowa Hawkeyes play in the Big Ten Conference and the Iowa State University Cyclones compete in the Big 12 Conference. The two intrastate rivals compete annually for the Cy-Hawk Trophy as part of the Iowa Corn Cy-Hawk Series.

In men's wrestling, the Iowa Hawkeyes and Iowa State Cyclones have won a combined total of over 30 team NCAA Division I titles. The Northern Iowa and Cornell College wrestling teams have also each won one NCAA Division I wrestling team title. Cornell College now competes in NCAA Division III, in which another Iowa school, Wartburg College, has won 16 team titles. In women's wrestling, which became an official NCAA championship sport in 2025–26, 10 Iowa schools field NCAA varsity teams—Iowa (one of only six Division I schools to sponsor the sport), Division II Upper Iowa University, and eight Division III members.

Two other Division I schools play football in the second level of college football, the Football Championship Subdivision. The University of Northern Iowa Panthers (also known as the UNI Panthers) play in the Missouri Valley Conference and Missouri Valley Football Conference (despite the similar names, the conferences are administratively separate, though established a formal partnership in 2025), whereas the Drake University Bulldogs play in the Missouri Valley Conference in most sports and Pioneer League for football.

==== Baseball ====
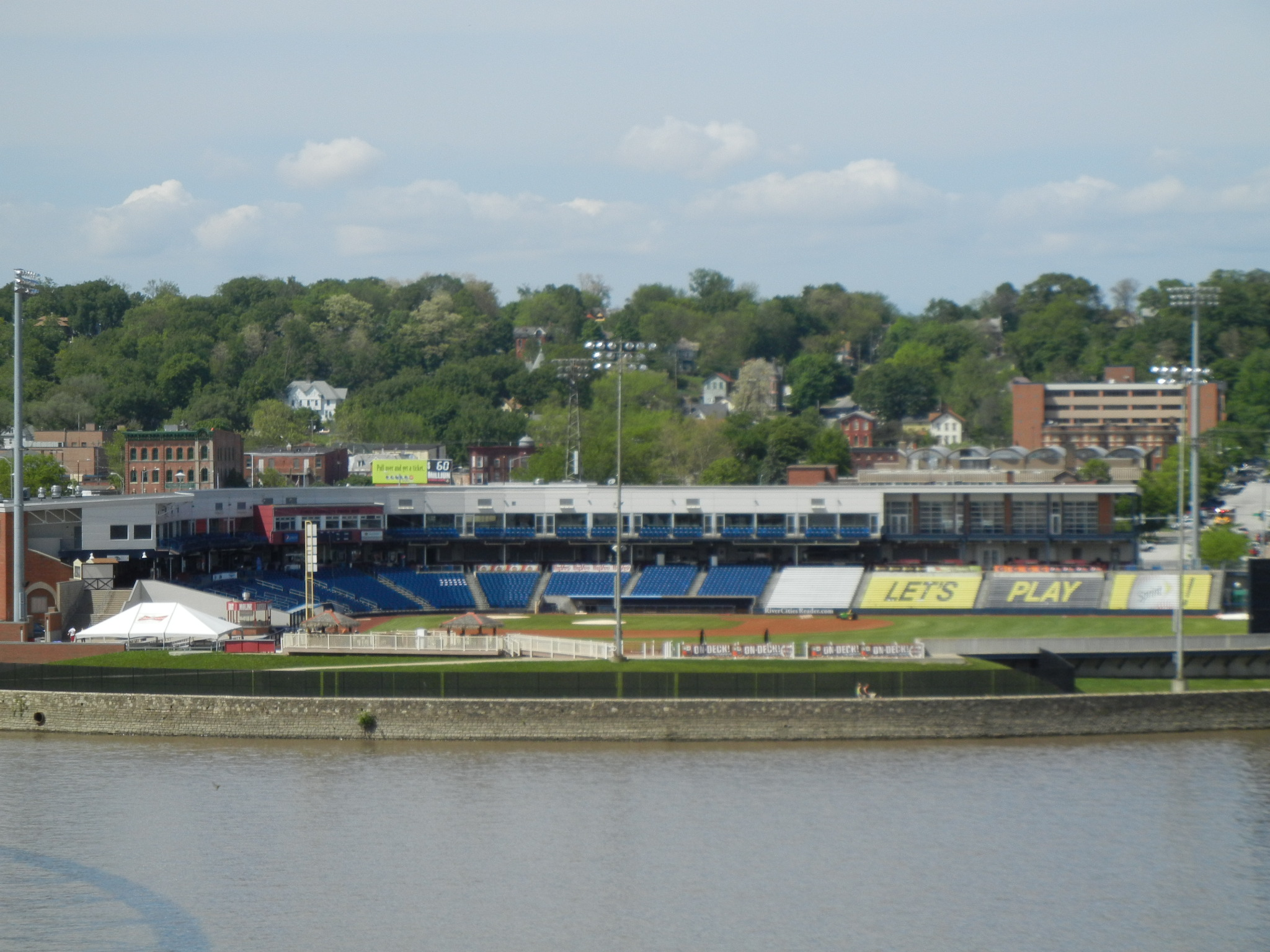
Modern Woodmen Park is home to the Quad Cities baseball team

Des Moines is home to the Iowa Cubs, a Triple-A Minor League Baseball team of the International League and affiliate of the Chicago Cubs. Iowa has two High-A minor league teams in the Midwest League: the Cedar Rapids Kernels (Minnesota Twins) and the Quad Cities River Bandits (Kansas City Royals) who play in Davenport. The Sioux City Explorers are part of the American Association of Professional Baseball.

==== Ice hockey ====
Des Moines is home to the Iowa Wild, who are affiliated with the Minnesota Wild and are members of the American Hockey League. Coralville has an ECHL team called the Iowa Heartlanders that started playing in the 2021–22 season. The Heartlanders are also an affiliate of the Minnesota Wild.

The United States Hockey League has five teams in Iowa: the Cedar Rapids RoughRiders, Sioux City Musketeers, Waterloo Black Hawks, Des Moines Buccaneers, and the Dubuque Fighting Saints. The North Iowa Bulls of the North American Hockey League (NAHL) and the Mason City Toros of the North American 3 Hockey League (NA3HL) both play in Mason City.

==== Soccer ====
- The Des Moines Menace of the USL League Two play their home games at Valley Stadium in West Des Moines, Iowa.
- The Cedar Rapids Inferno Soccer Club of the Midwest Premier League play their home games at Robert W. Plaster Athletic Complex at Mount Mercy University
- The Iowa Raptors FC of the United Premier Soccer League play their home games at Prairie High School in Cedar Rapids, Iowa
- Union Dubuque F.C. of the Midwest Premier League

==== Other sports ====
Iowa has two professional basketball teams. The Iowa Wolves, an NBA G League team that plays in Des Moines, is owned and affiliated with the Minnesota Timberwolves of the NBA. The Sioux City Hornets play in the American Basketball Association.

Iowa has three professional football teams. The Sioux City Bandits play in the Champions Indoor Football league. The Iowa Barnstormers play in the Indoor Football League at Casey's Center in Des Moines. The Cedar Rapids Titans play in the Indoor Football League at the U.S. Cellular Center.

The Iowa Speedway oval track in Newton has hosted auto racing championships such as the IndyCar Series, NASCAR Xfinity Series and NASCAR Truck Series since 2006. Also, the Knoxville Raceway dirt track hosts the Knoxville Nationals, one of the classic sprint car racing events.

The John Deere Classic is a PGA Tour golf event held in the Quad Cities since 1971. The Principal Charity Classic is a Champions Tour event since 2001. The Des Moines Golf and Country Club hosted the 1999 U.S. Senior Open and the 2017 Solheim Cup.

== Economy ==
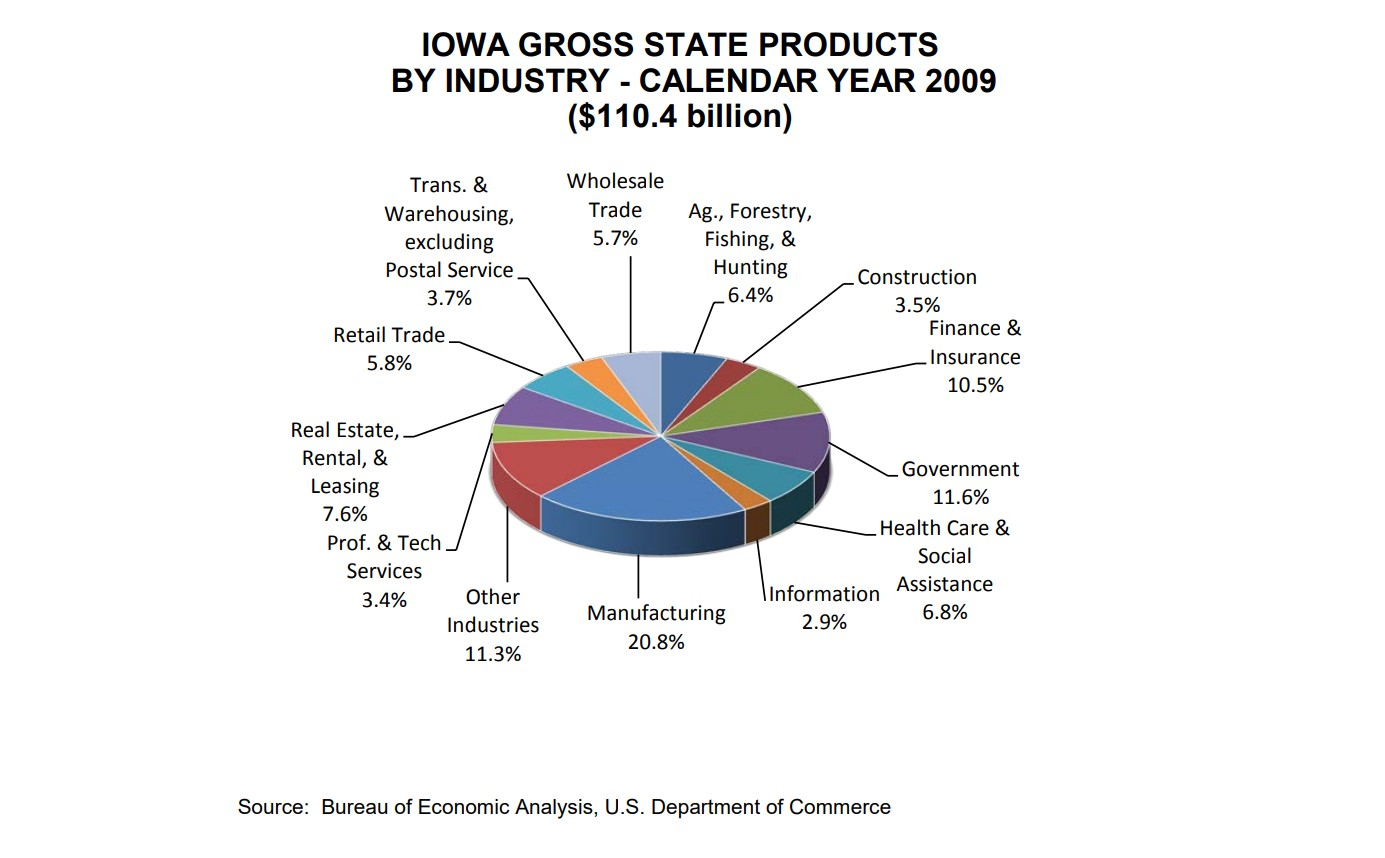
Iowa gross state products by industry, 2009

In 2025, Iowa's gross domestic product was $277.1 billion and the state's per capita personal income was $68,326. On July 2, 2009, Standard & Poor's rated Iowa's credit as AAA (the highest of its credit ratings, held by only 11 U.S. state governments).

In 2016, the total employment of the state's population was 1,354,487, and the total number of employer establishments was 81,563. In 2025, small businesses made up 99.3% of all businesses in the state, employing 46.0% of Iowa's work force.

CNBC's list of "Top States for Business in 2010" has recognized Iowa as the sixth best state in the nation. Scored in 10 individual categories, Iowa was ranked first when it came to the "Cost of Doing Business"; this includes all taxes, utility costs, and other costs associated with doing business. Iowa was also ranked 10th in "Economy", 12th in "Business Friendliness", 16th in "Education", 17th in both "Cost of Living" and "Quality of Life", 20th in "Workforce", 29th in "Technology and Innovation", 32nd in "Transportation" and the lowest ranking was 36th in "Access to Capital".

While Iowa is often viewed as a farming state, agriculture is a relatively small portion of the state's diversified economy, with manufacturing, biotechnology, finance and insurance services, and government services contributing substantially to Iowa's economy. This economic diversity has helped Iowa weather the late 2000s recession better than most states, with unemployment substantially lower than the rest of the nation.

As of May 2025, the state's unemployment rate was 3.6%.

=== Manufacturing ===
Manufacturing is the largest sector of Iowa's economy, with $20.8 billion (21%) of Iowa's 2003 gross state product. Major manufacturing sectors include food processing, heavy machinery, and agricultural chemicals. Sixteen percent of Iowa's workforce is dedicated to manufacturing. Food processing is the largest component of manufacturing. Besides processed food, industrial outputs include machinery, electric equipment, chemical products, publishing, and primary metals. Companies with direct or indirect processing facilities in Iowa include ConAgra Foods, Wells Blue Bunny, Barilla, Heinz, Tone's Spices, General Mills, and Quaker Oats. Meatpacker Tyson Foods has 11 locations, second only to its headquarter state Arkansas.

Major non-food manufacturing firms with production facilities in Iowa include 3M, Arconic, Amana Corporation, Emerson Electric, The HON Company, SSAB, John Deere, Lennox Manufacturing, Pella Corporation, Procter & Gamble, Vermeer Company, and Winnebago Industries.

=== Agriculture ===
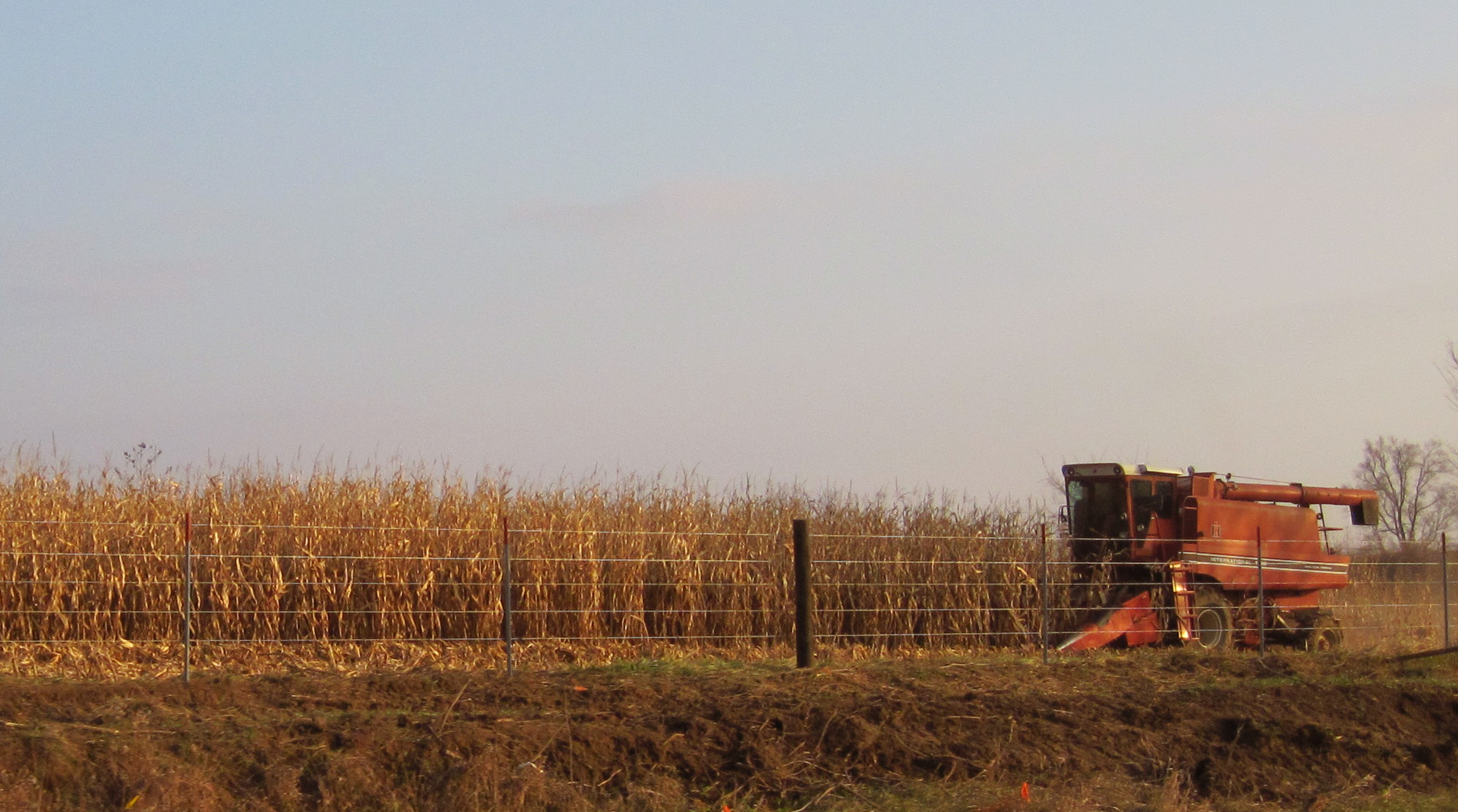
Harvesting corn in Jones County

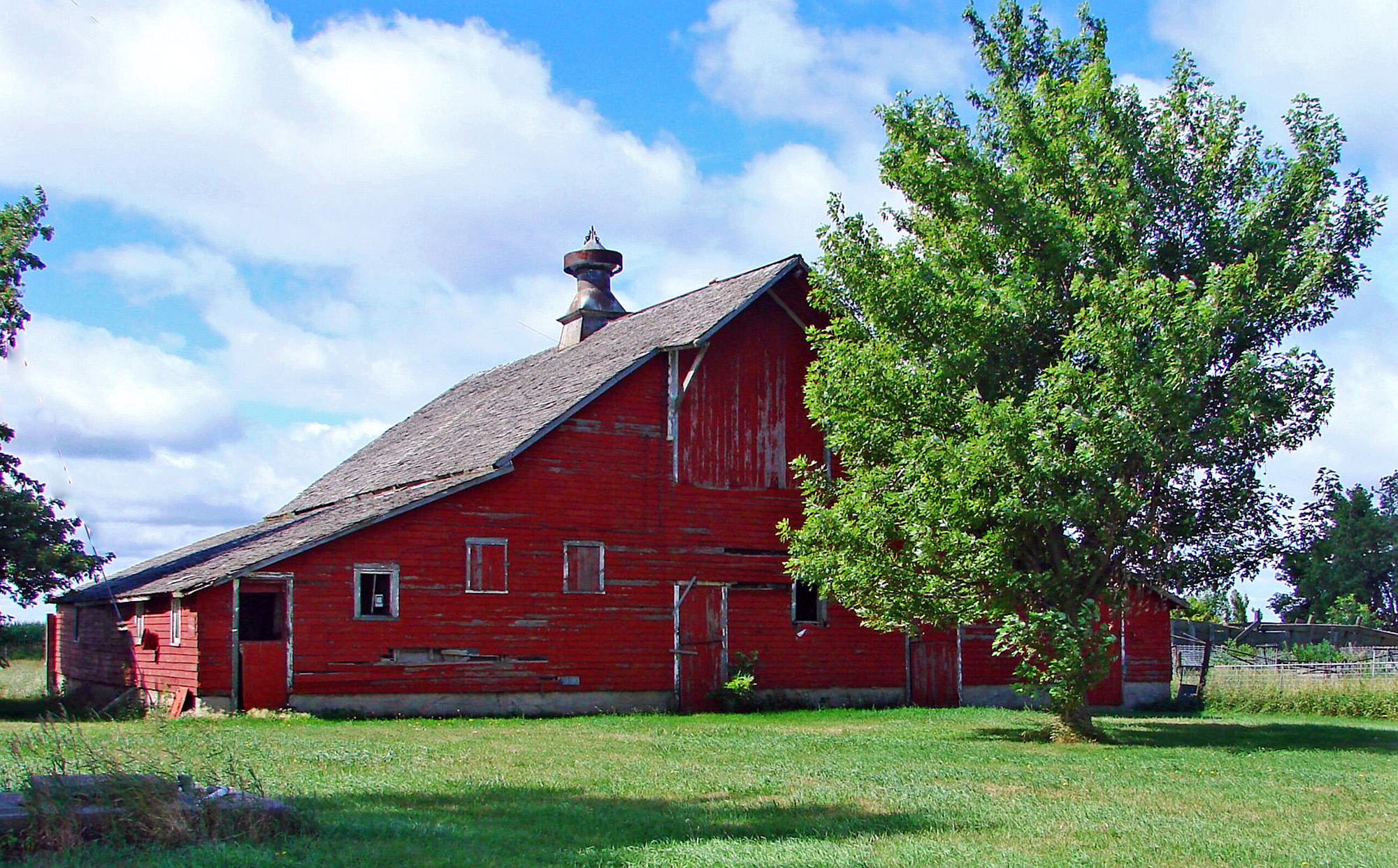
Farm in rural Northwest Iowa

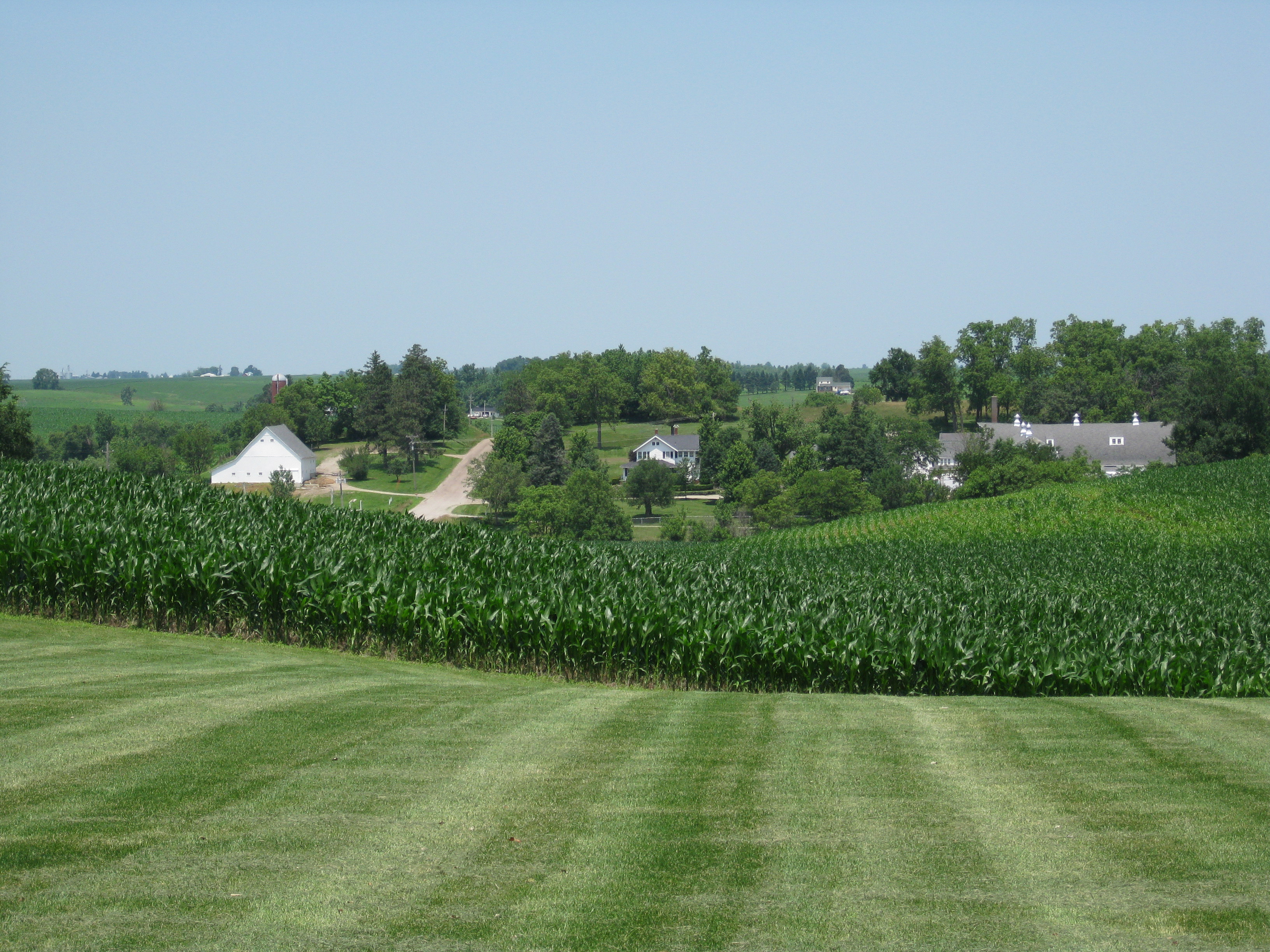
Central Iowa cornfield and dairy in June

Industrial-scale, commodity agriculture predominates in much of the state. Iowa's main conventional agricultural commodities are hogs, with about 22.6 million hogs in 8,000 facilities large enough to require manure management plans in March 2018, outnumbering Iowans by more than 7 to 1, corn, soybeans, oats, cattle, eggs, and dairy products. Iowa is the nation's largest producer of ethanol and corn and some years is the largest grower of soybeans. In 2008, the 92,600 farms in Iowa produced 19% of the nation's corn, 17% of the soybeans, 30% of the hogs, and 14% of the eggs. As of 2009 major Iowa agricultural product processors included Archer Daniels Midland, Cargill, Inc., Diamond V Mills, and Quaker Oats.

During the 21st century Iowa has seen growth in the organic farming sector. Iowa ranks fifth in the nation in total number of organic farms. In 2016, there were about 732 organic farms in the state, an increase of about 5% from the previous year, and 103,136 organic acres, an increase of 9,429 from the previous year. Iowa has also seen an increase in demand for local, sustainably-grown food. Northeast Iowa, part of the Driftless Area, has led the state in development of its regional food system and grows and consumes more local food than any other region in Iowa.

Iowa's Driftless Region is also home to the nationally recognized Seed Savers Exchange, a non-profit seed bank housed at an 890-acre heritage farm near Decorah, in the northeast corner of the state. The largest nongovernmental seed bank of its kind in the United States, Seed Savers Exchange safeguards more than 20,000 varieties of rare, heirloom seeds.

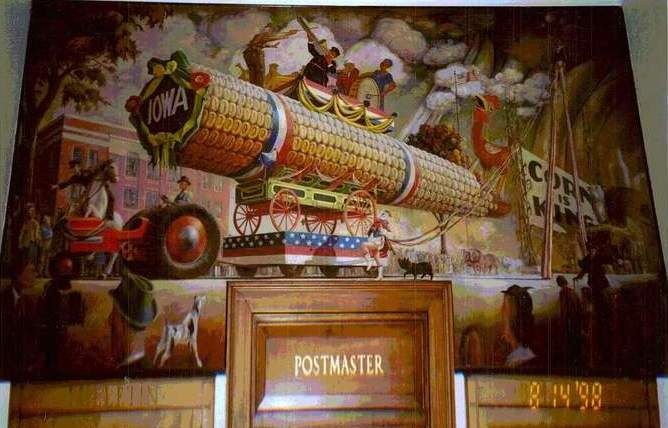
Mural in Mt. Ayr Post Office, "The Corn Parade" by Orr C. Fischer, which was commissioned as part of the New Deal

As of 2007, the direct production and sale of conventional agricultural commodities contributed only about 3.5% of Iowa's gross state product. In 2002 the impact of the indirect role of agriculture in Iowa's economy, including agriculture-affiliated business, was calculated at 16.4% in terms of value added and 24.3% in terms of total output. This was lower than the economic impact of non-farm manufacturing, which accounted for 22.4% of total value added and 26.5% of total output.

=== Health insurance ===
As of 2014, there were 16 organizations offering health insurance products in Iowa, per the State of Iowa Insurance Division. Iowa was fourth out of ten states with the biggest drop in competition levels of health insurance between 2010 and 2011, per the 2013 annual report on the level of competition in the health insurance industry by the American Medical Association using 2011 data from HealthLeaders-Interstudy, the most comprehensive source of data on enrollment in health maintenance organization (HMO), preferred provider organization (PPO), point-of-service (POS) and consumer-driven health care plans. According to the AMA annual report from 2007 Wellmark Blue Cross Blue Shield had provided 71% of the state's health insurance.

The Iowa Insurance Division "Annual report to the Iowa Governor and the Iowa Legislature" from November 2014 looked at the 95% of health insurers by premium, which are 10 companies. It found Wellmark Inc. to dominate the three health insurance markets it examined (individual, small group and large group) at 52–67%. Wellmark HealthPlan of Iowa and Wellmark Inc had the highest risk-based capital percentages of all 10 providers at 1158% and 1132%, respectively. Rising RBC is an indication of profits.

=== Other sectors ===
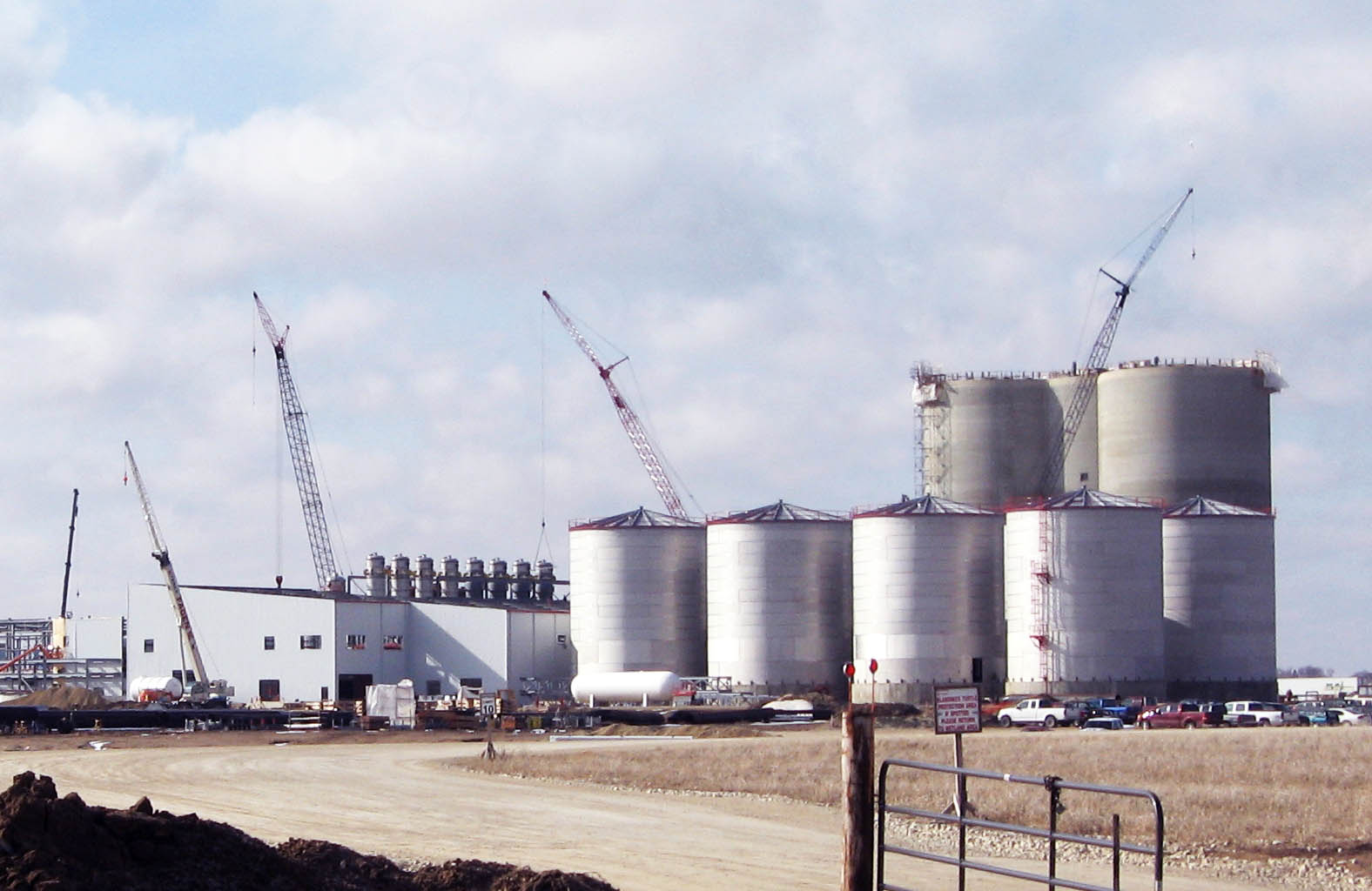
Ethanol plant under construction in Butler County

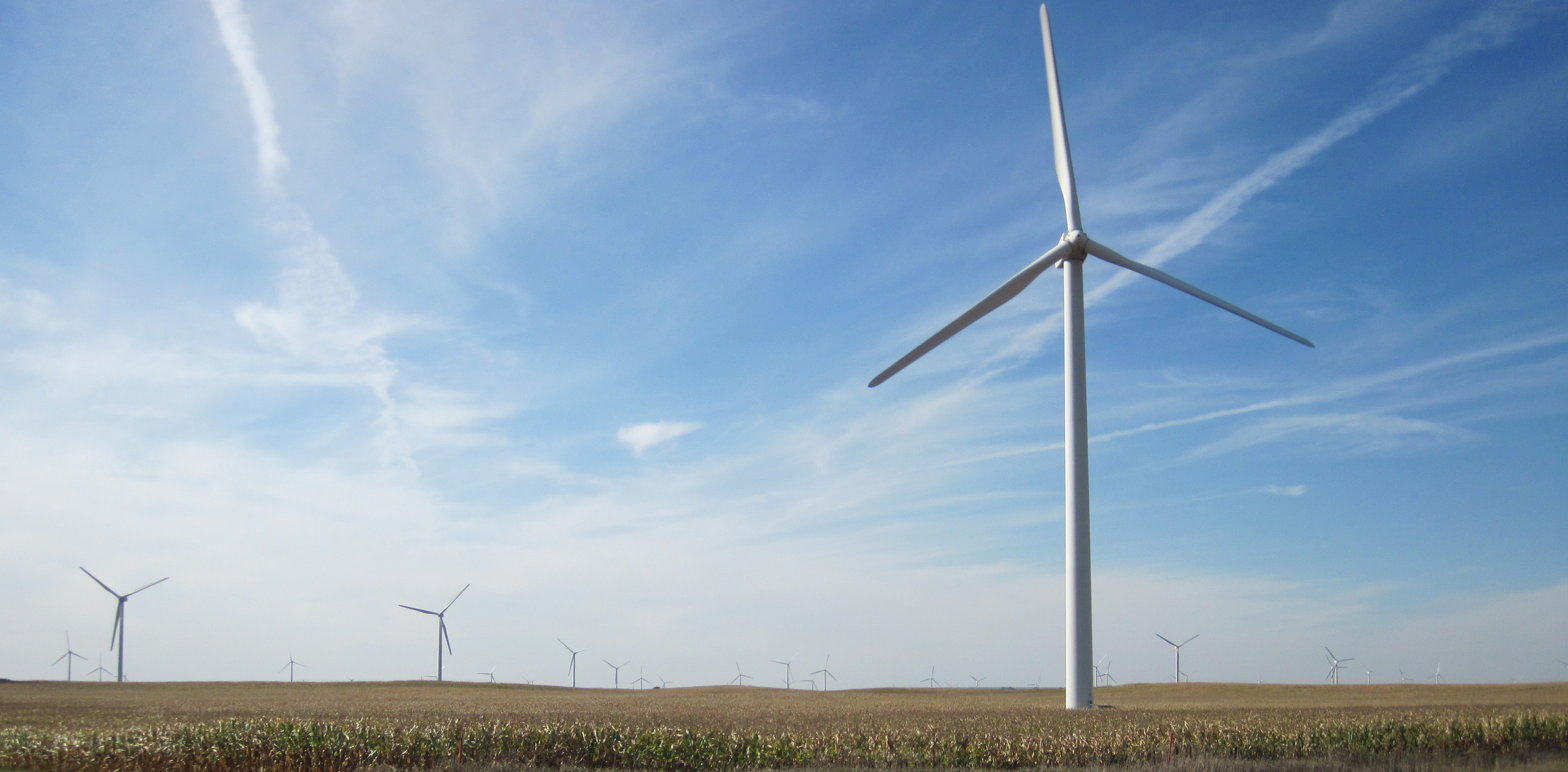
Wind turbines near Williams, Iowa

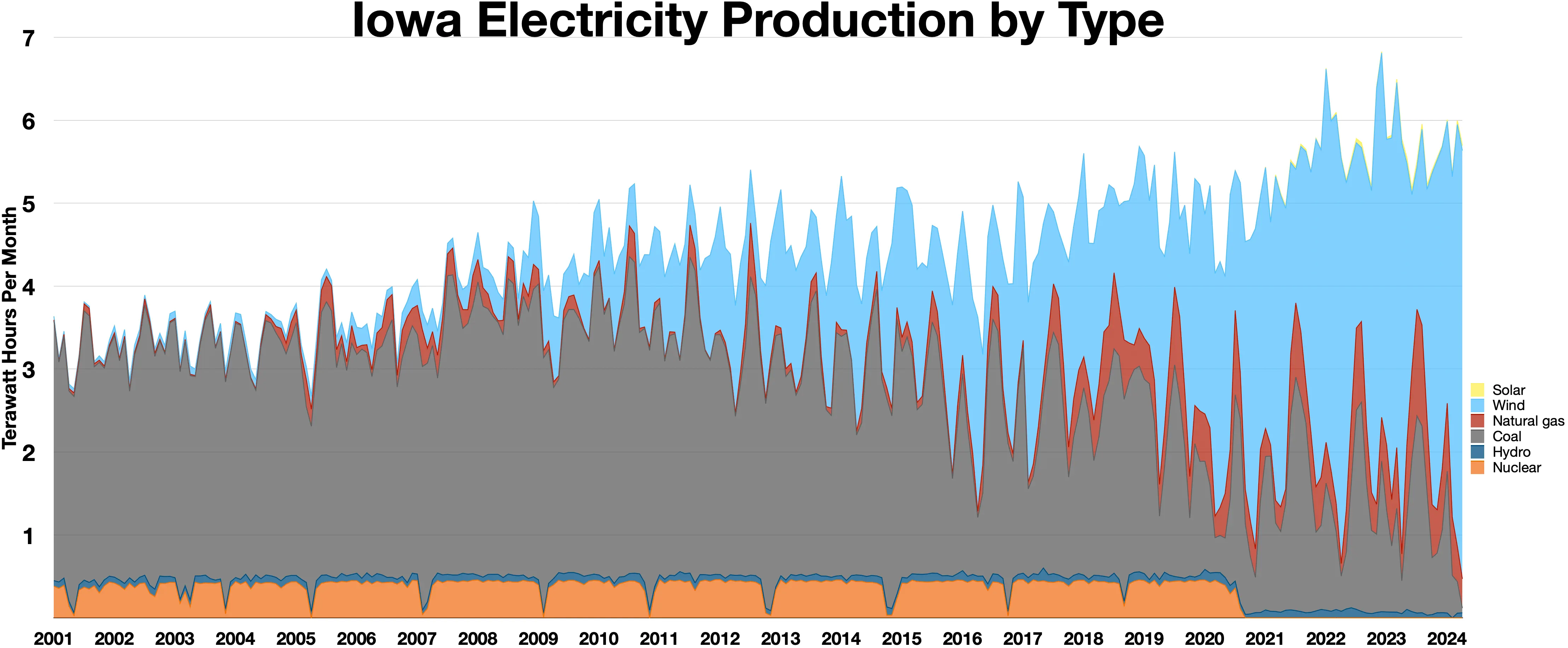
Iowa electricity production by type

Iowa has a strong financial and insurance sector, with approximately 6,100 firms, including AEGON, Nationwide Group, Aviva USA, Farm Bureau Financial Services, GreatAmerica Financial Services, Voya Financial, Marsh Affinity Group, MetLife, Principal Financial Group, Principal Capital Management, Wells Fargo, and Greenstate Credit Union (formerly University of Iowa Community Credit Union).

Iowa is host to at least two business incubators, Iowa State University Research Park and the BioVentures Center at the University of Iowa. The Research Park hosts about 50 companies, among them NewLink Genetics, which develops cancer immunotherapeutics, and the U.S. animal health division of Boehringer Ingelheim, Vetmedica.

Ethanol production consumes about a third of Iowa's corn production, and renewable fuels account for eight percent of the state's gross domestic product. A total of 39 ethanol plants produced 3.1 billion US gallons (12,000,000 m^{3}) of fuel in 2009.

Renewable energy has become a major economic force in northern and western Iowa, with wind turbine electrical generation increasing rapidly since 1990. In 2019, wind power in Iowa accounted for 42% of electrical energy produced, and 10,201 megawatts of generating capacity had been installed at the end of the year. Iowa ranked first of U.S. states in percentage of total power generated by wind and second in wind generating capacity behind Texas. Major producers of turbines and components in Iowa include Acciona Energy of West Branch, TPI Composites of Newton, and Siemens Energy of Fort Madison.

In 2016, Iowa was the headquarters for three of the top 2,000 companies for revenue. They include Principal Financial, Rockwell Collins, and American Equity Investment. Iowa is also headquarters to other companies including Hy-Vee, Pella Corporation, Workiva, Vermeer Company, Kum & Go gas stations, Von Maur, Pioneer Hi-Bred, and Fareway.

Gambling comprises a major part of Iowa's tourism industry, generating $1.476 billion per year as of 2018.

As of 2025, Iowa had 64 data centers; Google in Council Bluffs and Cedar Rapids, Apple in Waukee, Meta in Altoona, Iowa and Microsoft has six data centers in West Des Moines.

=== Taxation ===
Tax is collected by the Iowa Department of Revenue.

Iowa imposes taxes on net state income of individuals, estates, and trusts. There are nine income tax brackets, ranging from 0.36% to 8.98%, as well as four corporate income tax brackets ranging from 6% to 12%, giving Iowa the country's highest marginal corporate tax rate. The state sales tax rate is 6%, with non-prepared food having no tax. Iowa has one local option sales tax that may be imposed by counties after an election. Property tax is levied on the taxable value of real property. Iowa has more than 2,000 taxing authorities. Most property is taxed by more than one taxing authority. The tax rate differs in each locality and is a composite of county, city or rural township, school district and special levies. Iowa allows its residents to deduct their federal income taxes from their state income taxes.

== Education ==
=== Primary and secondary schools ===
Iowa was one of the leading states in the high school movement, and continues to be among the top educational performers today.

The four-year graduation rate for high schoolers was 91.3% in 2017. Iowa's schools are credited with the highest graduation rate in the nation as of 2019. Iowa has 333 school districts, 1,329 school buildings and has the 14th lowest student-to-teacher ratio of 14.2. Teacher pay is ranked 22nd, with the average salary being $55,647.

As of 2015 transportation spending is a significant part of the budgets of rural school districts as many are geographically large and must transport students across vast distances. This reduces the amount of money spent on other aspects of the districts.

The state's oldest functioning school building is located in Bellevue in the historic Jackson County Courthouse which has been in continuous use as a school since 1848.

=== Colleges and universities ===
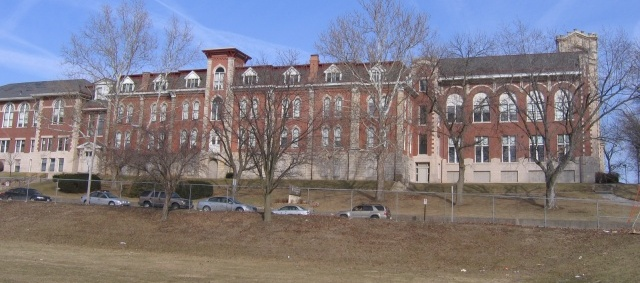
Palmer Chiropractic College in Davenport is the first school of chiropractic in the world.

The Iowa Board of Regents is composed of nine citizen volunteers appointed by the governor to provide policymaking, coordination, and oversight of the state's three public universities, two special K–12 schools, and affiliated centers.

The special K–12 schools include the Iowa School for the Deaf in Council Bluffs and the Iowa Braille and Sight Saving School in Vinton. Both Iowa State University and The University of Iowa are research universities with The University of Iowa also being a member of the Association of American Universities. In addition to the three state universities, Iowa has multiple private colleges and universities.

== Health ==
The life expectancy of Iowa is 77.9 years in 2022 The state's rural population are more susceptible to diseases related to food insecurity, due to a lack of healthy food sources. The leading cause of death in Iowa is heart disease, followed by cancer and fatalities relating to unintentional injuries.

Iowa ranks eleventh among states in terms of proportion of obesity, with 37% of the state being affected by it. Around 9% of Iowans suffer from diabetes, costing the state $2 billion.

== Transportation ==
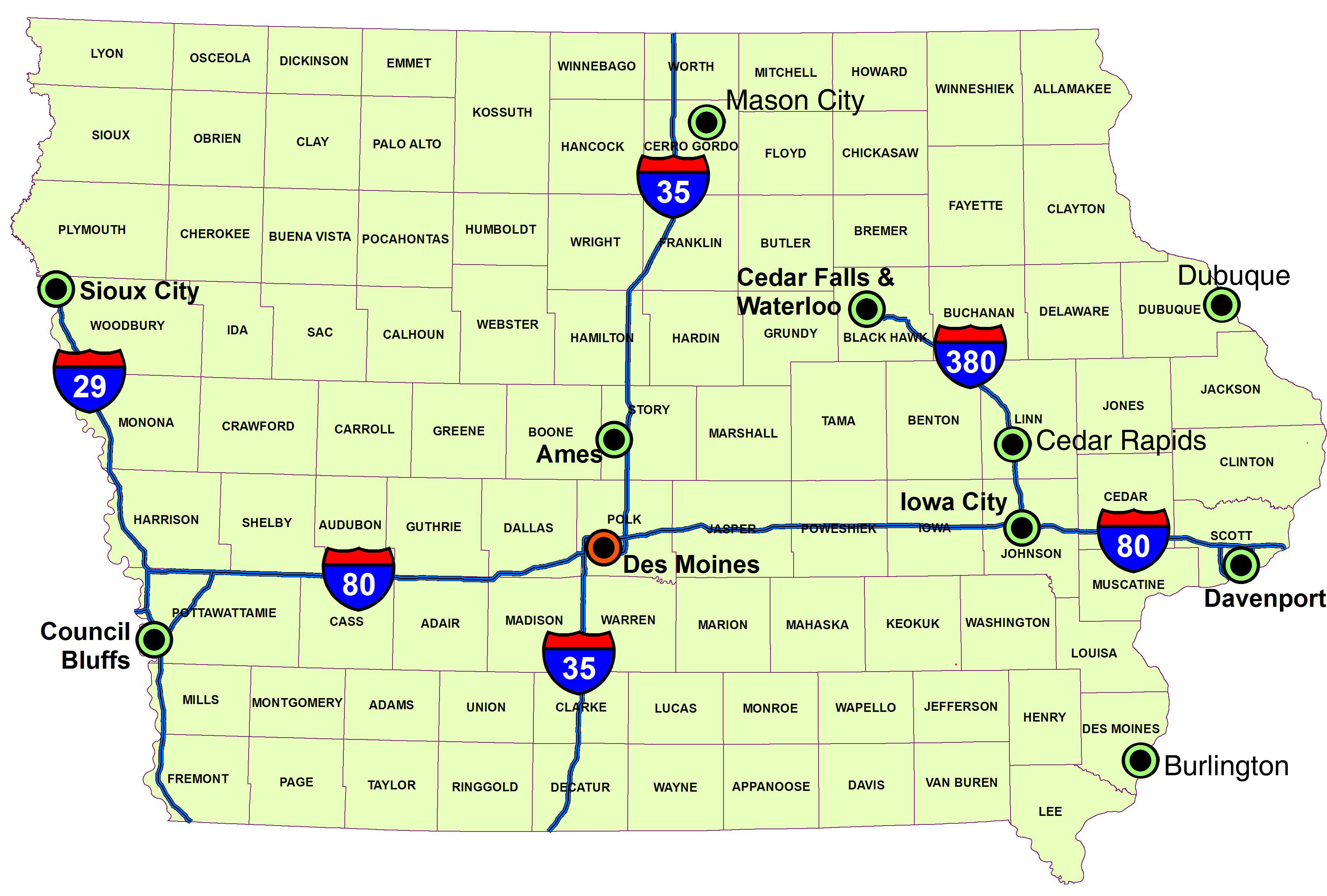
Iowa's major interstates, larger cities, and counties

=== Interstate highways ===
Iowa has four primary interstate highways. I-29 travels along the state's western edge through Council Bluffs and Sioux City. I-35 travels from the Missouri state line to the Minnesota state line through the state's center, including Des Moines. I-74 begins at I-80 just northeast of Davenport. I-80 travels from the Nebraska state line to the Illinois state line through the center of the state, including Council Bluffs, Des Moines, Iowa City, and the Quad Cities. I-380 is an auxiliary Interstate Highway, which travels from I-80 near Iowa City through Cedar Rapids ending in Waterloo and is part of the Avenue of the Saints highway. Iowa is among the few jurisdictions where municipalities install speed cameras on interstate highways providing a substantial revenue source from out of state drivers.

=== Airports with scheduled flights ===
Iowa is served by several regional airports including the Des Moines International Airport, the Eastern Iowa Airport, in Cedar Rapids, Quad City International Airport, in Moline, Illinois, and Eppley Airfield, in Omaha, Nebraska. Smaller airports in the state include the Council Bluffs Municipal Airport, Davenport Municipal Airport (Iowa), Dubuque Regional Airport, Fort Dodge Regional Airport, Mason City Municipal Airport, Sioux Gateway Airport, Southeast Iowa Regional Airport, and Waterloo Regional Airport.

=== Railroads ===
Amtrak's California Zephyr serves southern Iowa with stops in Burlington, Mount Pleasant, Ottumwa, Osceola, and Creston along its route between Chicago and Emeryville, California. Fort Madison is served by Amtrak's Southwest Chief, running between Chicago and Los Angeles. Both provide daily service through the state.

=== Public Transit ===
Iowa is served by a number of local transit providers including 380 Express, Bettendorf Transit, Cambus, Cedar Rapids Transit, Clinton Municipal Transit Administration, Coralville Transit, Cyride, Davenport Citibus, Des Moines Area Regional Transit, Iowa City Transit, The Jule, Mason City Transit, MET Transit, Omaha Metro Transit, Ottumwa Transit Authority, Quad Cities MetroLINK and Sioux City Transit.

Intercity bus service in the state is provided by Burlington Trailways, Greyhound Lines, and Jefferson Lines.

Local transit map
Local Transit Systems (Only systems with fixed-route services are shown)

== Law and government ==
=== State ===
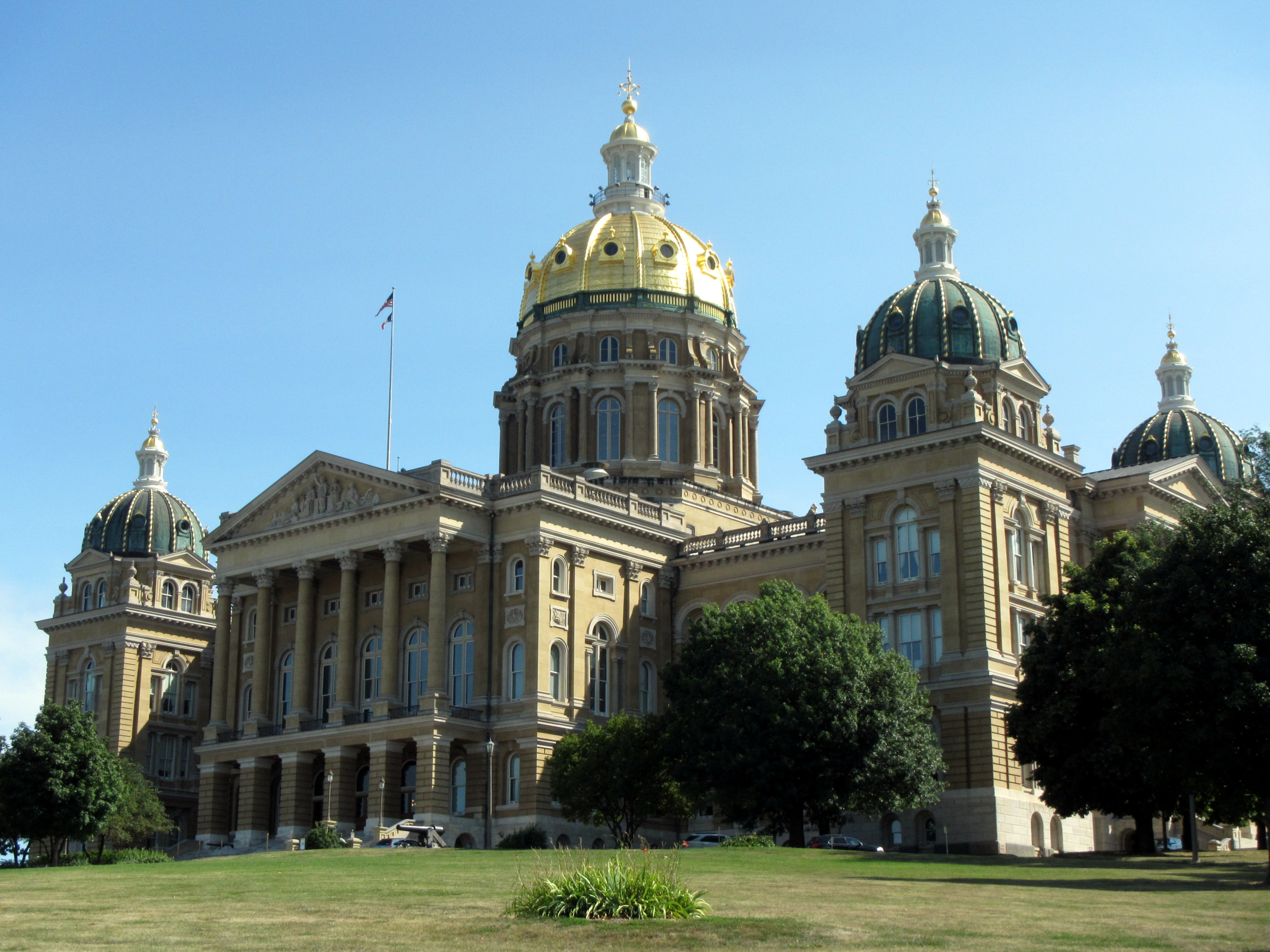
The Iowa State Capitol in Des Moines, completed in 1886, is the only state capitol in the United States to feature five domes. It houses the Iowa General Assembly, comprising the Iowa House of Representatives and Iowa Senate.

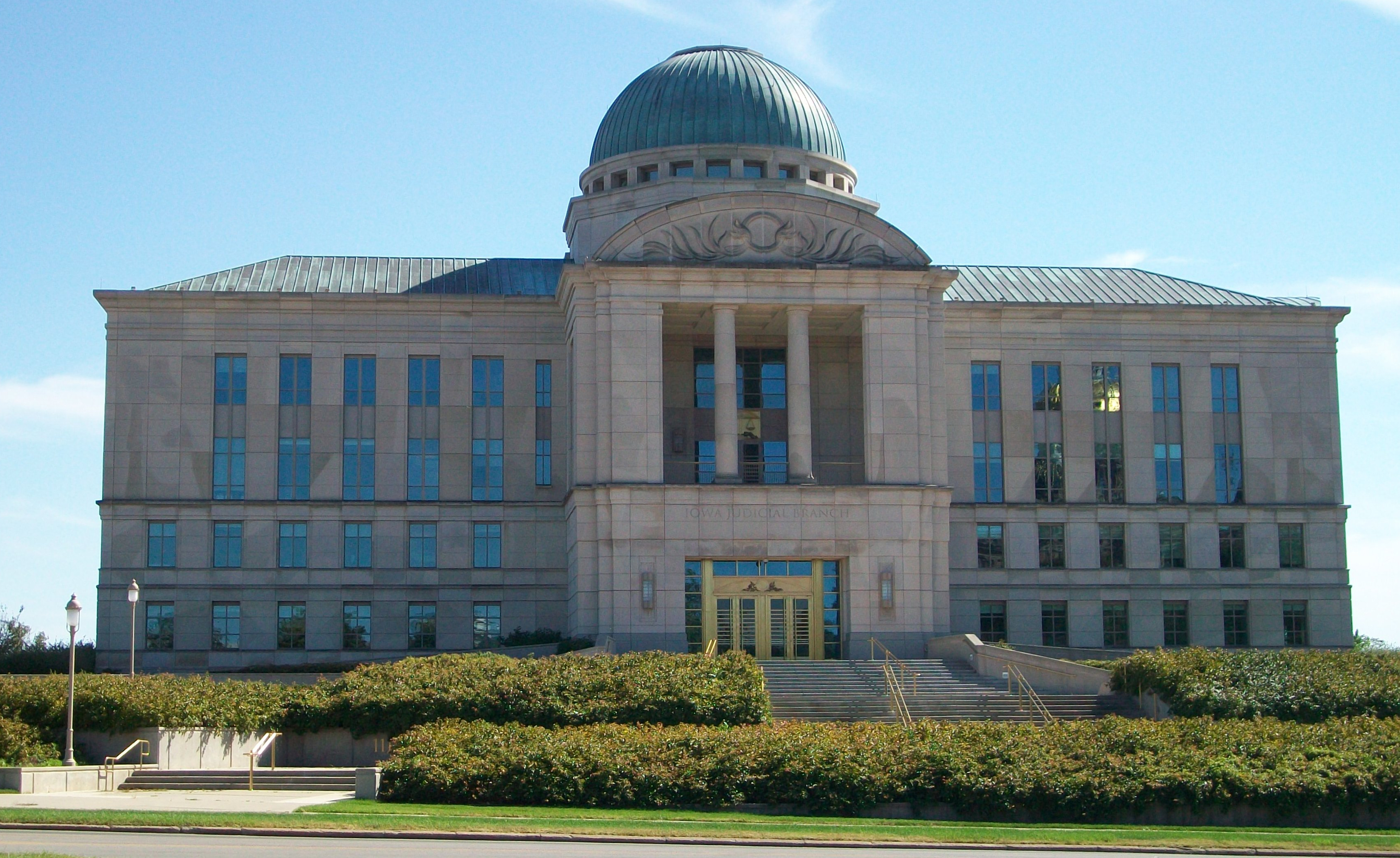
The Iowa Supreme Court, across from the capitol, is the state's highest court.

Logo for the State of Iowa.

As of 2022, the 43rd and current governor of Iowa is Kim Reynolds (R). Other statewide elected officials are:

- Chris Cournoyer (R), Lieutenant Governor
- Paul Pate (R), Secretary of State
- Rob Sand (D), Auditor of State
- Roby Smith (R), Treasurer of State
- Mike Naig (R), Secretary of Agriculture
- Brenna Bird (R), Attorney General

The Code of Iowa contains Iowa's statutory laws. It is periodically updated by the Iowa Legislative Service Bureau, with a new edition published in odd-numbered years and a supplement published in even-numbered years.

Iowa is an alcohol monopoly or alcoholic beverage control state.

=== National ===
The two U.S. senators:

- Chuck Grassley (R), in office since 1981
- Joni Ernst (R), in office since 2015

The four U.S. representatives:

- Mariannette Miller-Meeks (R), First district
- Ashley Hinson (R), Second district
- Zach Nunn (R), Third district
- Randy Feenstra (R), Fourth district

After the 2010 United States census and the resulting redistricting, Iowa lost one seat in Congress, falling to four seats in the U.S. House of Representatives. Incumbent U.S. representatives Leonard Boswell (D) and Tom Latham (R) ran against each other in 2012 in the third congressional district which had new boundaries; Latham won and retired after the 2014 elections. King represented the old fifth congressional district.

=== Political parties ===
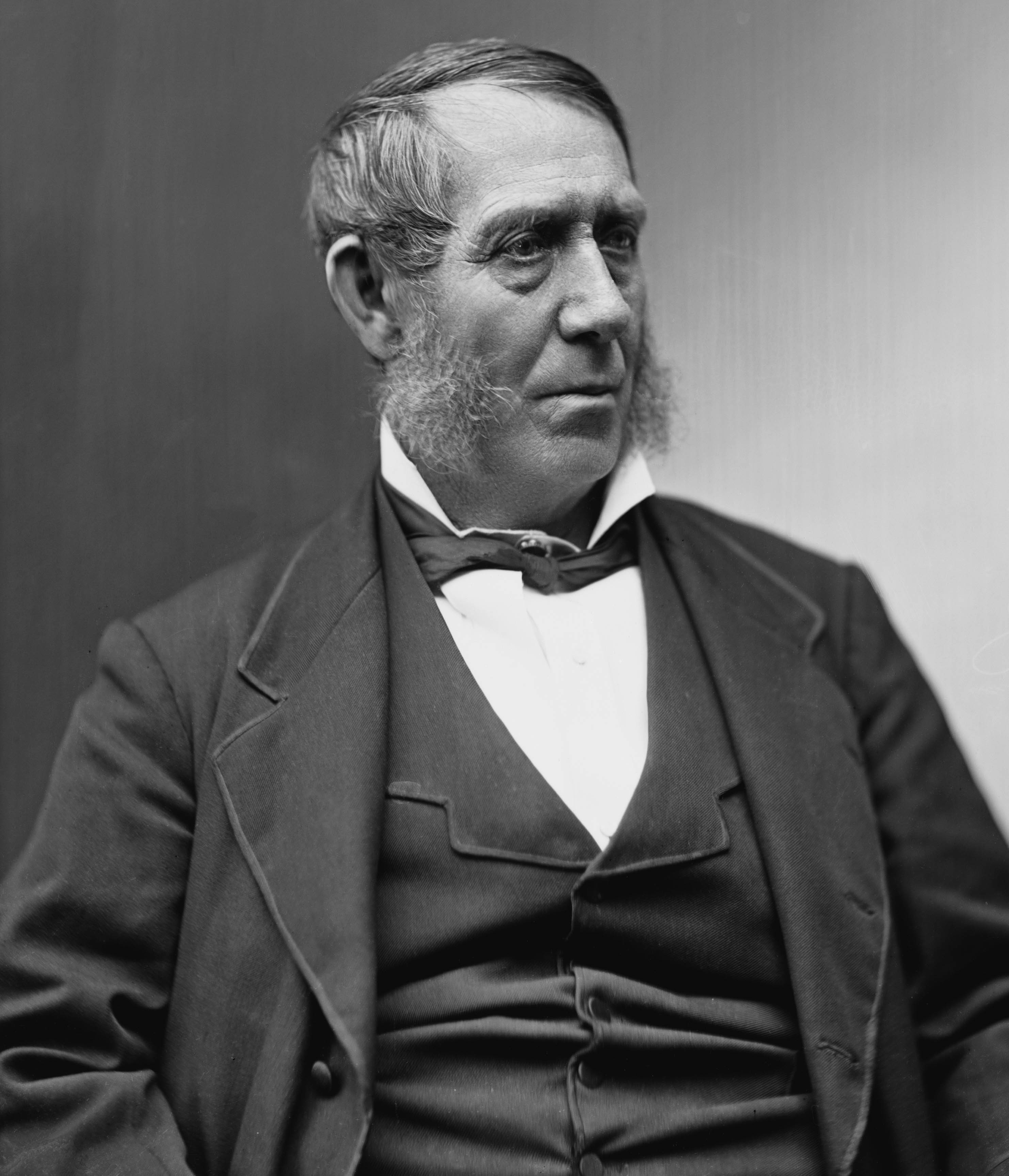
Samuel J. Kirkwood, founder of the Iowa Republican Party, abolitionist, and Iowa's Civil War Governor

In Iowa, the term "political party" refers to political organizations which have received two percent or more of the votes cast for president or governor in the "last preceding general election". Iowa recognizes three political parties—the Republican Party, the Democratic Party, and the Libertarian Party. The Libertarian Party obtained official political party status in 2017 as a result of presidential candidate Gary Johnson receiving 3.8% of the Iowa vote in the 2016 general election. Third parties, officially termed "nonparty political organizations", can appear on the ballot as well. Four of these have had candidates on the ballot in Iowa since 2004 for various positions: the Constitution Party, the Green Party, the Pirate Party, and the Socialist Workers Party.

=== Voter trends ===
As a result of the 2010 elections, each party controlled one house of the Iowa General Assembly: the House had a Republican majority, while the Senate had a Democratic majority. As a result of the 2016 elections, Republicans gained control of the Senate. Incumbent Democratic governor Chet Culver was defeated in 2010 by Republican Terry Branstad, who had served as governor from 1983 to 1999. On December 14, 2015, Branstad became the longest serving governor in U.S. history, serving (at that time) 20 years, 11 months, and 3 days; eclipsing George Clinton, who served 21 years until 1804. Lieutenant Governor Kim Reynolds succeeded him on May 24, 2017, following Branstad's appointment as U.S. Ambassador to China.

In previous eras, Democratic and Republican parties had a balance in state politics and federal representation. By 2024, the two became dominated by the Republican Party. Factors include younger people leaving for more urbanized, more Democratic-leaning states, as well as homogenization of rural voters in the Midwest and in other regions.

Party registration as of October 1, 2025:
Party	Total voters	Percentage
Republican	776,159	36.52%
No affiliation	735,769	34.62%
Democratic	593,816	27.94%
Other	19,607	0.92%
Total	2,125,351	100.00%

=== Presidential caucus ===
The Iowa caucus, gatherings of voters to select delegates to the state conventions, is the first presidential caucus in the country. The caucuses, held in January or February of the election year, involve people gathering in homes or public places and choosing their candidates, rather than casting secret ballots as is done in a presidential primary election. Along with the New Hampshire primary the following week, Iowa's caucuses have become the starting points for choosing the two major-party candidates for president. The national and international media give Iowa and New Hampshire extensive attention, which gives Iowa voters leverage. In 2007 presidential campaign spending was the seventh highest in the country. In a 2020 study, Iowa was ranked as the 24th easiest state for citizens to vote in.

=== Civil rights ===
==== Racial equality ====
The Union Block building in Mount Pleasant, scene of early civil rights and women's rights activities

In the 19th century Iowa was among the earliest states to enact prohibitions against race discrimination, especially in education, but was slow to achieve full integration in the 20th century. In the first decision of the Iowa Supreme Court—In Re the Matter of Ralph, decided July 1839—the Court rejected slavery in a decision that found a slave named Ralph became free when he stepped on Iowa soil, 26 years before the end of the Civil War. The state did away with racial barriers to marriage in 1851, more than 100 years before the U.S. Supreme Court would ban miscegenation statutes nationwide.

The Iowa Supreme Court decided Clark v. The board of directors in 1868, ruling that racially segregated "separate but equal" schools had no place in Iowa, 85 years before Brown v. Board of Education. By 1875, a number of additional court rulings effectively ended segregation in Iowa schools. Social and housing discrimination continued against Blacks at state universities until the 1950s. The Court heard Coger v. The North Western Union Packet Co. in 1873, ruling against racial discrimination in public accommodations 91 years before the U.S. Supreme Court reached the same decision.

In 1884, the Iowa Civil Rights Act apparently outlawed discrimination by businesses, reading: "All persons within this state shall be entitled to the full and equal enjoyment of the accommodations, advantages, facilities, and privileges of inns, restaurants, chophouses, eating houses, lunch counters, and all other places where refreshments are served, public conveyances, barber shops, bathhouses, theaters, and all other places of amusement." However, the courts chose to narrowly apply this act, allowing de facto discrimination to continue. Racial discrimination at public businesses was not deemed illegal until 1949, when the court ruled in State of Iowa v. Katz that businesses had to serve customers regardless of race; the case began when Edna Griffin was denied service at a Des Moines drugstore. Full racial civil rights were codified under the Iowa Civil Rights Act of 1965.

==== Women's rights ====
As with racial equality, Iowa was a vanguard in women's rights in the mid-19th century, but did not allow women the right to vote until the Nineteenth Amendment to the United States Constitution was ratified in 1920, Iowa legislature being one of the ratifying votes. In 1847, the University of Iowa became the first public university in the U.S. to admit men and women on an equal basis. In 1869, Iowa became the first state in the union to admit women to the practice of law, with the Court ruling women may not be denied the right to practice law in Iowa and admitting Arabella A. Mansfield to the practice of law. Several attempts to grant full voting rights to Iowa women were defeated between 1870 and 1919. In 1894 women were given "partial suffrage", which allowed them to vote on issues, but not for candidates. It was not until the ratification of the Nineteenth Amendment that women had full suffrage in Iowa. Although Iowa supported the Federal Equal Rights Amendment, in 1980 and 1992 Iowa voters rejected an Equal Rights Amendment to the state constitution. Iowa added the word "women" to the Iowa Constitution in 1998. After the amendment, it reads: "All men and women are, by nature, free and equal, and have certain inalienable rights—among which are those of enjoying and defending life and liberty, acquiring, possessing and protecting property, and pursuing and obtaining safety and happiness."

In May 2018 Iowa signed into law one of the country's most restrictive abortion bans: the requirement that a doctor cannot perform an abortion if they can detect a fetal heartbeat, which in many cases would restrict abortions pregnancies less than six weeks old. It was struck down in January 2019, when an Iowa state judge ruled that the "fetal heartbeat" law was unconstitutional.

==== LGBTQ rights ====
The state's law criminalizing same-sex sexual activity was repealed in June 1976, 27 years before Lawrence v. Texas. In 2007, the Iowa Legislature added "sexual orientation" and "gender identity" to the protected classes listed in the Iowa Civil Rights Act. The Iowa Legislature later struck "gender identity" from these protections in 2025, making Iowa the first U.S. state to remove a protected group from a state anti-discrimination law.

On April 3, 2009, the Iowa Supreme Court decided Varnum v. Brien, holding in a unanimous decision, the state's law forbidding same-sex marriage was unconstitutional. This made Iowa the third state in the U.S. and first in the Midwest to permit same-sex marriage.

On March 22, 2023, Governor Kim Reynolds signed into law Iowa Senate File 538 (S.F. 538) with immediate effect. The law restricted access to gender-affirming care for legal minors, including hormone replacement therapy and puberty blockers.

== Sister jurisdictions ==
Iowa has ten official partner jurisdictions:

- Yamanashi Prefecture, Japan (1960)
- Yucatán, Mexico (1964)
- Hebei Province, People's Republic of China (1983)
- Terengganu, Malaysia (1987)
- Taiwan, Republic of China (1989)
- Stavropol Krai, USSR/Russia (1989)
- Cherkasy Oblast, Ukraine (1996)
- Veneto Region, Italy (1997)
- Republic of Kosovo (2013) A consulate was opened in Des Moines in 2015.

== See also ==
- Index of Iowa-related articles
- Outline of Iowa
- USS Iowa, 4 ships

== Notes ==
Preceded by Texas	List of U.S. states by date of statehood Admitted on December 28, 1846 (29th)	Succeeded by Wisconsin
