= List of bus transit systems in the United States =

The following is a list of presently-operating bus transit systems in the United States with regular service. The list excludes charter buses, private bus operators, paratransit systems, and trolleybus systems. Figures for daily ridership, number of vehicles, and daily vehicle revenue miles are accurate as of 2009 and come from the FTA National Transit Database.

== Alabama ==
System	Locale	Major city(s)	Daily ridership (2024)	Number of vehicles (2024)	Daily vehicle revenue miles (2024)	References
Areawide Community Transportation System	Calhoun County	Anniston and Oxford	228	4	501	
Gadsden Trolley System	Etowah County	Gadsden	198	4	316	
MAX Transit	Greater Birmingham	Birmingham	5,179	42	4,790	
Montgomery Area Transit System	Montgomery County	Montgomery	1,302	19	3,370	
Orbit	Huntsville	Huntsville	1,796	17	1,993	
Phenix City Express	Lee and Russell counties	Phenix City	66	4	185	
The Tuscaloosa Trolley	Tuscaloosa County	Tuscaloosa	774	7	827	
The Wave Transit System	Mobile County	Mobile	1,527	20	3,024	

== Alaska ==
System	Locale	Major city(s)	Daily ridership	Number of vehicles	Daily vehicle revenue miles	References
Bethel Public Transit System	Bethel Census Area	Bethel				
Capital Transit System	Juneau	Juneau	4,154	18		
Glacier Valley Transit	Anchorage	Girdwood				
Metropolitan Area Commuter System	Fairbanks North Star Borough	Fairbanks	980	8	1,158	
North Slope Borough Transit	North Slope	Utqiaġvik				
People Mover	Anchorage	Anchorage	900	52		
The Bus	Ketchikan Gateway Borough	Ketchikan	584	11		
The Ride	City & Borough of Sitka	Sitka				
Valley Transit	Mat-Su Borough	Wasilla	>130			

== Arizona ==
System	Locale	Major city(s)	Daily ridership	Number of vehicles	Daily vehicle revenue miles	References
Mountain Line	Flagstaff area	Flagstaff	7,700	12	1,867	
Central Arizona Regional Transit	Pinal County	Coolidge, Florence, Casa Grande	134	7	14	[1][2]
Valley Metro (Scottsdale Trolley)	Scottsdale	Scottsdale	92,400 (Note: Combined with City of Phoenix and RPTA)	11	1,132	
Vista Transit	Sierra Vista	Sierra Vista				
Sun Tran	Tucson	Tucson	51,100	170	21,115	
Valley Metro (City of Phoenix)	Maricopa County	Phoenix	92,400 (Note: Combined with Scottsdale Trolley and RPTA)	428	55,534	
Valley Metro (RPTA)	Maricopa County	Tempe, Mesa	92,400 (Note: Combined with Scottsdale Trolley and City of Phoenix)	301	36,608	
Yuma County Area Transit	Yuma County	Yuma	908	8	2,534	

== Arkansas ==
System	Locale	Major city(s)	Daily ridership	Number of vehicles	Daily vehicle revenue miles	References
Eureka Springs Transit	Carroll County	Eureka Springs				
Fort Smith Transit	Sebastian County	Fort Smith	540	6	747	
Hot Springs Intracity Transit	Garland County	Hot Springs				
Jonesboro Economical Transit	Craighead County	Jonesboro				
Memphis Area Transit Authority	Shelby County, Tennessee and West Memphis, Arkansas	Memphis	8,800			
Ozark Regional Transit	Benton County and Washington County	Fayetteville, Springdale, Rogers, and Bentonville	488	11	1,036	
Pine Bluff Transit	Jefferson County	Pine Bluff				
Razorback Transit	University of Arkansas	Fayetteville	3,637	14	770	
Rock Region Metro	Little Rock, North Little Rock, Cammack Village, Maumelle, and Sherwood	Little Rock	8,300	47	6,348	
T-Line	Texarkana metropolitan area	Texarkana, Texas and Texarkana, Arkansas				

== California ==
System	Locale	Major city(s)	Daily ridership	Number of vehicles	Daily vehicle revenue miles	References
AC Transit	Western Alameda and Contra Costa counties	Oakland, Fremont, and Berkeley	164,800	532	60,418	
Anaheim Resort Transit	Greater Anaheim Resort and Orange County	Anaheim	107,900	42	1,826	
Antelope Valley Transit Authority	Antelope Valley	Palmdale and Lancaster	10,100	57	7,046	
B-Line	Butte County	Chico	3,521	25	2,886	
Beach Cities Transit	Coastal Los Angeles County	Redondo Beach	800	10	1,028	
Bear Transit	Berkeley and University of California, Berkeley	Berkeley				
Big Blue Bus	Santa Monica and neighboring cities	Santa Monica	33,900	155	14,565	
Turlock Transit	Turlock	Turlock	300	5	487	
Caltrain shuttle buses	San Francisco Peninsula and Santa Clara Valley		4,286	37	2,824	
Chula Vista Transit	Chula Vista	Chula Vista	9,867	33	3,402	
City of Commerce Transit	Commerce	Commerce	1,846	6	665	
City of Lompoc Transit	Lompoc	Lompoc	751	10	1,084	
Corona Cruiser	Corona	Corona	453	5	594	
County Connection	Central Contra Costa County	Concord	9,900	86	8,520	
Culver CityBus	Culver City	Culver City	11,000	35	3,975	
El Dorado Transit	Pollock Pines, Camino, Placerville, El Dorado, Diamond Springs, El Dorado Hills, Sacramento, Shingle Springs, Folsom, Cameron Park	El Dorado, California	24,134	13	27,194 [3][9]	
Fairfield and Suisun Transit	Fairfield and Suisun City area	Fairfield and Suisun City	800	37	4,603	
Foothill Transit	San Gabriel Valley		34,200	256	31,461	
Fresno Area Express	Fresno	Fresno	39,600	95	12,850	
Fresno County Rural Transit Agency	Fresno County	Fresno	728	119	2,150	
GTrans	Gardena	Gardena	8,300	41	4,481	
Gold Coast Transit	Cities of Ventura, Oxnard, Port Hueneme, Ojai, and parts of unincorporated Ventura County	Ventura and Oxnard	11,700	39	4,748	
Golden Empire Transit	Bakersfield metropolitan area	Bakersfield	17,600	69	9,793	
Golden Gate Transit	San Francisco Bay Area (San Francisco, Marin, Sonoma, and Contra Costa counties)		6,000	172	14,930	
GrapeLine	Lodi	Lodi	663	8	720	
Imperial Valley Transit	Imperial County	El Centro, Calexico, and Brawley	1,524	14	1,781	
Kings Area Regional Transit	Kings County	Hanford and Lemoore	2,496	16	2,073	
Laguna Beach Transit	Laguna Beach	Laguna Beach	1,489	17	462	
Long Beach Transit	Long Beach	Long Beach	62,200	184	19,264	
Los Angeles County Metropolitan Transportation Authority (Metro Bus)	Los Angeles County	Los Angeles	742,800	2,410	257,398	
Los Angeles Department of Transportation	Los Angeles	Los Angeles	83,406	258	21,639	
Marguerite	Stanford University (and connections to Palo Alto)	Stanford	6,300			
Marin Transit	Marin County	San Rafael, Marin City, Novato and San Anselmo	10,200	66		
Merced County Transit (The Bus)	Merced County	Merced	3,258	26	4,018	
Montebello Bus Lines	Montebello	Montebello	20,800	61	7,318	
Monterey-Salinas Transit	Monterey County	Monterey and Salinas	10,400	72	9,755	
Muni	San Francisco	San Francisco	400,400	820	34,171	
North County Transit District (Breeze)	North San Diego County		18,300	121	15,742	
Norwalk Transit	Norwalk area	Norwalk	5,200	28	3,758	
Omnitrans	San Bernardino valley	San Bernardino	26,600	139	22,679	
Orange County Transportation Authority	Orange County		109,000	543	64,645	
Petaluma Transit	Petaluma	Petaluma	420	6	527	
Placer County Transit	Placer County	Auburn	2,483	22	3,417	
Porterville Transit	Porterville	Porterville	1,522	13	1,003	
Redding Area Bus Authority	Shasta County	Redding	1,500	12	1,892	
Riverside Transit Agency	Western Riverside County	Riverside, Moreno Valley, and Corona	22,100	133	21,299	
Roseville Transit	Roseville area	Roseville	1,103	16	1,748	
Sacramento Regional Transit District (RT)	Sacramento region	Sacramento	33,600	195	19,847	
SamTrans	San Mateo County		28,300	264	20,022	
San Diego Metropolitan Transit System (MTS)	San Diego County	San Diego	130,500	420	49,403	
San Joaquin Regional Transit District (RTD)	San Joaquin County	Stockton	9,900	92	9,504	
San Luis Obispo Regional Transit Authority	San Luis Obispo County	San Luis Obispo	1,514	16	2,537	
Santa Barbara Metropolitan Transit District (MTD)	Santa Barbara, Carpinteria, Goleta, Montecito, Summerland, and Isla Vista	Santa Barbara	15,400	92	7,763	
Santa Clara Valley Transportation Authority (VTA)	Santa Clara County	San Jose	77,100	347	43,794	
Santa Clarita Transit	Santa Clarita	Santa Clarita, California	8,300	68	8,250	
Santa Cruz Metro	Santa Cruz County	Santa Cruz and Watsonville	20,000	82	9,066	
Santa Maria Area Transit	Santa Maria	Santa Maria	3,189	15	2,157	
Santa Rosa CityBus	Santa Rosa	Santa Rosa	7,831	35	2,990	
Simi Valley Transit	Simi Valley	Simi Valley	800	8	1,304	
SLO Transit	San Luis Obispo	San Luis Obispo	2,828	12	1,038	
SolTrans	Solano County	Vallejo, Benicia	3,800	37	5,282	
Sonoma County Transit	Sonoma County	Santa Rosa	3,844	41	4,727	
Stanislaus Regional Transit Authority	Stanislaus County	Modesto				
SunLine	Coachella Valley		8,500	43	6,463	
Thousand Oaks Transit	Thousand Oaks	Thousand Oaks	509	6	534	
Torrance Transit	South Bay region of Los Angeles County		9,200	56	5,617	
Tri Delta Transit	Eastern Contra Costa County		6,000	57	6,639	
Tulare County Regional Transit Agency	Tulare County	Tulare, Dinuba		25+		
Union City Transit	Union City	Union City	1,270	12	1,251	
Unitrans	Davis and the University of California, Davis	Davis	18,800	35	1,969	
Ventura Intercity Service Transit Authority	Ventura County		1,500	25	3,848	
Victor Valley Transit Authority	Victor Valley	Victorville, Hesperia, and Apple Valley	3,401	26	4,569	
VINE	Napa County	Napa	3,300	25	2,841	
Visalia Transit	Visalia	Visalia	2,200	28	3,789	
WestCAT	Western Contra Costa County	Pinole and Hercules	3,772	35	4,256	
WHEELS	Tri-Valley	Dublin, Livermore and Pleasanton	10,100	47	5,527	
Yolobus	Yolo County and parts of Sacramento	Davis, West Sacramento, and Woodland	3,200	41	6,029	
Yuba-Sutter Transit	Sutter County	Yuba City	2,699	23	2,385	

== Colorado ==
System	Locale	Major city(s)	Daily ridership	Number of vehicles	Daily vehicle revenue miles	References
Avon Transit	Avon	Avon	334	3	423	
Bustang	Statewide	Statewide	766	80	5,454	
City of Loveland Transit	Loveland	Loveland	399	5	428	
Durango Transit	La Plata County	Durango	1,165	18	175	
Grand Valley Transit	Grand Junction, Palisade, Clifton, Orchard Mesa, and Fruita	Grand Junction	2,354	11	2,027	
Greeley-Evans Transit	Greeley and Evans	Greeley	2,210	33	1,065	
Mountain Metropolitan Transit	Colorado Springs	Colorado Springs	12,100	143	8,681	
Pueblo Transit	Pueblo	Pueblo	2,479	12	1,532	
Regional Transportation District	Denver metropolitan area	Denver	177,700	955	104,782	
Roaring Fork Transportation Authority	Roaring Fork Valley	Aspen, Carbondale, and Glenwood Springs	11,800			
Summit Stage	Summit County, Fairplay, Leadville	Breckenridge, Frisco, Copper, Dillon, Silverthorne, Keystone, Blue River, Alma, Fairplay, Leadville	8,000	20	10,000	
Transfort	Fort Collins area	Fort Collins	9,100	23	2,169	

== Connecticut ==
System	Locale	Major city(s)	Daily ridership	Number of vehicles	Daily vehicle revenue miles	References
9 Town Transit	Old Saybrook					
Connecticut Transit (Hartford Division)	Hartford area	Hartford	37,201	193	17,937	
Connecticut Transit (New Haven Division)	New Haven metropolitan area	New Haven	23,557	92	9,478	
Connecticut Transit (Stamford Division)	Stamford metropolitan area	Stamford	9,155	43	4,213	
Greater Bridgeport Transit Authority	Bridgeport metropolitan area	Bridgeport	16,819			
Housatonic Area Regional Transit	Danbury area	Danbury	3,378			
Middletown Area Transit	Middletown area	Middletown	1,725			
Milford Transit District	Milford	Milford	1,379			
Northeast Transportation Company	Waterbury, Meriden, and Wallingford	Waterbury	6,782			
Norwalk Transit District	Norwalk metropolitan area	Norwalk	5,000			
Southeast Area Transit	New London and Norwich		3,789			
Windham Region Transit District	Windham County					
Magic Carpet Bus	Enfield Area	Enfield				
Northeastern Connecticut Transit District	Northeastern Connecticut (Brooklyn, Canterbury, Killingly, Putnam, Thompson, Eastford, Plainfield, Pomfret, Woodstock, and Union)					
Valley Transit District	Ansonia, Derby, Seymour, and Shelton					

== Delaware ==
System	Locale	Major city(s)	Daily ridership	Number of vehicles	Daily vehicle revenue miles	References
DART First State	Delaware (statewide)	Dover, Newark, Wilmington	32,400	183	17,023	
Unicity Bus System	Newark and University of Delaware	Newark				

== District of Columbia ==
System	Locale	Major city(s)	Daily ridership	Number of vehicles	Daily vehicle revenue miles	References
Metrobus	Washington Metropolitan Area	Washington	384,200	1,310	375,052	

== Florida ==
System	Locale	Major city(s)	Daily ridership	Number of vehicles	Daily vehicle revenue miles	Notes / references
Bay Town Trolley	Bay County	Panama City, Panama City Beach, and Lynn Haven				
Broward County Transit	Broward County	Fort Lauderdale	74,000			
Citrus Connection	Polk County with an extension into Osceola County	Lakeland				
Collier Area Transit	Collier County	Naples	3,850			
Disney Transport	Walt Disney World			350 (2016)		free bus service, operated privately by Disney but open to all visitors
Escambia County Area Transit	Escambia County	Pensacola				
Hillsborough Area Regional Transit	Hillsborough County	Tampa	39,000			
I-Ride Trolley	International Drive	Orlando				operated by International Drive Master Transit and Improvement District
Jacksonville Transportation Authority	Duval County	Jacksonville	23,400			
LakeXpress	Lake County	Tavares				
LeeTran	Lee County	Fort Myers	5,100			
Lynx	Orange, Osceola, and Seminole Counties, with extensions into Lake and Polk Counties	Orlando	63,200			
Manatee County Area Transit	Manatee	Bradenton	4,700			
Metrobus	Miami-Dade County	Miami	171,600			
Palm Tran	Palm Beach County	West Palm Beach	27,700			
Pasco County Public Transportation	Pasco County	Port Richey				
Pinellas Suncoast Transit Authority	Pinellas County	St. Petersburg and Clearwater	31,200			
Ride Solution	Putnam County	Palatka				
Regional Transit System	Alachua County	Gainesville	45,700			
Sarasota County Area Transit	Sarasota County	Sarasota				
Space Coast Area Transit	Brevard County	Palm Bay, Melbourne, and Titusville				
StarMetro	Tallahassee	Tallahassee				
Sumter County Transit	Sumter County	The Villages				
SunTran	Marion County	Ocala				
THE Bus	Hernando County	Brooksville				
VOTRAN	Volusia County	Daytona Beach	9,200			
The Wave	Okaloosa County	Fort Walton Beach				
Winter Haven Area Transit	Polk County	Winter Haven				

== Georgia ==
System	Locale	Major city(s)	Daily ridership	Number of vehicles	Daily vehicle revenue miles	References
Albany Transit System	Dougherty County	Albany		18		
Athens Transit	Clarke County	Athens	6,900			
Augusta Public Transit	Richmond County	Augusta	3,000			
Chatham Area Transit	Chatham County	Savannah				
CobbLinc	Cobb County	Marietta	10,400			
Connect Douglas	Douglas County	Douglasville				
GRTA Xpress	Atlanta-Sandy Springs-Roswell, GA Metropolitan Statistical Area	Atlanta	4,400			
Ride Gwinnett	Gwinnett County	Lawrenceville	5,000			
Macon Transit Authority (MTA)	Bibb County	Macon				
MARTA Bus	City of Atlanta, Fulton County, DeKalb County and Clayton County	Atlanta	102,700			
METRA Transit System	Muscogee County	Columbus				
UGA Campus Transit	University of Georgia		39,700			
Warner Robins Transit	Houston County	Warner Robins				

== Hawaii ==
System	Locale	Major city(s)	Daily ridership	Number of vehicles	Daily vehicle revenue miles	References
Hele-On Bus	Hawaii County	Hilo				
Maui Bus	Maui County	Kahului and Wailuku				
The Kauaʻi Bus	Kauaʻi County					
TheBus	Honolulu County	Honolulu	127,900			
Rainbow Shuttle	University of Hawaii at Manoa					

== Idaho ==
System	Locale	Major city(s)	Daily ridership	Number of vehicles	Daily vehicle revenue miles	References
Citylink	Kootenai County	Coeur d'Alene				
Lewiston Transit	Nez Perce County	Lewiston				
Mountain Rides	Blaine County	Ketchum				
Pocatello Regional Transit	Bannock County	Pocatello				
Selkirks–Pend Oreille Transit Authority (SPOT)	Bonner County	Sandpoint				
Silver Express	Shoshone County	Kellogg				
Sustainable Moscow Area Regional Transportation (SMART)	Moscow, Idaho	Moscow				
ValleyRide	Ada and Canyon counties	Boise				

== Illinois ==
System	Locale	Major city(s)	Daily ridership	Number of vehicles	Daily vehicle revenue miles	References
Beloit Transit	Rock County, Wisconsin and Winnebago County, Illinois	Beloit, Wisconsin and South Beloit, Illinois				
Boone County Transit	Boone County	Belvidere				
Central Illinois Public Transit	Southeast Central Illinois	Effingham				
Champaign County Area Rural Transit System	Champaign County	Rantoul				
Champaign-Urbana Mass Transit District	Champaign and Urbana	Champaign and Urbana	34,700	128		
Chicago Transit Authority	Chicago	Chicago	654,600			
CityLink	Peoria, Peoria Heights, and West Peoria	Peoria	6,300			
Connect Transit	McLean County	Bloomington and Normal	6,700			
CRIS Rural Mass Transit District	Vermillion County and Ford County	Hoopeston				
Danville Mass Transit	Vermilion County	Danville				
Decatur Public Transit System	Decatur	Decatur				
DeKalb Public Transit	DeKalb County	DeKalb				
Dial-A-Ride	Coles County and Douglas County	Mattoon and Charleston				
Fulton County Rural Transit	Fulton County	Canton				
Galesburg Transit	Knox County	Galesburg				
Go West Transit	McDonough County	Macomb				
Henry County Public Transportation	Henry County and Stark County	Kewanee				
JAX Mass Transit	Jackson County	Carbondale	302	26	1,022	
Jo Daviess County Transit	Jo Daviess County	Galena				
Kendall Area Transit	Kendall County	Oswego and Yorkville				
Madison County Transit	Madison County	Edwardsville, Alton and Granite City	7,100			
MetroBus	Greater St. Louis	St. Louis, Missouri and Belleville, Illinois	41,400			
MetroLINK	Rock Island County	Moline and Rock Island	10,400			
Monroe Randolph Transit District	Monroe County and Randolph County	Sparta				
North Central Area Transit	LaSalle County	Ottawa and Streator				
Pace	Northeastern Illinois	Chicago	81,800			
Piattran	Piatt County	Monticello				
Quincy Transit Lines	Quincy	Quincy				
Reagan Mass Transit District	Lee County, Ogle County, and Winnebago County	Rochelle and Dixon				
Rides Mass Transit District	Southern Illinois	Carbondale, Harrisburg, and Marion				
River Valley Metro Mass Transit District	Kankakee County and parts of Will County	Kankakee and Bourbonnais				
Rockford Mass Transit District	Rockford metro area	Rockford	5,200			
St. Clair County Transit District	St. Clair County	Belleville				
Sangamon Mass Transit District	Springfield	Springfield	5,100			
Shawnee Mass Transit District	Southern Illinois	Anna, Cairo, Metropolis				
SHOW Bus	East Central Illinois	Lincoln and Pontiac				
South Central Illinois Mass Transit District	South Central Illinois	Centralia and Mount Vernon				
Stateline Mass Transit District	Winnebago County	Roscoe and South Beloit				
Warren County Public Transportation	Warren County and Mercer County	Monmouth				
West Central Mass Transit District	West Central Illinois	Jacksonville				
Whiteside County Public Transportation	Whiteside County	Sterling				

== Indiana ==
System	Locale	Major city(s)	Daily ridership	Number of vehicles	Daily vehicle revenue miles	References
Access Johnson County	Johnson County	Franklin and Greenwood				
Bloomington Transit	Bloomington	Bloomington		52		
Cass Area Transit	Cass County	Logansport				
Central Indiana Regional Transportation Authority	Boone and Hendricks counties	Plainfield and Whitestown				
ChicaGo Dash	Valparaiso to Chicago	Valparaiso, Chicago	121			
City of Anderson Transit System (CATS)	Anderson	Anderson		17		
ColumBUS	Bartholomew County	Columbus				
CityBus	Lafayette and West Lafayette	Lafayette	8,800	80		
East Chicago Transit		East Chicago				
Fort Wayne Citilink	Fort Wayne	Fort Wayne	5,000			
Gary Public Transportation Corporation (GPTC)	Gary and nearby cities	Gary		26		
Hammond Transit	Defunct					
IndyGo	Marion County	Indianapolis	22,900	168		
Interurban Trolley		Elkhart, Goshen		23		
Kokomo City-Line		Kokomo	2,000	34		
Marion Transit System (MTS)	Marion	Marion		13		
Metropolitan Evansville Transit System (METS)		Evansville		50		
Michigan City Transit		Michigan City		12		
Muncie Indiana Transit System (MITS)		Muncie	3,100	49		
Roseview Transit (RTS)	Richmond	Richmond		18		
South Bend Transpo		South Bend, Mishiwaka	5,100	69		
Southern Indiana Transit System	Harrison and Washington counties	Corydon and Salem				
Terre Haute Transit	Terre Haute	Terre Haute		16		
Transit Authority of River City	Clark and Floyd counties	Louisville, KY				
V-Line	Valparaiso	Valparaiso		11		
Warrick Area Transit System	Warrick County	Boonville and Newburgh				
Washington Transit System	Daviess County	Washington				

== Iowa ==
System	Locale	Major city(s)	Daily ridership	Number of vehicles	Daily vehicle revenue miles	References
380 Express	Linn County and Johnson County	Iowa City and Cedar Rapids	193	4	30	
Bettendorf Transit	Scott County	Bettendorf	166	5	657	
Burlington Urban Service	Des Moines County	Burlington	269	13	487	
Cambus	Iowa City and the University of Iowa	Iowa City	8,250	35	1,876	
Cedar Rapids Transit	Linn County	Cedar Rapids	2,691	32	2,922	
Clinton Municipal Transit Administration	Clinton County	Clinton	460	22	954	
Coralville Transit	Johnson County	Coralville	525	11	520	
CyRide	Ames and Iowa State University	Ames	13,479	92	3,474	
Davenport Citibus	Scott County	Davenport	1,087	15	1,760	
Des Moines Area Regional Transit (DART)	Polk County	Des Moines	8,828	150	13,425	
Dodger Area Rapid Transit (DART)	Webster County	Fort Dodge	100	11	402	
Iowa City Transit	Johnson County	Iowa City	1,440	27	1,888	
Marshalltown Municipal Transit	Marshall County	Marshalltown	164	6	346	
Mason City Transit	Cerro Gordo County	Mason City	261	12	617	
MetroLINK	Rock Island County, Illinois and Scott County, Iowa	Moline, Rock Island, Davenport	4,448	53	6,487	
Metro Transit (Omaha)	Omaha metropolitan area	Omaha, Council Bluffs	7,217	135	11,096	
Metropolitan Transit Authority of Black Hawk County	Black Hawk County	Waterloo	521	27	2,254	
MuscaBus	Muscatine County	Muscatine	231	9	614	
Oskaloosa Rides	Mahaska County	Oskaloosa	30			
Ottumwa Transit Authority	Wapello County	Ottumwa	542	5	542	
River Bend Transit	Scott County	Davenport	262	31	1,455	
Sioux City Transit	Sioux City, Iowa	Sioux City, Iowa	1,688	22	1,981	
The Jule	Dubuque County	Dubuque	876	28	1,468	

== Kansas ==
System	Locale	Major city(s)	Daily ridership	Number of vehicles	Daily vehicle revenue miles	References
ATA Bus	Riley County	Manhattan				
CityGo	Saline County	Salina				
D-TRAN	Ford County	Dodge City				
Finney County Transit	Finney County	Garden City				
Johnson County Transit	Kansas City Metro Area	Overland Park	1,700			
Kansas City Area Transportation Authority	Kansas City Metro Area	Kansas City	38,700			
Lawrence Transit	Douglas County	Lawrence				
Liberal City Bus	Seward County	Liberal				
Lyon County Area Transportation	Lyon County	Emporia				
Pittsburg Area Community Transit/Gus Bus	Crawford County	Pittsburg				
Reno County Area Transit	Reno County	Hutchinson				
Topeka Metro	Topeka	Topeka	4,200			
Wichita Transit	Wichita	Wichita	3,600			

== Kentucky ==
System	Locale	Major city(s)	Daily ridership	Number of vehicles	Daily vehicle revenue miles	References
Ashland Bus System	Ashland, Catlettsburg, Summit, Kenova (WV)	Ashland				
Berea Bus Service	Madison County	Berea				
Bluegrass Ride	Boyle and Scott counties	Danville and Georgetown				
Clarksville Transit System	Oak Grove and Clarksville (TN)	Clarksville, Tennessee				
Frankfort Transit	Frankfort, Franklin County	Frankfort				
Glasgow Transit	Barren County	Glasgow				
GO bg Transit	Bowling Green	Bowling Green	400			
Henderson Area Rapid Transit	Henderson County	Henderson				
LexTran	Fayette County	Lexington	10,200			
Maysville City Transit	Mason County	Maysville				
Mor'Trans	Rowan County	Morehead				
Oldham's Public Bus	Oldham County	La Grange				
Owensboro Transit System	Owensboro	Owensboro				
Paducah Transit Authority	Paducah	Paducah				
Richmond Transit Service	Barren County	Richmond				
Topper Transit	Western Kentucky University	Bowling Green				
Transit Authority of Central Kentucky	Elizabethtown	Elizebethtown				
Transit Authority of Northern Kentucky	Northern Kentucky	Covington	6,000<			
Transit Authority of River City	Louisville metropolitan area	Louisville	19,800			
Winchester-Clark County Transit Service	Clark County	Winchester				

== Louisiana ==
System	Locale	Major city(s)	Daily ridership	Number of vehicles	Daily vehicle revenue miles	References
Alexandria Transportation Authority	Rapides Parish	Alexandria				
Capital Area Transit System	Baton Rouge metropolitan area	Baton Rouge	2,400			
Good Earth Transit	Terrebonne Parish	Houma				
Jefferson Transit	Jefferson Parish	Metairie				
Lafayette Transit System	Lafayette Parish	Lafayette				
Lake Charles Transit	Calcasieu Parish	Lake Charles				
Monroe Transit	Ouachita Parish	Monroe				
New Orleans Regional Transit Authority	New Orleans	New Orleans	30,700			
SporTran	Caddo Parish	Shreveport				
St. Bernard Urban Rapid Transit	St. Bernard Parish	Chalmette				

== Maine ==
System	Locale	Major city(s)	Daily ridership	Number of vehicles	Daily vehicle revenue miles	References
BAT Community Connector	Bangor metropolitan area	Bangor	2,800			
METRO	Portland, Westbrook, and Falmouth	Portland				
Aroostook Regional Transportation System (ARTS)	Aroostook County					Explore Maine by Bus - Fixed-Route Bus Service, www.aroostooktransportation.org
Downeast Transportation	Hancock County	Bar Harbor, Ellsworth, Bangor				http://www.downeasttrans.org/
Island Explorer						www.exploreacadia.com
Washington Hancock Community Agency (WHCA)	Hancock and Washington Counties, including Isle au Haut and, excluding Danforth					www.whcacap.org
West's Transportation		Calais, Bangor (commuter)				www.westbusservice.com

== Maryland ==
System	Locale	Major city(s)	Daily ridership	Number of vehicles	Daily vehicle revenue miles	References
Allegany County Transit	Allegany County	Cumberland				
Annapolis Transit	Anne Arundel County	Annapolis				
Cecil Transit	Cecil County	Elkton				
Harford Transit	Harford County	Bel Air				
Metrobus	Washington Metropolitan Area	Washington, D.C.	384,200			
MTA Maryland	Baltimore-Washington Metropolitan Area	Baltimore	173,600			
Ocean City Transportation	Worcester County	Ocean City				
RTA Central Maryland	Anne Arundel, Howard, and Prince George's counties	Columbia, Laurel				
Ride On	Montgomery County		64,000			
Shore Transit	Somerset, Wicomico and Worcester counties	Salisbury				
TheBus	Prince George's County		15,100			
TransIT	Frederick County	Frederick				
Washington County Transit	Washington County	Hagerstown				

== Massachusetts ==
System	Locale	Major city(s)	Daily ridership	Number of vehicles	Daily vehicle revenue miles	References
Brockton Area Transit Authority	Brockton area	Brockton				
Berkshire Regional Transit Authority	The Berkshires	Pittsfield				
Cape Ann Transportation Authority	Cape Ann	Gloucester				
Cape Cod Regional Transit Authority	Barnstable County	Barnstable				
Franklin Regional Transit Authority	Franklin County	Greenfield				
Greater Attleboro Taunton Regional Transit Authority	Attleboro, Taunton, and nearby cities	Attleboro, Taunton, and Plymouth				
Lowell Regional Transit Authority	Greater Lowell	Lowell				
Martha's Vineyard Transit Authority	Martha's Vineyard	Vineyard Haven				
Massachusetts Bay Transportation Authority	Boston and immediate suburbs	Boston	335,300			
Merrimack Valley Regional Transit Authority	Greater Merrimack River Valley	Lawrence and Haverhill				
MetroWest Regional Transit Authority	MetroWest Region	Framingham				
Montachusett Regional Transit Authority	North Central Massachusetts	Fitchburg, Leominster, and Gardner				
Nantucket Regional Transit Authority	Nantucket	Nantucket				
Pioneer Valley Transit Authority	Hampden, Hampshire, and Franklin counties	Springfield, Northampton				
Southeastern Regional Transit Authority	Fall River and New Bedford	Fall River and New Bedford				
Worcester Regional Transit Authority	Worcester and immediate suburbs	Worcester				

== Michigan ==
System	Locale	Major city(s)	Daily ridership	Number of vehicles	Daily vehicle revenue miles	References
University of Michigan Transit Services	University of Michigan Ann Arbor campuses	Ann Arbor	27,349	61		National Transit Database
Battle Creek Transit	Calhoun County	Battle Creek	900			
Bay Area Transportation Authority	Traverse City metropolitan area, Grand Traverse County, Michigan and Leelanau County, Michigan	Traverse City				
Bay Metropolitan Transportation Authority	Bay City metropolitan area, Bay County, Michigan	Bay City				
Blue Water Area Transit	St. Clair County	Port Huron	4,800			
Capital Area Transportation Authority	Urban Ingham County & Delta Township	Lansing	24,200	276		
Detroit Department of Transportation	Detroit	Detroit	49,400	449		
Harbor Transit	Ottawa County	Grand Haven				
Jackson Area Transportation Authority	Jackson County	Jackson				
Lake Erie Transit	Monroe County	Monroe				
Macatawa Area Express	Ottawa and Allegan counties	Holland				
MarqTran	Marquette County	Marquette				
Metro Transit	Kalamazoo metropolitan area	Kalamazoo	6,000	91		
MTA	Genesee County	Flint	13,300	284		
Muskegon Area Transit System	Muskegon County	Muskegon	800			
Saginaw Transit Authority Regional Services	Saginaw County	Saginaw				
SMART	Wayne, Oakland and Macomb counties	Detroit	44,000	247		
The Rapid	Grand Rapids metropolitan area	Grand Rapids	20,000	129		
The Ride	Ann Arbor-Ypsilanti area	Ann Arbor	21,803	134		
Twin Cities Area Transportation Authority	Berrien County	Benton Harbor and Saint Joseph				

== Minnesota ==
System	Locale	Major city(s)	Daily ridership	Number of vehicles	Daily vehicle revenue miles	References
Arrowhead Transit	Aitkin County, Carlton County, Chisago County, Cook County, Isanti County, Itasca County, Koochiching County, Lake County, Pine County, and St. Louis County	Duluth, Hibbing, Virginia, Grand Rapids, Cambridge, North Branch, Cloquet, Two Harbors, International Falls, and Ely	1,200	258	6288.1	
Central Community Transit	Meeker County, Kandiyohi County and Renville County	Willmar, Litchfield				
Cities Area Transit	East Grand Forks and Grand Forks, North Dakota	East Grand Forks and Grand Forks, North Dakota				
Community Transit	Southwestern Minnesota	Marshall, Redwood Falls				
Duluth Transit Authority	Duluth	Duluth, Minnesota and Superior, Wisconsin				
Hermann Express	Brown County	New Ulm				
Hiawathaland Transit	Wabasha County, Goodhue County and Rice County	Faribault, Northfield and Red Wing				
Hibbing Area Transit	Iron Range	Hibbing				
La Crosse Municipal Transit Utility	La Crosse County, Wisconsin and Houston County, Minnesota	La Crosse, Wisconsin and La Crescent, Minnesota	3,214	39		
Mankato Transit System	Blue Earth County	Mankato		20		
Maple Grove Transit	Minneapolis – Saint Paul	Maple Grove				
Metro Area Transit	Fargo, North Dakota–Moorhead, Minnesota metropolitan area	Fargo				
Metro Transit	Minneapolis – Saint Paul	Minneapolis and Saint Paul	125,200			
Minnesota Valley Transit Authority	Minneapolis – Saint Paul	Burnsville	4,800			
Plymouth Metrolink	Minneapolis – Saint Paul	Plymouth				
Prairie Lakes Transit	Faribault County and Martin County	Blue Earth and Fairmont				
Prairieland Transit	Nobles County	Worthington				
Rainbow Rider Transit	Douglas County, Grant County, Pope County, Stevens County and Todd County	Morris and Alexandria				
Rochester Public Transit	Rochester	Rochester				
Richfield Bus Company (commuter)	southeastern Minnesota	Rochester				
Southern Minnesota Area Rural Transit	Freeborn County, Mower County, Steele County and Waseca County	Albert Lea, Austin, Owatonna and Waseca				
Southwest Transit	Minneapolis – Saint Paul	Eden Prairie	1,400			
St. Cloud Metropolitan Transit Commission	St. Cloud metro area	St. Cloud	2,500			
Tri-Valley Heartland Express	Northwest Minnesota	Crookston				
University of Minnesota Campus Shuttle	Minneapolis – Saint Paul	Minneapolis				
Winona Transit Service	Winona County	Winona				

== Mississippi ==
System	Locale	Major city(s)	Daily ridership	Number of vehicles	Daily vehicle revenue miles	References
Coast Transit Authority	Harrison County and Ocean Springs	Biloxi and Gulfport				
Hub City Transit	Hattiesburg	Hattiesburg				
Jatran	Jackson area	Jackson				
Oxford-University Transit	Oxford area and University of Mississippi	Oxford				
S.M.A.R.T.	Starkville area and Mississippi State University	Starkville				
Tupelo Transit	Lee County, Mississippi	Tupelo, Mississippi				
N-Route	Vicksburg area	Vicksburg				

== Missouri ==
System	Locale	Major city(s)	Daily ridership	Number of vehicles	Daily vehicle revenue miles	References
MetroBus	Greater St. Louis	St. Louis, St. Charles East St. Louis, Chesterfield	64,600			
Kansas City Area Transportation Authority	Kansas City Metro Area	Kansas City, Blue Springs, Johnson County	30,200			
City Utilities of Springfield	Springfield Metropolitan Area	Springfield	4,200			
JeffTran	Jeff City	Jefferson City				
Go COMO	Columbia Metropolitan Area	Columbia	850			
Tiger Line	Mizzou	Columbia	N/A			
Inde*Bus	Independence	Independence				
Saint Joseph Transit	St. Joseph	St. Joseph				
Cape Girardeau Transit Authority	Cape Girardeau, Missouri	Cape Girardeau County, Missouri				
West Plains Transit System	West Plains, Missouri	West Plains, Missouri				
Bluff Area Transit Service	Poplar Bluff, Missouri	Poplar Bluff, Missouri				
Kirk-Tran	Kirksville, Missouri	Kirksville, Missouri				
Excelsior Springs Transportation	Excelsior Springs, Missouri	Excelsior Springs, Missouri				
Chillicothe Transit System	Chillicothe, Missouri	Chillicothe, Missouri				
City of Houston Bus	Houston, Missouri	Houston, Missouri				
OATS		Warrensburg, Missouri, and Sedalia, Missouri, Southwest Missouri to Springfield, Missouri, Camdenton, Missouri to Columbia, Missouri & Jefferson City, Missouri, Northeast Missouri to Columbia, Missouri & St. Louis, Northwest Missouri to St. Joseph, Missouri & Kansas City, Missouri				
Metro Area Public Transit System (MAPS Transit)	Joplin metropolitan area	Joplin				

== Montana ==
System	Locale	Major city(s)	Daily ridership	Number of vehicles	Daily vehicle revenue miles	References
ASUM Transportation	University of Montana	Missoula	4,000	9	330	
Capital Transit	Lewis and Clark County	Helena				
MET Transit	Billings	Billings	1,850	20	1,520	
Great Falls Transit	Great Falls and Black Eagle	Great Falls	1,012	13	1,142	
Mountain Line	Missoula and the University of Montana	Missoula	5,600	17	1,741	
Streamline	Gallatin County	Bozeman				
The Bus	Silver Bow County	Butte				

== Nebraska ==
System	Locale	Major city(s)	Daily ridership	Number of vehicles	Daily vehicle revenue miles	References
Metro Transit	Omaha	Omaha				
Sioux City Transit	Sioux City, Iowa and South Sioux City, Nebraska	Sioux City				
StarTran	Lincoln	Lincoln				
Tri-City Roadrunner	Scottsbluff	Scottsbluff				

== Nevada ==
System	Locale	Major city(s)	Daily ridership	Number of vehicles	Daily vehicle revenue miles	References
RTC (Southern Nevada)	Las Vegas Valley	Las Vegas	172,800	274	46,868	
RTC (Washoe County)	Washoe County	Reno	19,800	57	8,782	
Tahoe Truckee Area Regional Transit	Lake Tahoe	Carson City				

== New Hampshire ==
System	Locale	Major city(s)	Daily ridership	Number of vehicles	Daily vehicle revenue miles	References
Concord Area Transit	Concord	Concord				
COAST	Seacoast Region	Portsmouth, Dover, Rochester				
Manchester Transit Authority	Manchester	Manchester	1,905			
Nashua Transit System	Nashua	Nashua				
Advance Transit	Lebanon	Lebanon, Hanover and White River Junction	3,551			

== New Jersey ==
System	Locale	Major city(s)	Daily ridership	Number of vehicles	Daily vehicle revenue miles	References
BurLink	Burlington County					
Colonial Coach of Morristown	Morris County	Morristown				
Kearny Commuter Shuttle	Hudson County	Kearny and Harrison				
The Link/Flemington Shuffle Service	Hunterdon County	Flemington and Raritan Township				
Middlesex County Area Transit (MCAT)	Middlesex County					
New Jersey Transit	New Jersey (statewide) with service to Manhattan and Philadelphia	Newark, Atlantic City, Jersey City, Trenton	481,558	2,222	224,569	
Parsippany Free Transit System	Morris County	Parsippany, New Jersey				
Princeton Free B	Mercer County	Princeton				
Princeton Junction Shuttle	Mercer County	East Windsor Township and Hightstown				
Route 57 Shuttle	Warren County					
Route 130 Connection Shuttle	Mercer County					
Rutgers University	Rutgers University (3 campuses statewide)	New Brunswick and Piscataway; Newark, Harrison, and Kearny; Camden	70,000	104		
Somerset County Public Transit	Somerset County					
Sussex County Skylands Ride	Sussex County					
Vernon Area Shuttle	Sussex County	Vernon, New Jersey				
West Milford Bus	Passaic County	West Milford				

== New Mexico ==
System	Locale	Major city(s)	Daily ridership	Number of vehicles	Daily vehicle revenue miles	References
ABQ RIDE	Albuquerque	Albuquerque	25,800	181		
Atomic City Transit	Los Alamos	Los Alamos	1,400			
Carlsbad Municipal Transit System	Carlsbad	Carlsbad				
Gallup Express	Gallup	Gallup				
Hobbs Express	Hobbs	Hobbs				
North Central RTD	Española	Española; Taos; Santa Fe; Los Alamos	500			
NMDOT Park and Ride	New Mexico	Las Cruces; Albuquerque; Santa Fe; Los Alamos	1,258			
Roswell Transit	Roswell	Roswell				
Red Apple Transit	Farmington	Farmington; Aztec				
RoadRUNNER Transit	Las Cruces	Las Cruces	500			
Santa Fe Trails	Santa Fe	Santa Fe	2,500			
Socorro Transportation	Socorro	Socorro				
Taos Chile Line	Taos	Taos				

== New York ==
System	Locale	Major city(s)	Daily ridership	Number of vehicles	Daily vehicle revenue miles	References
Bee-Line Bus System	Westchester County	White Plains, Yonkers	109,422	329	21,121	
Broome County Transit	Broome County	Binghamton				
Capital District Transportation Authority	Capital District	Albany	59,700			
Chautauqua Area Rural Transit System (CARTS)	Chautauqua County	Jamestown, Dunkirk, Fredonia				
Centro	Onondaga, Oswego, Cayuga, and Oneida counties	Syracuse, Utica	33,000			
City of Poughkeepsie Transit	Poughkeepsie	Poughkeepsie	1,522			
Clarkstown Mini-Trans	Clarkstown	Clarkstown	518			
Dutchess LOOP	Dutchess County	Poughkeepsie	3,500			
Huntington Area Rapid Transit	Huntington	Huntington	644			
Long Beach Bus	Long Beach	Long Beach	1,469			
MTA Bus Company	New York City	New York City	452,400	5,725		
Nassau Inter-County Express	Nassau County	Long Beach, Glen Cove	84,969			
New York City Transit	New York City	New York City	2,315,500	5,725		
NFTA Metro	Erie and Niagara counties	Buffalo, Niagara Falls	49,600			
Kingston Citibus	Kingston	Kingston				
Putnam Transit	Putnam County	Brewster	621			
Red Bus	Roosevelt Island	Roosevelt Island		7		
Regional Transit Service	Monroe, Genesee, Livingston, Orleans, Wayne, Wyoming and Seneca counties	Rochester	31500			
St. Lawrence County Commuter	St. Lawrence County	Canton				
Suffolk County Transit	Suffolk County					
Tompkins Consolidated Area Transit	Tompkins County	Ithaca	8,000			
Transport of Rockland	Rockland County	Spring Valley				
Ulster County Area Transit	Ulster County	Kingston	1,224			

== North Carolina ==
System	Locale	Major city(s)	Daily ridership	Number of vehicles	Daily vehicle revenue miles	References
ACTA	Ashe County	Jefferson				
AppalCART	Watauga County	Boone				
Asheville Transit System	Buncombe County	Asheville	4,445	16	2,526	
Bull City Connector	Durham County	Durham				
GoRaleigh	Wake County, North Carolina	Raleigh	25,300			
GoCary	Wake County	Cary	740	10	1,208	
Chapel Hill Transit	Chapel Hill and Carrboro	Chapel Hill	12,900	79	5,343	
Charlotte Area Transit System (CATS)	Mecklenburg County	Charlotte	30,100	286	32,851	
Chatham Transit Network	Chatham County	Siler City				
Cleveland County Transit	Cleveland County					
Craven Area Rural Transit System (CARTS)	Craven County	New Bern, North Carolina				
Duke Buses	Durham County	Durham, North Carolina				
GoDurham	Durham	Durham	19,200			
Fayetteville Area System of Transit (FAST)	Cumberland County	Fayetteville and Spring Lake	5,000			
Gastonia Transit	Gaston County	Gastonia				
GATEWAY	Wayne County	Goldsboro				
GTA	Guilford County	Greensboro	7,200			
Greenville Area Transit (GREAT)	Pitt County	Greenville				
Greenway Public Transportation	Alexander, Burke, Caldwell and Catawba counties					
Hi tran	Guilford County	High Point				
Iredell County Area Transportation System (ICATS)	Iredell County	Statesville				
Jackson County Transit	Jackson County					
Jacksonville Transit	Onslow County	Jacksonville				
Kerr Area Rural Transit System (KARTS)	Vance County	Henderson				
Mountain Mobility	Buncombe County					
PART	Piedmont Triad counties	Greensboro, Winston-Salem, and High Point	1,400			
Rider	Cabarrus County	Concord and Kannapolis				
Rowan Express	Rowan County	Salisbury				
Rutherford County Transit	Rutherford County	Spindale				
Salisbury Transit System	Rowan County	Salisbury				
Spring Lake Transit	Cumberland County	Spring Lake				
Tar River Transit System	Edgecomb and Nash counties	Rocky Mount				
GoTriangle	Wake, Durham and Orange counties	Durham and Raleigh	6,400			
Wave Transit	New Hanover County	Wilmington				
Wilkes Transportation Authority (WTA)	Wilkes					
WSTA	Forsyth County	Winston-Salem				
Wolfline	Wake County and North Carolina State University	Raleigh				

== North Dakota ==
System	Locale	Major city(s)	Daily ridership	Number of vehicles	Daily vehicle revenue miles	References
Bis-Man Transit	Bismarck	Bismarck	361	7	858	
Cities Area Transit	Grand Forks, North Dakota and East Grand Forks, Minnesota	Grand Forks	744	8	1,046	
Metro Area Transit	Fargo, North Dakota–Moorhead, Minnesota metropolitan area	Fargo	4,054	18	1,714	
Minot City Transit (City Bus)	Minot	Minot				

== Ohio ==
System	Locale	Major city(s)	Daily ridership	Number of vehicles	Daily vehicle revenue miles	References
Allen County Regional Transportation Authority	Allen County	Lima	6,000			
Ashtabula County Transportation System	Ashtabula County	Ashtabula				
Athens Public Transit	Athens County	Athens				
Brunswick Transit Alternative (defunct)	Brunswick	Brunswick				
Butler County Regional Transit Authority	Butler County	Middletown and Oxford				
Campus Area Bus Service	Ohio State University campus	Columbus				
Central Ohio Transit Authority	Franklin County and portions of Delaware, Fairfield and Licking Counties	Columbus	41,100	440 (2019)	47,046 (2018)	
Chillicothe Transit System	Ross County	Chillicothe				
Clermont Transportation Connection	Clermont County	Batavia				
Community Action Bus Lines	Washington County	Marietta				
Community Action Rural Transit System	Columbiana County	East Liverpool				
Community Action Transit System	Pike County	Waverly				
Eastern Ohio Regional Transit Authority	Belmont County and Jefferson County	Wheeling, WV				
Fayette County Transportation	Fayette County	Washington Court House				
Geauga County Transit	Geauga County					
Greater Cleveland Regional Transit Authority	Cuyahoga County	Cleveland	65,400			
Greater Dayton Regional Transit Authority	Dayton metropolitan area	Dayton	23,200			
Greene CATS Public Transit	Greene County	Xenia				
Laketran	Lake County		3,000			
Lancaster-Fairfield Public Transit	Fairfield County	Lancaster				
Lawrence County Transit	Lawrence County	Ironton				
Licking County Transit	Licking County	Newark				
Lorain County Transit	Lorain County	Lorain-Elyria				
Medina County Transit	Medina County	Medina				
METRO Regional Transit Authority	Summit County	Akron	19,000			
Pickaway Area Rural Transit	Pickaway County	Circleville				
Portage Area Regional Transportation Authority	Portage County	Kent	3,000			
Richland County Transit	Richland County	Mansfield				
Sandusky Transit System	Erie County	Sandusky				
South East Area Transit	Muskingum County	Zanesville				
Southwest Ohio Regional Transit Authority (Metro)	Cincinnati and suburbs	Cincinnati	46,500			
Springfield City Area Transit	Clark County	Springfield				
Stark Area Regional Transit Authority	Stark County	Canton	5,900			
Steel Valley Regional Transit Authority	Jefferson County	Steubenville				
Toledo Area Regional Transit Authority	Greater Toledo	Toledo	6,500			
Tri-State Transit Authority	Huntington, WV urbanized area	Ironton				
Western Reserve Transit Authority	Mahoning County	Youngstown	7,200			

== Oklahoma ==
System	Locale	Major city(s)	Daily ridership	Number of vehicles	Daily vehicle revenue miles	References
Campus Area Rapid Transit	University of Oklahoma campus	Norman				
Citylink Edmond	Oklahoma City metropolitan area	Edmond				
Embark	Oklahoma City metropolitan area	Oklahoma City and Norman	10,000	54	7,634	
KI BOIS Area Transit System	Southeastern Oklahoma					
Lawton Area Transit System	Lawton	Lawton	1,100	10	1,592	
Metropolitan Tulsa Transit Authority	Tulsa	Tulsa	7,367	57	7,620	
Muskogee County Transit	Northeastern Oklahoma	Muskogee				
Pelivan Transit	Northeastern Oklahoma	Pryor				
The Bus	Payne County	Stillwater				

== Oregon ==
System	Locale	Major city(s)	Daily ridership	Number of vehicles	Daily vehicle revenue miles	References
Albany Transit System		Albany				
Cascades East Transit	Deschutes County	Bend				
Cherriots	Marion County	Salem	20,800			
Corvallis Transit System		Corvallis				
Rogue Valley Transportation District	Jackson County	Medford	5,280			
TriMet	Portland metropolitan area	Portland	140,200			
Lane Transit District	Lane County	Eugene	22,000			
Linn Shuttle	Sweet Home and Linn County	Sweet Home				
Yamhill County Transit	Yamhill County, Oregon	McMinneville, Sheridan, and Newberg				

== Pennsylvania ==
System	Locale	Major city(s)	Daily ridership	Number of vehicles	Daily vehicle revenue miles	References
AMTRAN	Blair County	Altoona	1,700			
ATA	Cameron, Clearfield, Elk, Jefferson, McKean and Potter counties		8,900			
BARTA	Berks County	Reading	14,300			
BCTA	Beaver County with some services to Allegheny County	Beaver	7,900			
BeST Transit	Bradford, Sullivan and Tioga Counties					
The Bus	Butler County	Butler				
CamTran	Cambria County and parts of Somerset County	Johnstown	2,500			
Capital Area Transit (CAT)	Southern Dauphin County and eastern Cumberland County	Harrisburg	8,000			
Carbon Transit	Carbon County					
CATA	Crawford County	Meadville and Titusville				
CATABUS	Centre County	State College	20,600			
Coatesville Link	Chester County	Coatesville and Parkesburg				
Community Coaster	Montgomery County with some service on the Bucks County line	Lansdale, Harleysville, Souderton and Telford				
Conshohocken Rambler	Montgomery County	Conshohocken and Plymouth Meeting				
COLTS	Lackawanna County	Scranton	2,800			
DuFast	Clearfield County	DuBois				
The "e"	Erie County	Erie	8,478	68	12,234	
Fayette Area Coordinated Transportation (FACT)	Fayette County with some services to Allegheny and Westmoreland counties	Uniontown				
Freedom Transit	Adams County	Gettysburg				
Hazleton Public Transit (HPT)	Luzerne County	Hazleton				
IndiGO	Indiana County with some service to Jefferson County	Indiana				
Krapf Route "A"	Chester County	Coatesville, Downingtown, Exton, and West Chester				
LANta	Lehigh and Northampton counties	Allentown, Bethlehem, and Easton	14,000			
Lower Anthracite Transportation System	Northumberland County	Mount Carmel, Shamokin, Sunbury, Pennsylvania				
LCTA	Luzerne County	Wilkes-Barre				
LT	Lebanon, Dauphin and Lancaster counties	Lebanon	800			
MMVTA	Fayette, Washington, Westmoreland and Allegheny counties					
New Castle Area Transit	Lawrence County	New Castle				
Monroe County Transit Authority (Pocono Pony)	Monroe County	Stroudsburg and East Stroudsburg	1,600			
Port Authority of Allegheny County	Allegheny County	Pittsburgh	180,000			
Pottstown Area Rapid Transit	Montgomery and Chester counties	Pottstown				
rabbitTransit	York, Dauphin and Lancaster counties. Also Baltimore County, Maryland	York	6,000			
Raider Regional Transit (RRT)	Cumberland and Franklin counties; Shippensburg University	Shippensburg				
RRTA	Lancaster County	Lancaster	13,400			
River Valley Transit	Lycoming County	Williamsport metropolitan area				
Rushbus	Bucks County	Bristol, Richboro, and Warminster				
SCCOOT	Chester County	Oxford, Kennett Square and West Chester				
SEPTA	Philadelphia, Delaware, Montgomery, Bucks, Chester counties with some service to Mercer County, New Jersey and New Castle County, Delaware	Philadelphia	392,800	1,192	112,000	
STS	Schuylkill County	Pottsville				
Shenango Valley Shuttle Service (SVSS)	Mercer County	Sharon				
Town & Country Transit (TACT)	Armstrong County	Kittanning and Ford City				
Upper Merion Rambler	Montgomery County	Upper Merion Township				
Upper Perk Coaster	Montgomery County	East Greenville, Pennsburg and Red Hill				
VenanGo Bus	Venango County	Franklin and Oil City				
Washington County Transportation Authority (Freedom Transit)	Washington County with some service to Allegheny County	Washington				
Westmoreland Transit	Westmoreland County with some services to Allegheny and Cambria counties	Greensburg				

== Rhode Island ==
System	Locale	Major city(s)	Daily ridership	Number of vehicles	Daily vehicle revenue miles	References
Rhode Island Public Transit Authority	Rhode Island (statewide)	Providence, Pawtucket, and Newport	38,800			

== South Carolina ==
System	Locale	Major city(s)	Daily ridership	Number of vehicles	Daily vehicle revenue miles	References
Best Friend Express	Augusta, Georgia	North Augusta				
Charleston Area Regional Transportation Authority	Charleston metropolitan area	Charleston	9,400			
Coast RTA	Myrtle Beach metropolitan area	Myrtle Beach, Conway				
The Comet	Columbia metropolitan area	Columbia	8,400			
Cross County Connection	Orangeburg County	Orangeburg				
MyRide Rock Hill	Rock Hill	Rock Hill				
Palmetto Breeze Transit	Beaufort County	Beaufort, Hilton Head Island				
Pee Dee Regional Transportation Authority (PDRTA)	Florence	Florence				
Spartanburg Area Regional Transit Agency (SPARTA)	Spartanburg	Spartanburg				
Greenlink Transit	Greenville	Greenville				
Clemson Area Transit	Clemson University	Clemson				
TriCounty Link	Southern South Carolina	Summerville				

== South Dakota ==
System	Locale	Major city(s)	Daily ridership	Number of vehicles	Daily vehicle revenue miles	References
Rapid Ride	Rapid City	Rapid City	633	7	659	
Sioux Area Metro	Sioux Falls	Sioux Falls	1,800	30	1,970	
Sioux City Transit	North Sioux City	Sioux City, Iowa				
YST Transit	Yankton Reservation	Wagner		3		

== Tennessee ==
System	Locale	Major city(s)	Daily ridership	Number of vehicles	Daily vehicle revenue miles	References
Bristol Tennessee Transit	Sullivan County	Bristol				
Chattanooga Area Regional Transportation Authority	Hamilton County	Chattanooga	7,600	10		
Clarksville Transit System	Montgomery County	Clarksville				
Cleveland Urban Area Transit System	Bradley County	Cleveland				
Franklin Transit Authority	Williamson County	Franklin				
Jackson Transit Authority	Madison County	Jackson				
Johnson City Transit	Johnson City Metropolitan Area	Johnson City				
Kingsport Area Transit System	Sullivan and Hawkins counties	Kingsport				
Knoxville Area Transit	Knoxville area	Knoxville	8,000			
Lakeway Transit	Lakeway Area	Morristown				
Memphis Area Transit Authority	Shelby County, Tennessee	Memphis	8,800	197	14,000	
Murfreesboro Rover	Rutherford County	Murfreesboro				
Pigeon Forge Mass Transit	Pigeon Forge	Pigeon Forge				
WeGo Public Transit	Davidson County	Nashville	33,600			

== Texas ==
System	Locale	Major city(s)	Daily ridership	Number of vehicles	Daily vehicle revenue miles	References
Alamo Regional Transit	Alamo Area (except Bexar County)	Pleasanton and Seguin	1,100	4	560	
Amarillo City Transit	Amarillo	Amarillo	590	19	1,500	
Beaumont ZIP	Beaumont	Beaumont	880	17	2,100	
Bobcat Shuttle	Texas State University	San Marcos	8,600	47	2,900	
Brazos Transit District	Brazos Valley and Deep East Texas	Bryan, College Station, Livingston, Lufkin, and Nacogdoches	1,700	27	3,800	
Brownsville Metro	Brownsville	Brownsville	3,100	23	2,200	
CapMetro Bus	Austin metropolitan area	Austin, Leander, and Round Rock	69,800	463	41,000	
CARTS	Capital Area	Austin, Bastrop, Luling, Taylor, and San Marcos	170	40	2,100	
Citibus	Lubbock	Lubbock	6,500	75	4,500	
City of Del Rio Transportation	Val Verde County	Del Rio	35	5	170	
CityLink Abilene	Abilene	Abilene	880	18	1,100	
Colorado Valley Transit	Austin, Colorado, Waller, and Wharton Counties	Bellville, Columbus, Hempstead, and Wharton	140	4	1,000	
Concho Valley Transit	San Angelo	San Angelo	650	18	1,300	
Conroe Connection	Conroe	Conroe	280	10	730	
Corpus Christi Regional Transportation Authority	Nueces County	Corpus Christi	13,700	88	8,000	
Dallas Area Rapid Transit	Dallas metropolitan area	Dallas, Irving, and Plano	82,600	662	67,900	
DCTA Connect	Denton County	Denton and Lewisville	4,000	36	2,200	
El Aguila	Webb County (except Laredo)	El Cenizo, Rio Bravo	120	17	540	
El Metro Transit	Laredo	Laredo	4,800	44	4,400	
El Paso Transportation Authority	El Paso County (except the city of El Paso)	Anthony, Canutillo, Homestead Meadows, Horizon City, San Elizario, Socorro, and Tornillo	460	17	3,000	
EZ-Rider	Midland–Odessa metropolitan area	Midland and Odessa	650	36	2,200	
Falls Ride	Wichita Falls	Wichita Falls	740	22	1,600	
Fort Bend Transit	Fort Bend County	Richmond and Sugar Land	1,200	27	1,900	
Gulf Coast Transit District	Brazoria and Galveston Counties (except the city of Galveston)	Angleton, Clute, Freeport, Lake Jackson, League City and Texas City	990	24	3,200	
Harris County Transit	Eastern Harris County	Baytown and La Porte	450	19	2,500	
The HOP	Killeen–Temple metropolitan area	Belton, Killeen, and Temple	1,000	56	1,800	
Island Metro	South Padre Island	Laguna Heights, Port Isabel, and South Padre Island	1,300	10	950	
Island Transit	Galveston	Galveston	640	18	750	
JagExpress	South Texas College	McAllen, Rio Grande City, and Weslaco	40	9	200	
Longview Transit	Longview	Longview	510	11	1,200	
Metro McAllen	McAllen	McAllen	1,900	26	1,400	
METROBus	Houston metropolitan area	Houston	206,900	1,217	117,000	
Paris Metro	Paris	Paris	210	8	410	
Port Arthur Transit	Port Arthur	Port Arthur	390	17	1,200	
San Marcos Transit	San Marcos	San Marcos	340	22	1,200	
STAR Transit	Kaufman, Rockwall, and southern Dallas Counties	Balch Springs	120	6	600	
Sun Metro	El Paso	El Paso	18,100	151	15,700	
SWART	Middle Rio Grande (except Val Verde County)	Eagle Pass	120	3	130	
T-Line	Texarkana metropolitan area	Texarkana, Texas and Texarkana, Arkansas	740	13	1,000	
Trinity Metro	Fort Worth metropolitan area	Fort Worth	15,600	160	15,100	
UTRGV Transportation	University of Texas Rio Grande Valley	Brownsville, Edinburg, Harlingen, and Welasco	1,700	51	4,200	
Valley Metro	Rio Grande Valley	Brownsville, Edinburg, Harlingen, and McAllen	790	50	5,000	
VIA Metropolitan Transit	San Antonio metropolitan area	San Antonio	105,800	516	49,200	
Victoria Transit	Jackson, Matagorda, and Victoria Counties	Victoria	1,400	26	2,800	
Waco Transit System	McLennan County	Waco	2,200	25	2,600	
The Woodlands Express	The Woodlands	The Woodlands	1,300	40	1,600	

== Utah ==
System	Locale	Major city(s)	Daily ridership	Number of vehicles	Daily vehicle revenue miles	References
Basin Transit Association	Uintah Basin	Vernal, Duchesne, and Roosevelt				
Connect Transit	Cache Valley	Logan	6,892	34	2,256	
Cedar Area Transportation	Cedar City	Cedar City				
High Valley Transit	Summit County	Park City				
Moab Area Transit	Grand County	Moab				
Park City Transit	Park City area	Park City	790	27 (Not including microtransit vehicles)		
The Ryde	Brigham Young University area	Provo				
SunTran	St. George area	St. George				
Utah Transit Authority	Wasatch Front	Salt Lake City, Ogden, Provo, West Valley City	75,600	371	45,966	

== Vermont ==
System	Locale	Major city(s)	Daily ridership	Number of vehicles	Daily vehicle revenue miles	References
Tri-Valley Transit	Addison County	Middlebury				
Chittenden County Transportation Authority	Burlington, Essex, South Burlington, Shelburne, Williston, Winooski, Milton, and Colchester	Burlington	6,889	45	3,697	
Green Mountain Community Network	Bennington County	Bennington	7,300			
Green Mountain Transit Authority	Washington, Lamoille, Franklin, and Grand Isle counties, and the towns of Orange, Williamstown, and Washington	Barre (city), Barre (town) and Montpelier	7,300			
Marble Valley Regional Transit District	Rutland County	Rutland				
Rural Community Transportation	Caledonia, Essex, Lamoille, and Orleans counties	St. Johnsbury				
Southeast Vermont Transit	Windham and Windsor counties	Springfield, Brattleboro				

== Virginia ==
System	Locale	Major city(s)	Daily ridership	Number of vehicles	Daily vehicle revenue miles	References
Arlington Transit	Arlington County	Arlington	9,200			
Blacksburg Transit			12,200			
Brite Bus	Augusta County	Staunton, Waynesboro				
CUE Bus	Fairfax, George Mason University	Fairfax	2,700			
Charlottesville Area Transit	Albemarle County	Charlottesville	6,641			
DASH	Alexandria	Alexandria				
Fairfax Connector	Fairfax County	Fairfax	32,900			
Fredericksburg Regional Transit	Fredericksburg, VA, Caroline County Spotsylvania County, Stafford County	Fredericksburg				
Greater Lynchburg Transit Company	Lynchburg	Lynchburg				
Greater Richmond Transit Company	Richmond	Richmond	35,700			
Hampton Roads Transit	Cities of Chesapeake, Hampton, Newport News, Norfolk, Portsmouth, Suffolk, and Virginia Beach		27,300			
Harrisonburg Transit	Harrisonburg	Harrisonburg				
LC Transit	Leesburg	Leesburg				
Metrobus	Washington Metropolitan Area	Washington, D.C.	384,200			
Petersburg Area Transit	Petersburg	Petersburg				
PRTC OmniRide	Woodbridge	Manassas, Manassas Park	10,200			
Valley Metro (Roanoke)	Roanoke	Roanoke, Salem, Vinton				
Williamsburg Area Transit Authority	Historic Triangle; Williamsburg, James City County York County, Surry County	Williamsburg	5,100			

== Washington ==
System	Locale	Major city(s)	Daily ridership	Number of vehicles	Daily vehicle revenue miles	References
Ben Franklin Transit	Pasco/Tri-Cities	Pasco	24,200			
Clallam Transit	Clallam County	Port Angeles				
C-TRAN	Clark County	Vancouver	18,300			
Community Transit	Snohomish County (with the exception of Everett)	Lynnwood	34,100			
Everett Transit	Everett	Everett				
Grant Transit Authority	Grant County	Moses Lake				
Grays Harbor Transit	Grays Harbor County	Aberdeen				
Intercity Transit	Thurston County	Olympia	18,900			
Island Transit	Island County	Oak Harbor				
Jefferson Transit	Jefferson County	Port Townsend				
King County Metro	King County	Seattle	246,500	1540		
Kitsap Transit	Kitsap County	Bremerton	6,600			
Rural Transit	Thurston County	Olympia				
Twin Transit	Lewis County	Centralia				
Link Transit	Chelan County	Wenatchee	3,700			
Mason Transit Authority	Mason County	Shelton				
Pacific Transit System	Pacific County	Raymond				
Pierce Transit	Pierce County	Tacoma	29,700			
Pullman Transit	Whitman County	Pullman				
River Cities Transit	Cowlitz County	Longview				
Skagit Transit	Skagit County	Mount Vernon	1,308			
Spokane Transit Authority	Spokane County	Spokane	38,100			
Sound Transit Express	Puget Sound region	Seattle	25,600			
Valley Transit	Walla Walla County	Walla Walla				
Whatcom Transportation Authority	Whatcom County	Bellingham	10,162		6,170	
Yakima Transit	Yakima County	Yakima				

== West Virginia ==
System	Locale	Major city(s)	Daily ridership	Number of vehicles	Daily vehicle revenue miles	References
Bluefield Area Transit	Mercer County	Bluefield				
Buckwheat Express	Preston County	Kingwood				
Central West Virginia Transportation Authority	Harrison County	Clarksburg				
Country Roads Transit	Randolph and Upshur counties	Elkins				
Eastern Panhandle Transit Authority	Berkeley and Jefferson counties	Martinsburg				
Fairmont Marion County Transit Authority	Marion County	Fairmont				
Four County Transit	Mercer County	Bluefield				
Graham Transit	Mercer County	Bluefield				
Here and There Transit	Barbour County	Philippi				
KRT	Kanawha County	Charleston				
Mid-Ohio Valley Transit Authority	Wood County	Parkersburg				
Mountain Line Transit Authority	Monongalia County	Morgantown				
Mountain Transit Authority	Fayette, Greenbrier, Nicholas, and Webster counties	Summersville				
New River Transit Authority	Fayette and Raleigh counties	Beckley				
OVRTA/EORTA	Ohio County, Marshall County, and Belmont County, Ohio	Wheeling	1,162	14	1,993	
Potomac Valley Transit Authority	Grant, Hardy, Hampshire, Mineral and Pendleton counties	Moorefield and Petersburg				
Steel Valley Regional Transit Authority	Hancock County	Weirton				
Tri River Transit	Boone, Lincoln, Logan and Wayne counties	West Hamlin				
TTA	Cabell County	Huntington				
Weirton Transit Corporation	Hancock County	Weirton				

== Wisconsin ==
System	Locale	Major city(s)	Daily ridership	Number of vehicles	Daily vehicle revenue miles	References
Bay Area Rural Transit	Ashland County	Ashland				
Beloit Transit	Rock County	Beloit				
Central Transit	Portage County	Stevens Point				
Door County Connector Link	Door County	Sturgeon Bay				
Duluth Transit Authority	Douglas County and St. Louis County, Minnesota	Superior and Duluth, Minnesota				
Dunn County Transit	Dunn County	Menomonie				
Eau Claire Transit	Eau Claire County	Eau Claire, Altoona	3,369	66		
Fond du Lac Area Transit	Fond du Lac County	Fond du Lac				
GO Transit	southern Winnebago County	Oshkosh	2,610	48		
Green Bay Metro	Brown County	Green Bay	3,100	50		
Janesville Transit System	Rock County	Janesville				
Kenosha Transit	Kenosha County	Kenosha	5,349	80		
La Crosse Municipal Transit Utility	La Crosse County and Houston County, Minnesota	La Crosse and La Crescent, Minnesota	3,214	39		
Lac du Flambeau Transit	Vilas County	Lac du Flambeau				
Langlade County Public Transit	Langlade County	Antigo				
Madison Metro	Dane County	Madison and Sun Prairie	38,000	269		
Maritime Metro Transit	Manitowoc County	Manitowoc and Two Rivers				
Menominee Regional Public Transit	Menominee County	Keshena and Shawano				
Merrill-Go-Round	Lincoln County	Merrill				
Milwaukee County Transit System	Milwaukee County	Milwaukee and West Allis	66,700	505		
Metro Ride	Marathon County	Wausau				
Namekagon Transit	Sawyer County	Hayward				
Northwoods Transit	Oneida County and Vilas County	Rhinelander				
Platteville Public Transportation	Grant County	Platteville				
Ryde Racine	Racine County	Racine	3,615	47		
Scenic Mississippi Regional Transit	La Crosse County, Vernon County, Crawford County and Monroe County	La Crosse, Viroqua, Prairie du Chien and Tomah				
Shoreline Metro	Sheboygan County	Sheboygan				
Valley Transit	Outagamie County, Calumet County, northern Winnebago County	Appleton and Neenah	3,864	128		
Waukesha Metro	Waukesha County	Waukesha				

== Wyoming ==
System	Locale	Major city(s)	Daily ridership	Number of vehicles	Daily vehicle revenue miles	References
Casper Area Transit	Casper	Casper	326	6	579	
Cheyenne Transit	Cheyenne	Cheyenne	700	11	1,004	
Goose Creek Transit	Sheridan County	Sheridan				
START Bus	Teton County	Jackson				
University of Wyoming Transit System	University of Wyoming	Laramie				
Wind River Transportation Authority	Fremont County and the Wind River Indian Reservation	Riverton and Lander				

== See also ==
- List of United States local bus agencies by ridership
- List of bus rapid transit systems in North America
- List of bus operating companies
- List of rail transit systems in the United States
- List of trolleybus systems in the United States
- National Transit Database
