= Richland County Transit =

Bus network serving Richland County, Ohio, United States

- Headquarters: 232 North Main Street
- Locale: Mansfield, Ohio
- Service area: Richland County, Ohio
- Service type: bus service, paratransit
- Routes: 13
- Website: www.rctbuses.com/

Richland County Transit is the provider of mass transportation in Mansfield, Ohio. Nine routes operate Monday through Friday. Over 500 signed stops are located within the system.

Routes
Number	Name
Route 1	Park Ave. West
Route 2	Lexington/W. Cook
Route 3	South Main St./Southside
Route 5	Springmill St./Bowman
Route 7	Wayne/East Mansfield
Route 8	Glessner/Marion
Route 9	West Fourth Street
Route 13	NCSC/Kehoe/Shelby
Route 15	Airport Industrial Park

== See also ==
- List of bus transit systems in the United States
- Allen County Regional Transportation Authority
