= Hiawathaland Transit =

Provider of mass transportation in Southern Minnesota

- Locale: Faribault, Northfield and Red Wing, Minnesota
- Service area: Goodhue, Rice and Wabasha counties, Minnesota
- Service type: Bus service, paratransit
- Routes: 9
- Fleet: 12 buses
- Annual ridership: 283,931 (2019)
- Website: Hiawathaland Transit

Hiawathaland Transit is the primary provider of mass transportation in Faribault, Northfield and Red Wing, Minnesota with nine routes serving the region in addition to countywide demand-response services in three counties. It is a service of Three Rivers Community Action. As of 2019, the system provided 283,931 rides over 55,108 annual vehicle revenue hours with 12 buses and 8 paratransit vehicles.

== History ==
Since the late 2010s, Hiawathaland Transit has expanded with greater dial-a-ride service hours, and the launch of the Faribault Northfield Connector. In 2022, Hiawathaland Transit redesigned the routes serving Red Wing, with the new routes launching on January 2, 2023. While the new routes served a greater area, headways for the routes were reduced from 45 minutes to one hour.

== Service ==
Hiawathaland Transit operates nine deviated fixed-route bus routes. Two routes serve Faribault, three routes serves Northfield, three routes serve Red Wing, and one regional route connects Faribault and Northfield. Hours of operation for the fixed-route system are Monday through Friday from 6:00 A.M. to 6:00 P.M. for all routes except the Northfield Express Route. This route operates from 3:00 P.M. to 10:00 P.M. Monday through Saturday when the local colleges are in session. Regular fares are $1.25 for the local routes and $3.50 for the Connect Route.

=== Routes ===
- Red Route (Faribault)
- Blue Route (Faribault)
- Red Route (Northfield)
- Blue Route (Northfield)
- Express Route (Northfield)
- Red Route (Red Wing)
- Blue Route (Red Wing)
- Green Route (Red Wing)
- Faribault Northfield Connect (Faribault - Northfield)

== Fixed route ridership ==
The ridership statistics shown here are of fixed route services only and do not include demand response services.

== See also ==
- List of bus transit systems in the United States
- Southern Minnesota Area Rural Transit
