= Tiger Transit (Alabama) =

Provider of transportation in Lee County, Alabama

- Headquarters: 330 Lem Morrison Drive
- Locale: Auburn, Alabama
- Service area: Auburn University
- Service type: Bus service, paratransit
- Routes: 22
- Hubs: Melton Student Center / Mell Street Station
- Fleet: 70 buses
- Website: Tiger Transit

Tiger Transit is a provider of transportation in Auburn, Alabama, with 22 routes serving Auburn University students, faculty, and staff.

== Service ==
Tiger Transit operates 22 routes, with seven on-campus routes, fifteen off-campus routes, and a special shopping shuttle.

During the fall and spring semesters, most routes are in operation from 7:00 am - 8:00 pm, with two routes ceasing operation at 6:00 pm.

During the summer semester, all routes are in operation from 7:00 am - 5:00 pm.

Routes only operate on weekdays while the university is in session.

Tiger Transit provides service to over 120 stops across Auburn, Alabama.

== See also ==
- List of bus transit systems in the United States
