= Prairie Lakes Transit =

Provider of mass transportation in Faribault and Martin counties, Minnesota

- Locale: Blue Earth and Fairmont, Minnesota
- Service area: Faribault and Martin counties, Minnesota
- Service type: Bus service, paratransit
- Routes: 3
- Annual ridership: 58,148 (2019)
- Website: Prairie Lakes Transit

Prairie Lakes Transit is the primary provider of mass transportation in Blue Earth and Fairmont, Minnesota with three routes serving the region in addition to countywide demand-response service. As of 2019, the system provided 58,148 rides over 28,717 annual vehicle revenue hours with 3 buses and 6 paratransit vehicles.

== History ==
Prairie Lakes Transit was formed at the beginning of 2016, when the individual transit services of Martin and Faribault counties were consolidated allowing for improved service in the region. Originally, Fairlakes Transportation operated the service, but since October 1, 2016, the service has been directly operated by the Faribault and Martin County Transit Board. In 2022, the agency received funding for an electric bus to join the fleet and serve Fairmont.

== Service ==
Prairie Lakes Transit operates three weekday bus routes with two routes serving Fairmont and one route serving Blue Earth. Hours of operation for the fixed-route system are Monday through Friday from 6:10 A.M. to 5:35 P.M. There is no service on Saturdays and Sundays for the fixed-route services. Regular fares are $2.00.

=== Routes ===
- Red Route (Fairmont)
- Green Route (Fairmont)
- Blue Route (Blue Earth)

== Fixed route ridership ==
The ridership statistics shown here are of fixed route services only and do not include demand response services.

== See also ==
- List of bus transit systems in the United States
- Southern Minnesota Area Rural Transit
