= Namekagon Transit =

Provider of mass transportation in Sawyer County, Wisconsin

- Headquarters: 14760 W County Highway B
- Locale: Hayward, Wisconsin; Lac Courte Oreilles Reservation
- Service area: Sawyer, Washburn, Barron, and southern Bayfield counties, Wisconsin
- Service type: Bus service, paratransit
- Routes: 3
- Hubs: Sevenwinds Casino
- Annual ridership: 67,886 (2022)
- Website: Namekagon Transit

Namekagon Transit is the primary provider of mass transportation in Hayward, Wisconsin and the Lac Courte Oreilles Reservation with three routes serving the region. The name "Namekagon" in the Ojibwe language means "place of the sturgeon". As of 2021, the system provided 58,404 rides over 32,795 annual vehicle revenue hours with 16 vehicles.

The transit system is a joint operation of Sawyer County and the Lac Courte Oreilles Band of Lake Superior Chippewa Indians. While Namekagon Transit primarily serves Hayward and the surrounding LCO reservation, demand-response service is available in four counties. Previously, Burnett County was also served by the system.

== Service ==
Namekagon Transit operates three weekday deviated fixed-route bus routes on a pulse system with all routes serving the LCO Sevenwinds Casino on the half hour. Hours of operation for these routes are Monday through Friday from 8:30 A.M. to 5:20 P.M. There is no service on Saturdays and Sundays. Regular fares are $2.00.

=== Routes ===
- Route 30 (Green)
- Route 40 (Yellow)
- Route 50 (Red)

== See also ==
- List of bus transit systems in the United States
- Bay Area Rural Transit
