= Gadsden Trolley System =

Provider of mass transportation in Etowah County, Alabama

- Headquarters: 2000 W. Meighan Blvd
- Locale: Gadsden, Alabama
- Service area: Etowah County, Alabama
- Service type: Bus service, paratransit
- Routes: 4
- Hubs: 4th St Transfer Station
- Fleet: 5 buses
- Annual ridership: 63,912 (2022)
- Website: Gadsden Trolley System

Gadsden Trolley System is the primary provider of mass transportation in Gadsden, Alabama, with four routes serving the region. It is a service of Gadsden Transit Services. As of 2019, the system provided 105,904 rides over 25,374 annual vehicle revenue hours with 5 buses and 8 paratransit vehicles.

== History ==
Public transit in Gadsden began with horsecars in 1887, with the Gadsden Land & Improvement Co. In 1899, streetcars began plying the streets, although these would be replaced by buses in 1933. Beginning in January 2023, fares for seniors, those on Medicaid, and disabled veterans were lowered to $0.25.

== Service ==
Gadsden Trolley System operates four hourly bus routes on a pulse system with three routes departing the Fourth Street Transfer Station on the hour. Regular fares are $1.00.

=== Routes ===
- Trolley Route East (GSCC)
- Trolley Route East (GRMC)
- Trolley Route Central
- Trolley Route West

== Fixed route ridership ==
The ridership statistics shown here are of fixed route services only and do not include demand response services.

== See also ==
- List of bus transit systems in the United States
