= Vicksburg Area Transit System =

Bus transportation provider in Warren County, Mississippi

- Headquarters: 2501 Halls Ferry Rd
- Locale: Vicksburg, Mississippi
- Service area: Warren County, Mississippi
- Service type: bus service, paratransit
- Routes: 4

The Vicksburg Area Transit System, marketed as the N-Route, is the primary provider of mass transportation in Warren County, Mississippi. Four routes provide weekday service. In honor of the region's blues musical heritage, buses entertain riders by playing classic songs of this style while en route.

== Routes ==
- 1 Kings/Casino
- 2 River Region/Vicksburg Mall
- 3 Clay Street - North/South
- Trolley Route

== See also ==
- List of bus transit systems in the United States
