= Goose Creek Transit =

Provider of mass transportation in Sheridan County, Wyoming

- Headquarters: 211 Smith St
- Locale: Sheridan, Wyoming
- Service area: Sheridan County, Wyoming
- Service type: Bus service, paratransit
- Routes: 1
- Stops: 38
- Fleet: 4 buses
- Annual ridership: 41,661 (2021)
- Website: Goose Creek Transit

Goose Creek Transit is the primary provider of mass transportation in Sheridan, Wyoming with one route serving the region. It is a service of the Hub on Smith senior citizens council. As of 2021, the system provided 41,661 rides over 23,588 annual vehicle revenue hours with 4 buses and 10 paratransit vehicles.

== History ==
Public transit in Sheridan began with streetcars by 1910, with the Sheridan Railway Co. However, streetcar service only lasted until 1924. In October 2019, Goose Creek Transit began providing Sheridan with fixed-route service, in addition to the senior transportation previously offered. While fixed route services were temporarily suspended in early 2020, they resumed on June 1. The bus route began with an initial 28 stops and one bus, but has since grown to 38 stops and four buses.

== Service ==
Goose Creek Transit operates one bus route around Sheridan in addition to dial-a-ride service. Hours of operation for the system are Monday through Friday from 7:00 A.M. to 6:30 P.M. and from 8:00 A.M. to 1:00 P.M. on weekends. There is no set fare, however, a $2 donation is suggested.

== Fixed route ridership ==
The ridership statistics shown here are of fixed route services only and do not include demand response services.

== See also ==
- List of bus transit systems in the United States
- Jefferson Lines
