= Phenix City Express =

Provider of mass transportation in Russell County, Alabama

- Locale: Phenix City, Alabama
- Service area: Russell County, Alabama
- Service type: Bus service, paratransit
- Routes: 2
- Fleet: 4 buses
- Annual ridership: 20,271 (2023)
- Website: Phenix City Express

Phenix City Express is the primary provider of mass transportation in Phenix City, Alabama, with two routes serving the region. It is a service of the Lee-Russell Council of Governments. As of 2023, the system provided 20,271 rides over 25,374 annual vehicle revenue hours with 5 buses and 8 paratransit vehicles.

== Service ==
Phenix City Express operates two hourly bus routes from 8AM to 4PM on weekdays, one of which crosses the state line to connect with METRA Transit System in Columbus, Georgia. Regular fares are $1.00.

=== Routes ===
- North Route
- South Route

== Fixed route ridership ==
The ridership statistics shown here are of fixed route services only and do not include demand response services.

== See also ==
- List of bus transit systems in the United States
- METRA Transit System
