= The Bus (Stillwater) =

Provider of mass transportation in Payne County, Oklahoma

- Headquarters: 1006 West Hall of Fame Ave
- Locale: Stillwater, Oklahoma
- Service area: Payne County, Oklahoma
- Service type: Bus service, paratransit
- Routes: 10
- Hubs: Multimodal Transportation Terminal (MMTT)
- Fleet: 16 buses
- Annual ridership: 254,054 (2022)
- Website: The Bus

OSU-Stillwater Community Transit, branded as The Bus, is the primary provider of mass transportation in Stillwater, Oklahoma with ten routes serving the region. It is a service of Oklahoma State University, however the buses are available to the general public. As of 2019, the system provided 497,591 rides over 39,283 annual vehicle revenue hours with 16 buses and 3 paratransit vehicles.

== History ==
OSU-Stillwater Community Transit began operations in 2003 with service quickly growing. Ridership increased 187% from 2004 to 2005 and the system won the transit system of the year award from the Oklahoma Transit Association. In 2007, ground broke on the MMTT, with completion the following year. The facility has space for ten buses, an indoor waiting area, parking garage, and retail and office space.

== Service ==
The Bus operates ten bus routes on a pulse system with six of seven off-campus routes serving the MMTT either at 20 or 50 past the hour. There are three on-campus routes, which only run while OSU is in session, with headways of 10–20 minutes, compared to the 30 to 60 minute headways of off-campus routes.

Hours of operation for the system are Monday through Friday from 6:20 a.m. to 10:30 p.m. while OSU is in session, and until 7:00 p.m. during summer or other breaks. There is no service on Saturdays and Sundays. Regular fares are $0.75 for the public, while OSU students and staff ride for free. The on campus routes are entirely fare-free.

In tandem with The Bus, OSU operates the Big Orange Bus (BOB) between the MMTT in Stillwater and the OSU-Tulsa campus in Tulsa. Similar to The Bus, this service is open to the general public in addition to OSU students and staff.

=== Routes ===
==== Off Campus ====
- Blue Route
- Brown Route
- Gray Route
- Purple Route
- Scarlet Route
- White Route
- Green Route

==== On Campus ====
- Orange Route
- Black Route
- Gold Route

== Fixed route ridership ==
The ridership statistics shown here are of fixed route services only and do not include demand response services.

== See also ==
- List of bus transit systems in the United States
- Metropolitan Tulsa Transit Authority
