= Hermann Express =

Provider of mass transportation in Brown County, Minnesota

- Founded: October 5, 2022
- Headquarters: 100 North Broadway
- Locale: New Ulm, Minnesota
- Service area: Brown County, Minnesota
- Service type: Bus service, paratransit
- Routes: 1
- Stops: 17
- Website: Hermann Express

Hermann Express is a provider of mass transportation in New Ulm, Minnesota with one route serving the region. The service is provided by Brown County Human Services. Previously, bus service in New Ulm was provided by the private company New Ulm Bus Line, which operated from 1946 to 1961. The Hermann Express service launched on October 5, 2022, and provided free rides until April 1, 2023.

== Service ==
Hermann Express operates one bus route operating hourly in a loop around the city, making 17 stops. Hours of operation for the system are Monday through Friday from 7:00 A.M. to 12:00 P.M. and 1:00 P.M. to 6:00 P.M. Saturday service operates from 10:00 A.M. to 2:00 P.M. There is no service on Sundays. Regular fares are $1.00.

== See also ==
- List of bus transit systems in the United States
- Mankato Transit System
