= Geauga County Transit =

Geauga County Transit is the transit bus agency serving Geauga County, Ohio. It operates demand-responsive (door-to-door) transit buses, including out-of-county service. Geauga Transit only operates weekdays from 6 AM to 9 PM.

Cleveland's RTA, a neighboring transit agency, provides service near the Cuyahoga-Geauga County border where connections can be made. Laketran also provides connecting services in Concord.

Geauga Transit fares are accepted in cash with exact change required. Discounts are available where applicable, while care attendants can ride for free. Stopovers up to 5 minutes are subject to an additional $1 fee.

== See also ==
- List of bus transit systems in the United States
