= Frankfort Transit =

Provider of mass transportation in Franklin County, Kentucky

- Locale: Frankfort, Kentucky
- Service area: Franklin County, Kentucky
- Service type: Bus service, paratransit
- Routes: 5
- Hubs: Clinton Street Transfer Hub
- Fleet: 4 buses
- Annual ridership: 168,494 (2019)
- Website: Frankfort Transit

Frankfort Transit is the primary provider of mass transportation in Frankfort, Kentucky with five routes serving the region. As of 2019, the system provided 168,494 rides over 45,964 annual vehicle revenue hours with 4 buses and 20 paratransit vehicles.

== History ==
Public transit in Frankfort began with streetcars on March 28, 1894, with the Capital Railway Co. Buses were introduced in 1926, and the streetcars were discontinued in 1934. After a survey in February 2019 indicated 70% of riders were dissatisfied with the service, the transit system was revamped to streamline service and reduce transfers. On May 9, 2023, ground was broken on a new transit center and parking garage just north of downtown Frankfort. The $6.75 million project consists of a bus transfer area, offices for Frankfort Transit, and a 300 space parking garage.

== Service ==
Frankfort Transit operates three weekday bus routes, and two Saturday routes, on a pulse system with all routes serving the Clinton Street Transfer Point.

Hours of operation for the system are weekdays from 6:45 A.M. to 6:35 P.M. and Saturdays from 8:45 A.M. to 3:05 P.M. There is no service on Sundays. Regular fares are $0.25.

=== Routes ===
==== Weekday ====
- East
- West
- Purple

==== Saturday ====
- East
- West

== Fixed route ridership ==
The ridership statistics shown here are of fixed route services only and do not include demand response services.

== See also ==
- List of bus transit systems in the United States
- Lextran
