= Dodger Area Rapid Transit =

Provider of mass transportation in Webster County, Iowa

- Headquarters: 530 1st Ave South
- Locale: Fort Dodge, Iowa
- Service area: Webster County, Iowa
- Service type: Bus service, paratransit
- Routes: 6
- Annual ridership: 100,941 (2019)
- Website: midascogia.net/transit_services/dart

Dodger Area Rapid Transit is the primary provider of mass transportation in Fort Dodge, Iowa with six routes serving the region. As of 2019, the system provided 100,941 rides over 16,998 annual vehicle revenue hours with 12 buses and 3 paratransit vehicles. The service is managed by the Mid-Iowa Development Association (MIDAS) Council of Governments.

== History ==
Public transit in Fort Dodge began with streetcars in 1903, with the Fort Dodge Light & Power Co. In 1925, the streetcars were replaced with bus service.

In 2020, service was temporarily discontinued from April 1 to May 21 as a result of the COVID-19 pandemic. As a result of a ridership drop due to the pandemic, the system faced funding challenges in 2021. The issue was exacerbated by a driver shortage that left the full operation of the system in question.

== Service ==
Dodger Area Rapid Transit operates 6 weekday bus routes on a pulse system with all routes leaving the central transfer point on the half hour. The transfer point is located at the corner of Central Avenue and 9th Street in downtown Fort Dodge.

Hours of operation for the system are Monday through Friday from 7:00 a.m. to 6:00 p.m. There is no service on Saturdays and Sundays. Regular fares are $1.50, with discounts for students and seniors.

== Ridership ==
The ridership statistics shown here are of fixed route services only and do not include demand response services.

== See also ==
- List of bus transit systems in the United States
