= ColumBUS =

Provider of mass transportation in Bartholomew County, Indiana

- Headquarters: 850 Lindsey Street
- Locale: Columbus, Indiana
- Service area: Bartholomew County, Indiana
- Service type: Bus service, paratransit
- Routes: 5
- Stations: Mill Race Station
- Annual ridership: 228,818 (2019)
- Website: ColumBUS

ColumBUS is the primary provider of mass transportation in Columbus, Indiana with five routes serving the region. As of 2019, the system provided 228,818 rides over 30,234 annual vehicle revenue hours with 5 buses and 5 paratransit vehicles.

== History ==
Public transit in Columbus began with mulecars in 1892, with the John S. Crump Street Railway. By 1901, the mulecars were replaced with streetcars, which in turn were replaced by buses in 1932. In 2020, fares were proposed to be increased for the first time in 40 years, from 25 to 50 cents. However, as of 2023, fares are indefinitely suspended.

In 2022, ColumBUS trialed a new Route 1, with dedicated stops, compared to the flag-down system in place.

== Service ==
ColumBUS operates 5 regular weekday bus routes on a pulse system with all routes departing Mill Race Station at 5 after the hour. Buses operate on a flag-down system with posted bus stops interspersed throughout the routes.

Hours of operation for the system are Monday through Friday from 6:00 A.M. to 8:00 P.M. and on Saturdays from 8:00 A.M. to 5:00 P.M. There is no service on Sundays. The service is fare free.

== Mill Race Station ==
Mill Race Station, located at 850 Lindsey St, is the primary transfer point for ColumBUS. The transfer point features an indoor waiting area, restrooms, and five bus bays. The facility opened on March 31, 2011, northwest of downtown Columbus. The location along the railroad line would allow easy transfers to passenger trains if passenger rail service were to return to Columbus.

== Fixed route ridership ==
The ridership statistics shown here are of fixed route services only and do not include demand response services.

== See also ==
- List of bus transit systems in the United States
- Bloomington Transit
