= Brunswick Transit Alternative =

Discontinued transit service

- Headquarters: Service And Streets; 1238 W. 130th St.
- Locale: Brunswick, Ohio
- Service type: bus service
- Website: BTA

Brunswick Transit Alternative was the transit agency serving the city of Brunswick, Ohio. It operates two transit bus routes, the Red Line through the northern section of the city and the Green Line through the southern section of the city. In January 2017, BTA was absorbed by Medina County Public Transit.

== Connecting services ==
Greater Cleveland Regional Transit Authority, a neighboring transit agency, provides connecting services.

== See also ==
- List of bus transit systems in the United States
