= Pine Bluff Transit =

Provider of mass transportation in Jefferson County, Arkansas

- Founded: 1974
- Headquarters: 2300 E. Harding Avenue
- Locale: Pine Bluff, Arkansas
- Service area: Jefferson County, Arkansas
- Service type: Bus service, paratransit
- Routes: 8
- Hubs: 2nd Avenue and Main Street
- Annual ridership: 44,571 (2022)
- Website: Pine Bluff Transit

Pine Bluff Transit is the primary provider of mass transportation in Pine Bluff, Arkansas with eight routes serving the region. As of 2019, the system provided 60,572 rides over 16,038 annual vehicle revenue hours with 4 buses and 2 paratransit vehicles.

== History ==
Public transit in Pine Bluff began in 1870, making it the oldest transit system in Arkansas. During its history, Pine Bluff operated mulecars, then streetcars, and buses since 1936. Since 1974, the system has been operated by the city of Pine Bluff.

== Service ==
Pine Bluff Transit operates 8 regular weekday bus routes on a pulse system with all routes meeting at 2nd Avenue and Main Street. Routes generally run at hourlong headways with variating routes meeting at either the hour or half hour downtown.

Hours of operation for the system are Monday through Friday from 6:00 A.M. to 6:00 P.M. There is no service on Saturdays and Sundays. Regular fares are $1.00.

=== Routes ===
- 1. East Harding
- 2. South Main St.
- 3. University Ave.
- 4. Dollarway
- 5. West 13th Avenue
- 6. Hazel & 28th Ave.
- 7. 17th Ave. & Miramar Ave.
- 8. Cherry St.

== Fixed route ridership ==
The ridership statistics shown here are of fixed route services only and do not include demand response services.

== See also ==
- List of bus transit systems in the United States
- Jonesboro Economical Transit
