= Hibbing Area Transit =

Former provider of mass transportation in St. Louis County, Minnesota

- Headquarters: 401 East 21st Street
- Locale: Hibbing, Minnesota
- Service area: St. Louis County, Minnesota
- Service type: Bus service, paratransit
- Routes: 1
- Fleet: 1 bus
- Annual ridership: 18,218 (2021)
- Website: hibbingmn.gov (archived; service ended in 2024)

Hibbing Area Transit was the primary provider of mass transportation in Hibbing, Minnesota, with one route serving the region. As of 2019, the system provided 53,890 rides over 9,382 annual vehicle revenue hours with 1 bus and 2 paratransit vehicles.

On August 1, 2024, the City of Hibbing officially discontinued Hibbing Area Transit. All transit operations in the city were absorbed by Arrowhead Transit, which expanded its regional service to include Hibbing. The transition introduced extended service hours and additional regional route connections.

== Service ==
Hibbing Area Transit operated one bus route around Hibbing that ran with deviated fixed-route service, making only three regular stops. Hours of operation were Monday through Thursday from 9:00 A.M. to 7:30 P.M., Friday from 9:00 A.M. to 6:30 P.M., and weekends from 9:00 A.M. to 4:30 P.M. Demand-response services had extended hours. Regular fares were $2.00.

== Fixed route ridership ==
The ridership statistics shown here are of fixed route services only and do not include demand response services.

== See also ==
- List of bus transit systems in the United States
