= Cass Area Transit =

Provider of mass transportation in Cass County, Indiana

- Locale: Logansport, Indiana
- Service area: Cass County, Indiana
- Service type: Bus service, paratransit
- Routes: 1
- Annual ridership: 148,423 (2019)
- Website: Cass Area Transit

Cass Area Transit is the primary provider of mass transportation in Logansport, Indiana, with one route serving the region. As of 2019, the system provided 148,423 rides over 71,225 annual vehicle revenue hours with two buses and 24 paratransit vehicles.

== History ==
Public transit in Logansport began with mulecars in 1883, with the Logansport Street Railway Co. From 1891 to 1892, the mulecars were replaced with streetcars, which in turn were replaced by buses in 1932. The Logansport city bus added Saturday service in 2016, alongside extended hours and new stops.

== Service ==
Cass Area Transit operates one bus route with deviated fixed-route service in Logansport, in addition to demand-response service throughout the county. Hours of operation for the system are Monday through Friday from 8:00 A.M. to 5:00 P.M. and on Saturdays from 9:00 A.M. to 5:00 P.M. There is no service on Sundays. The Logansport city bus was previously fare-free, but as of 2023, is $2.00 for a regular fare.

== Fixed route ridership ==
The ridership statistics shown here are of fixed route services only and do not include demand response services.

== See also ==
- List of bus transit systems in the United States
- Kokomo City-Line Trolley
