= Medina County Transit =

Public transit agency

Medina County Transit is the transit agency serving Medina County, Ohio and the city of Medina. It operates local routes, and specialized transit bus services.

MCT connects with Greater Cleveland Regional Transit Authority, a neighboring transit agency operating in Cuyahoga County.

The service runs a couple of scheduled local routes, and then has on-demand service subject to availability by contacting the department directly.

== See also ==
- List of bus transit systems in the United States
