= Owensboro Transit System =

Transit system serving Daviess County, Kentucky, United States

- Headquarters: 101 E. 4th Street
- Locale: Owensboro, Kentucky
- Service area: Daviess County, Kentucky
- Service type: bus service, paratransit
- Routes: 8
- Annual ridership: 1,000 (2024)
- Website: transit.owensboro.org

The Owensboro Transit System, is the primary provider of mass transportation in Daviess County, Kentucky. Eight routes traverse various urbanized sectors of the region. In 2024, the system had a ridership of 1,000.

== Routes ==
All routes meet downtown at the OTS Office.

- Red Route through 2nd/4th Streets
- Blue Route through 7th/9th Streets to Audubon Plaza
- Yellow Route to Daymar and State Office Building
- Brown Route through Frederica Street to Towne Square Mall and Target
- Purple Route through Jr Miller Boulevard to Walmart
- Orange Route through Triplett/Breckenridge Streets and New Hartford Road to Owensboro Community and Technical College and Regional Campus of the Western Kentucky University
- Green Route to Commonwealth Plaza
- White Route through 4th Street to Owensboro Health Regional Hospital

== See also ==
- List of bus transit systems in the United States
