= Central Community Transit =

Provider of mass transportation in Western Minnesota

- Headquarters: 1320 22nd Street SW, Willmar, MN 56201
- Locale: Litchfield and Willmar, Minnesota
- Service area: Kandiyohi, Meeker and Renville counties, Minnesota
- Service type: Bus service, paratransit
- Routes: 2
- Fleet: 5 buses
- Annual ridership: 227,429 (2019)
- Website: Central Community Transit

Central Community Transit (CCT) is the primary provider of mass transportation in Litchfield and Willmar, Minnesota with two routes serving the region in addition to countywide demand-response services. As of 2019, the system provided 227,429 rides over 51,272 annual vehicle revenue hours with 5 buses and 27 paratransit vehicles.

== History ==
Central Community Transit began in 2015, when Kandiyohi Area Transit merged with Heartland Express of Renville County. A year later, Meeker County Public Transit joined CCT to form the present service area. In 2023, CCT received a $20,000 grant to allow for fare-free operations of the Willmar City Route from July 1 to December 31.

== Service ==
Central Community Transit operates two weekday deviated fixed-route bus routes with one route serving Litchfield and Willmar each. Hours of operation for the fixed-route system are Monday through Friday from 8:10 A.M. to 7:46 P.M. in Willmar and from 8:30 A.M. to 6:35 P.M. in Litchfield. There is no service on Saturdays and Sundays for the fixed-route services. Regular fares are $2.00, however, the Willmar City Route is fare free until the end of 2023. The Becker Bus Station at 4th Street SW and Becker Avenue SW provides a transfer location to intercity Jefferson Lines buses.

=== Routes ===
- Litchfield City Route
- Willmar City Route

== Fixed route ridership ==
The ridership statistics shown here are of fixed route services only and do not include demand response services.

== See also ==
- List of bus transit systems in the United States
