= Kingsport Area Transit System =

- Founded: 1995
- Headquarters: 109 Clay Street
- Locale: Kingsport, Tennessee
- Service area: Sullivan County, Tennessee; Hawkins County, Tennessee
- Service type: bus service, paratransit
- Routes: 5
- Website: kingsporttransit.org

The Kingsport Area Transit System, calling itself KATS, is the primary provider of mass transportation in Kingsport, Tennessee. The agency was established in 1995 and currently has five routes. Service operates on weekdays only, and all buses originate from a city center terminal.

== Routes ==
- 1 Downtown to Stone Dr
- 2 Downtown to Ft Henry Dr
- 3 Downtown to East Stone Commons
- 4 Downtown to Target Plaza
- 5 Downtown to Bradley St

== See also ==
- List of bus transit systems in the United States
