= Texarkana Urban Transit District =

Bus transportation provider in Texarkana

- Founded: October 2000
- Headquarters: 818 Elm Street
- Locale: Texarkana, Texas
- Service area: Bowie County, Texas; Miller County, Arkansas
- Service type: bus service paratransit service
- Routes: 8
- Destinations: Texarkana, Texas; Texarkana, Arkansas; Nash, Texas; Wake Village, Texas
- Hubs: T-LINE Transit Center (Texarkana, Texas)
- Annual ridership: 191,005 (2022)
- Website: www.t-linebus.org

The Texarkana Urban Transit District (TUTD) is the primary provider of public transit and paratransit services in the Texarkana metropolitan area, established in October 2000. TUTD is governed by the nine-member Texarkana Urban Transit Board, whose members are representatives of city governments in Texarkana, Texas, Texarkana, Arkansas, Nash, Texas, and Wake Village, Texas. TUTD operates eight fixed-route bus routes — branded as T-LINE — on Monday through Friday, excluding six designated holidays: New Year's Day, Memorial Day, Independence Day, Labor Day, Thanksgiving Day, and Christmas Day. The agency also operates in coordination with the Ark-Tex Council of Governments Rural Public Transit District (ATCOG RTD), which provides connecting services (branded as TRAX) to Cass, Delta, Franklin, Hopkins, Lamar, Morris, Red River and Titus counties in Texas, in addition TUTD's primary service area.

== Transit Center ==
The T-Line transit center serves as the primary transfer hub for the T-Line at 1402 Texas Boulevard. After receiving over $1 million in federal stimulus money in 2009, the T-Line broke ground on the $1.4 million project on February 18, 2010. The facility provides eight bus bays, a 6,000 square foot office space for the T-Line, and a 1950's style T-Line marquee. The transit center officially opened on September 30, 2011 replacing the former transfer location on East 3rd Street.

== Routes ==
- 1 State Line Avenue
- 2 East 9th Street
- 3 Highway 71 South
- 4 S. Lake Drive
- 5 Nash/Wake Village
- 6 Richmond Road
- 7 County Avenue / Moores Lane
- 8 Jefferson Avenue / Arkansas Boulevard

== See also ==
- List of bus transit systems in the United States
- Texarkana Union Station
