= Clarksville Transit System =

Mass transportation provider in Tennessee, US

- Founded: June 1, 1987
- Headquarters: 430 Boillin Lane
- Locale: Clarksville, Tennessee, and Oak Grove, Kentucky
- Service area: Montgomery County, Tennessee, and Christian County, Kentucky
- Service type: Bus service, paratransit
- Routes: 10
- Stations: CTS Transit Center
- Annual ridership: 687,534 (2019)
- Website: Clarksville Transit System

Clarksville Transit System (CTS) is the primary provider of mass transportation in Clarksville, Tennessee, with ten routes serving the region. As of 2019, the system provided 687,534 rides over 97,228 annual vehicle revenue hours with 18 buses and 11 paratransit vehicles.

== History ==
Public transit in Clarksville began with horsecars in 1885, with the Clarksville Street Railway Co. In 1896, the horsecars were replaced with streetcars, which in turn were replaced by buses in 1928. Numerous changes and improvements to the system took place in 2021. In March, CTS and Nashville State Community College teamed up to allow Nashville State students to ride for free. In September, CTS made route information available on Google Maps, and in December, CTS began offering mobile fares through Token Transit. However, despite these improvements, Route 1000 was cancelled in early 2022 due to low ridership.

== Service ==
Clarksville Transit System operates eight regular weekday bus routes on a pulse system with all routes serving the CTS Transit Center either on the hour or half hour. These eight routes are augmented by two routes which only operate when Austin Peay State University is in session. Routes 1 and 2 travel across the state line to Kentucky.

Hours of operation for the system are Monday through Friday from 4:40 A.M. to 8:50 P.M. and Saturday from 6:20 A.M. to 8:50 P.M. There is no service on Sundays. Regular fares are $1.50.

=== Routes ===
- Route 1 - Fort Campbell
- Route 2 - Tiny Town Road
- Route 3 - Cunningham Loop
- Route 4 - Peachers Mill Rd
- Route 5 - Hilldale
- Route 6 - Madison Street
- Route 7 - Governor Square Mall
- Route 8 - 101 Express/Hospital
- Route 900 - APSU South Loop (only when APSU is in session)
- Route 901 - APSU North Loop (only when APSU is in session)

== CTS Transit Center ==
The CTS Transit Center, located at 200 Legion Street, was opened April 4, 1992, at a cost of $881,000. The downtown facility serves as the primary transfer point of the system. It was designed by Rufus Johnson Associates and features an indoor waiting area, underground parking, and information desk. As of 2021, CTS is looking to relocate the transit center to a different site downtown.

== Fixed route ridership ==
The ridership statistics shown here are of fixed route services only and do not include demand response services.

== See also ==
- List of bus transit systems in the United States
