= Langlade County Public Transit =

Provider of mass transportation in Langlade County, Wisconsin

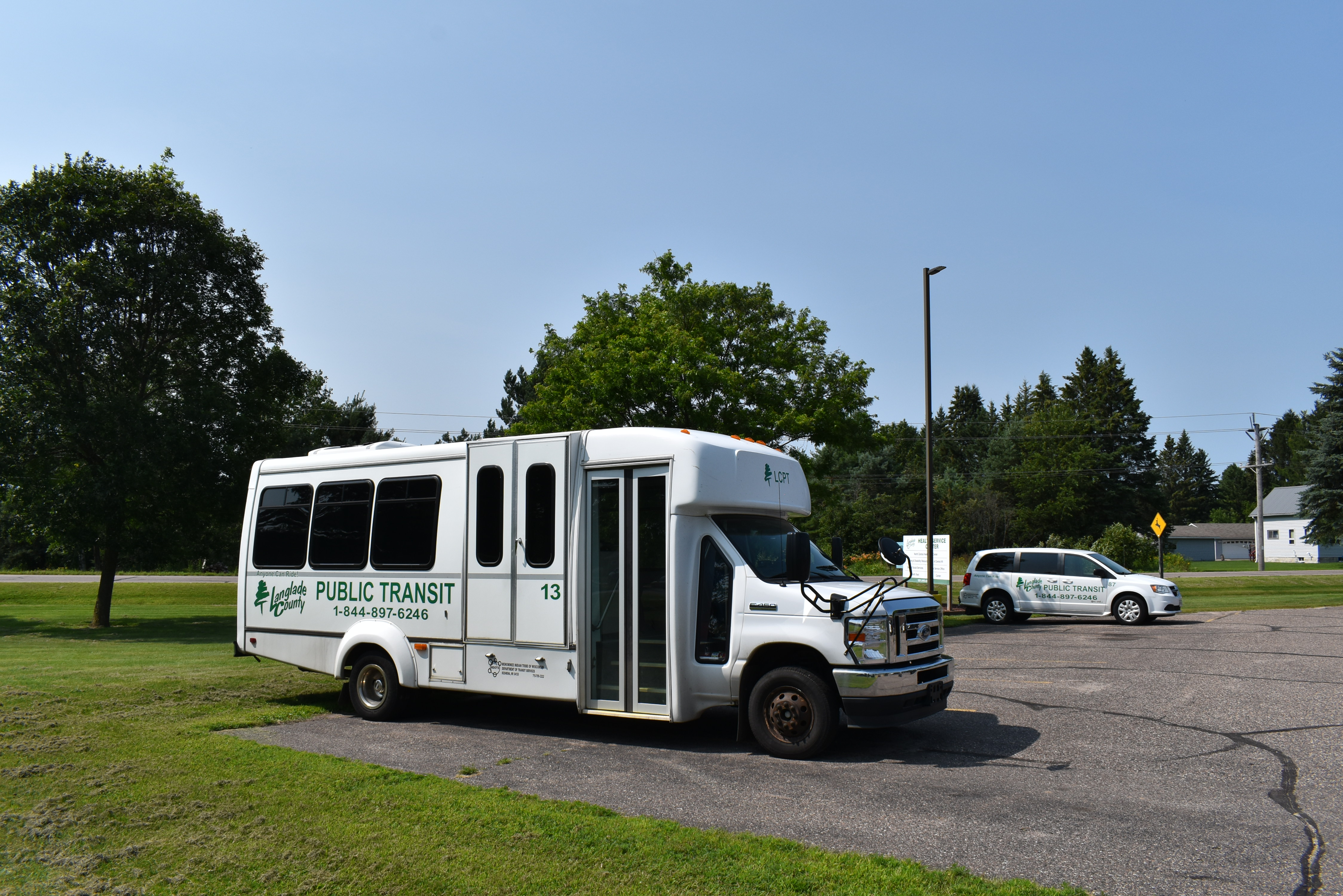
- Locale: Antigo, Wisconsin
- Service area: Langlade County, Wisconsin
- Service type: Bus service, paratransit
- Routes: 1
- Stops: 18
- Website: Langlade County Public Transit

Langlade County Public Transit is the primary provider of mass transportation in Antigo, Wisconsin with one deviated fixed-route serving the region in addition to demand-response service. Previously, the service was known as Red Robin Transit and provided four trips per day on the Antigo Flex Route and nearby paratransit service. In 2018, this was expanded to six trips per day within Antigo. Further changes came in 2020, when the service was expanded to include all of Langlade County and was therefore renamed to Langlade County Public Transit. It operates in partnership with the Menominee Department of Transit Services.

== Service ==
Langlade County Public Transit operates one weekday deviated fixed-route bus route around Antigo which runs five times per day from 9:15 A.M. to 5:20 P.M. serving 18 stops. There is no service on Saturdays and Sundays. Regular fares are $1.50. Demand-response service is available through Langlade County.

== See also ==
- List of bus transit systems in the United States
- Metro Ride
