= Starkville–MSU Area Rapid Transit =

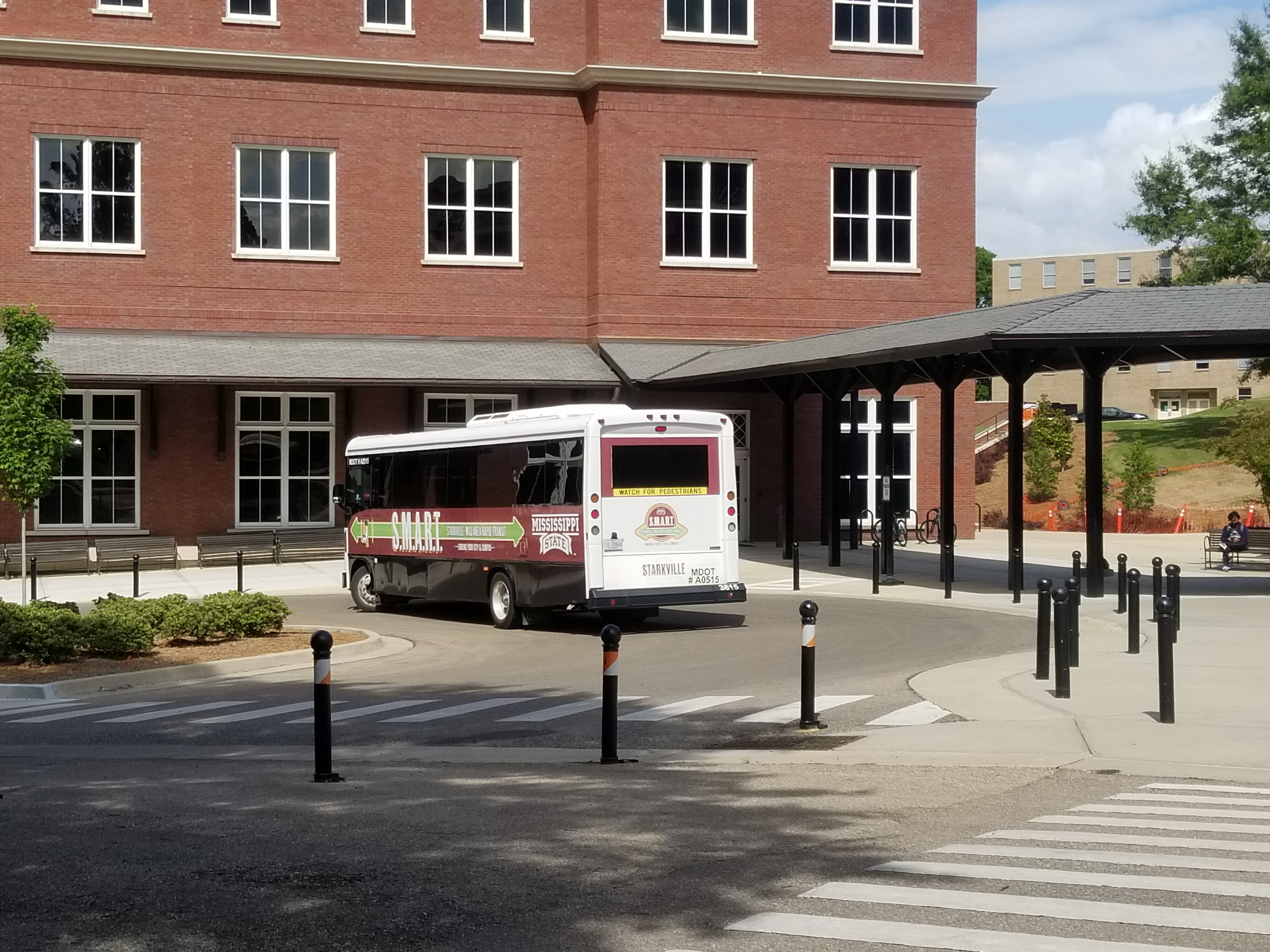
- A S.M.A.R.T. bus picking up passengers at the Old Main Academic Center Transit Hub
- Founded: 2013
- Headquarters: Mississippi State University
- Locale: Starkville, Mississippi
- Service type: Bus service Paratransit
- Routes: 11
- Stops: 71
- Hubs: Old Main Academic Center Transit Hub
- Operator: Mississippi State University

Starkville–MSU Area Rapid Transit (known as S.M.A.R.T.) operates fixed-route and an ADA paratransit demand response service throughout Mississippi State University and the City of Starkville, Mississippi, United States. As of April 2021, the entire S.M.A.R.T. system is free to use. Children under 16 must be accompanied by an adult to ride on the system.

== History ==
In 2013, the S.M.A.R.T. system was created from an expansion of the Mississippi State transportation system, a system of buses that ran throughout the campus. In 2014, routes for the system were expanded into Starkville itself. In 2015, the S.M.A.R.T. system was awarded as the Transportation System of the Year by the Mississippi Public Transit Association.

== Services ==
S.M.A.R.T. operates Monday through Friday from 7:00 a.m. to approximately 8:00 p.m. although a few routes only run until 6:00 pm. Saturday service is available from 7:00 a.m. to 8:00 p.m. on four routes, and the other routes not having weekend service. There is no service on Sundays or major holidays at this time.

All routes are interconnected, with many intersecting at the Old Main Academic Center Transit Hub at Mississippi State University. The routes that run throughout the Starkville area run all year. Several routes run only when the university is in session from August through May. The GTR Express route runs several times a day between the Golden Triangle Regional Airport, located in nearby Columbus, Mississippi, and two stops in Starkville.

Three routes, all running from August to May, run exclusively on the Mississippi State University campus. These routes are:

- MSU Central
- MSU North
- MSU South

Five other routes, all running throughout the year, run either exclusively in Starkville or between the Mississippi State University campus and Starkville. These routes are:

- Starkville North
- Starkville South
- Starkville East
- Starkville Central
- Starkville Connector

== Headquarters ==
S.M.A.R.T. is operated by MSU Parking and Transit Services. As of April 2021, buses are parked when not in use or when receiving maintenance at the transportation services compound on Buckner Lane.

== See also ==
- List of bus transit systems in the United States
