= University of Wyoming Transit System =

Provider of mass transportation in Albany County, Wyoming, U.S.

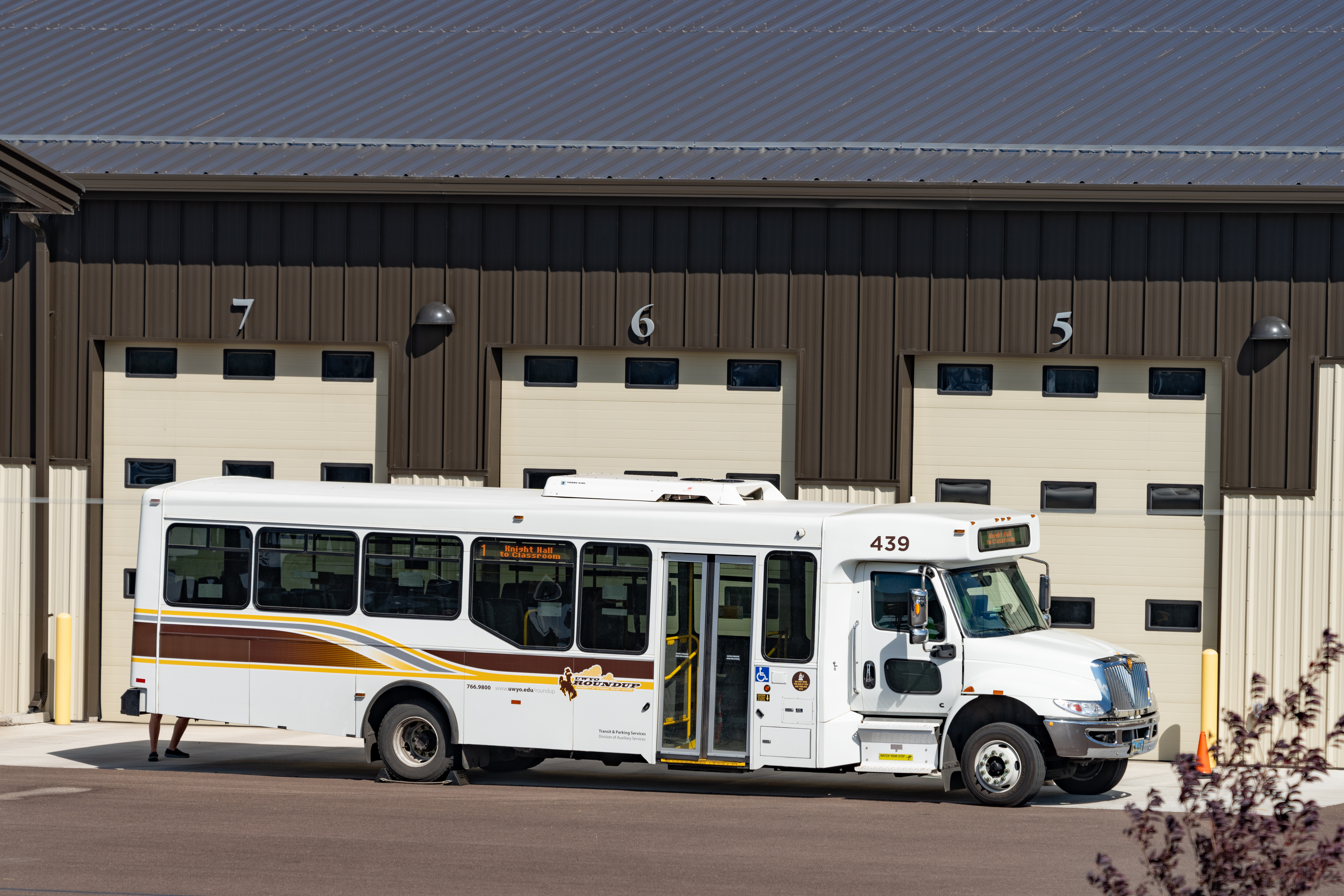
- Founded: 2002
- Headquarters: 2102 S. 15th St.
- Locale: Laramie, Wyoming, U.S.
- Service area: University of Wyoming
- Service type: Bus service; Paratransit
- Routes: 3
- Annual ridership: 626,093 (2019)
- Website: www.uwyo.edu/tps/transit/index.html

The University of Wyoming Transit System, branded as Roundup, is the primary provider of mass transportation in Laramie, Wyoming, United States, with three routes serving the region. While the service is mainly intended for students and staff at the University of Wyoming, it is open to the general public as well. As of 2019, the system provided 626,093 rides over 42,123 annual vehicle revenue hours with 11 buses and 7 paratransit vehicles.

The UW Transit System began operations in 2002, with a rebranding to Roundup in 2011. At the time, Roundup solely served the campus area, and so the Albany County Transportation Authority began bus service of its own in Laramie, named the Gem City Grand. However, this service only lasted until 2015 due to financial difficulties, and so Roundup service expanded to serve the areas of Laramie formerly served by Gem City Grand. In 2016, Roundup added an app to allow passengers to track the buses in real time.

== Service ==
Roundup operates three bus routes centered on the University of Wyoming campus with headways of 10 to 20 minutes. Hours of operation for the system are Monday through Friday from 6:30 A.M. to 10:30 P.M. There is no service on Saturdays and Sundays. The service is fare-free.

=== Routes ===
- Express
- Link
- Evening

== Fixed route ridership ==
The ridership statistics shown here are of fixed route services only and do not include demand response services.

== See also ==
- List of bus transit systems in the United States
- Greyhound Lines
