= Lafayette Transit System =

Public transportation operator in Louisiana

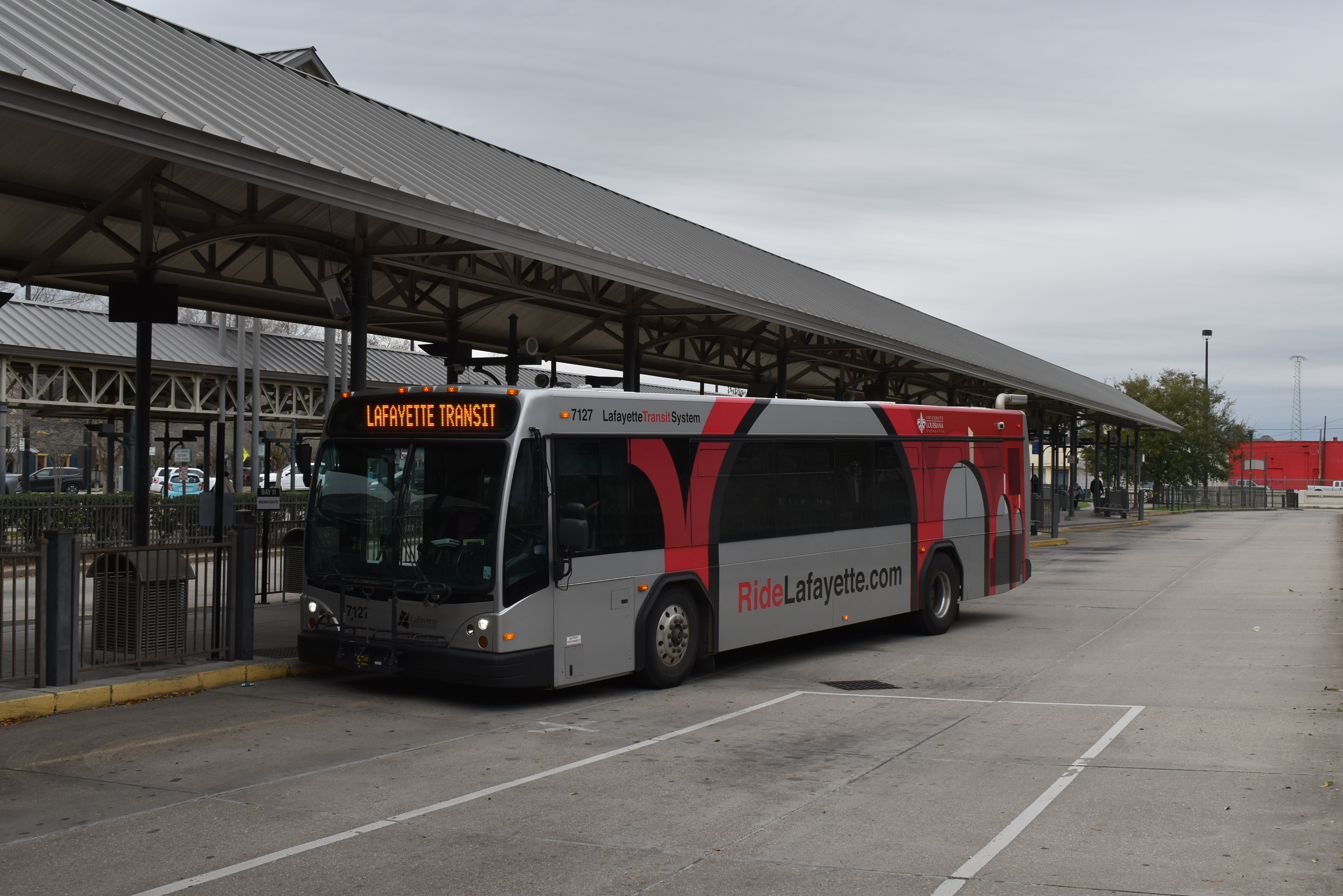
- A bus at the downtown terminal in February 2024
- Headquarters: 705 West University Avenue
- Locale: Lafayette, Louisiana
- Service area: Lafayette Parish, Louisiana
- Service type: bus service
- Routes: 13

Lafayette Transit System (LTS) is the operator of public transportation in metropolitan Lafayette, Louisiana.

== Routes ==
Thirteen (13) routes run daily except on Sunday, generally functioning at half hour or hour intervals. During the late evening and late night hours, buses keep running, with four routes covering specific zones of the city. All LTS buses are low floor and handicapped accessible, and each also features a bike rack.

Fixed-route bus service times are Monday through Saturday 5:45 AM - 10:30 PM. Beginning at 6:35 PM, LTS begins its Night Owl fixed route service with four (4) consolidated bus routes serving citizens from the Rosa Parks Transportation Center every hour. Last regular route buses depart from the Transportation Center at 9:30P M nightly.

LTS does not provide bus service on: New Year's Day, Martin Luther King Jr. Day, Mardi Gras Day, Good Friday, Memorial Day, Independence Day, Labor Day, Thanksgiving Day, and Christmas Day.

== Route list ==
- 10 Twelfth St.
- 15 Congress St./ UHC
- 20 Cameron St.
- 25 Johnson St./ Settlers Trace/ South Regional Library
- 30 MLK Ave/N. University Ave.
- 35 Madeline Ave.
- 45 Moss St.
- 50 Pierce Street
- 55a Oil Center/Kaliste Saloom/ LGMC
- 55b UL Lafayette/ Oil Center/S college
- 60 Louisiana Ave.
- 70 Pinhook Rd/Kaliste Saloon Rd./Lourdes
- 101 Red Route (Johnston/Ambassador Caffery/Kaliste Saloom/ Pinhook Rd.)
- 102 Green Route (Congress/Ambassador Caffery/Johnston)
- 103 Blue Route (Twelfth/La Avenue/Moss/Gloria Switch)
- 104 Brown Route (Pierce/Madeline/Cameron/MLK/University/Walker Rd.)

== See also ==
- List of bus transit systems in the United States
- Lafayette station
