= Casper Area Transit =

Provider of mass transportation in Natrona County, Wyoming

- Headquarters: 1715 E. 4th Street
- Locale: Casper, Wyoming
- Service area: Natrona County, Wyoming
- Service type: Bus service, paratransit
- Routes: 6
- Hubs: Downtown Transfer Station, 201 S Beech St
- Fleet: 6 buses
- Annual ridership: 75,629 (2019)
- Website: Casper Area Transit

Casper Area Transit is the primary provider of mass transportation in Casper, Wyoming with six routes serving the region. As of 2019, the system provided 213,403 rides over 40,389 annual vehicle revenue hours with six buses and seven paratransit vehicles.

== History ==
Beginning in 1982, the Casper Area was served by the Casper Area Transportation Coalition. On May 7, 2021, the city of Casper took over operations leading to the formation of the present system. However, due to a funding dispute and possible breach of contract, CATC filed a lawsuit against the city in 2022, which was resolved a year later.

In the summer of 2022, partially due to rising fuel prices, Casper Area Transit began formulating a plan to transition the fleet to electric buses. Later that year, new signage was installed at bus stops, to provide better information on services, such as routes and arrival times.

== Service ==
Casper Area Transit is separated into two divisions: Casper Area Link, which operates fixed-route services, and Casper Area Assist, which operates demand-response services. Link operates six hourly bus routes on a pulse system with four routes serving the Downtown Transfer Station on the half hour. Hours of operation for the system are Monday through Friday from 6:30 A.M. to 6:30 P.M. and on Saturdays from 7:30 A.M. to 3:30 P.M. There is no service on Sundays. Regular fares are $1.00.

=== Routes ===
- 2nd Street - Walmart East
- Blackmore - Evansville
- North Casper - I-25 Detour - Downtown - CY Avenue
- Casper College - 15th St
- Paradise Valley - Sunrise Area
- Walmart West - Mesa - Mills

== Fixed route ridership ==
The ridership statistics shown here are for fixed route services only and do not include demand response services.

== See also ==
- List of bus transit systems in the United States
