= Monroe Transit =

Monroe Transit System
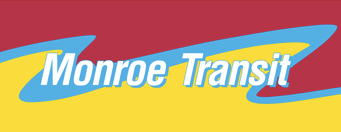
- Parent: City of Monroe, Louisiana
- Founded: 1906
- Headquarters: 700 Washington St, Monroe, LA 71201
- Locale: Monroe, Louisiana
- Service area: City of Monroe, Louisiana
- Service type: bus service
- Routes: 20
- Hubs: MTS Terminal, 207 Catalpa St., Monroe, LA 71201
- Website: mtsbus.org

Monroe Transit is the operator of public transportation in metropolitan Monroe, Louisiana. Since 1906, Monroe Transit, the nation's oldest publicly owned transportation system, has been continuously owned and operated by the City of Monroe. Over 100 years after its inception, Monroe Transit remains the public transportation provider to the City, offering twenty (20) regularly scheduled routes, as well as, paratransit services to the community.

Monroe Transit has a long, rich history. In 1903, at the urging of Mayor A.A. Forsythe, the Monroe City Council voted to begin the first municipal railroad in the United States. The city awarded a $100,000 contract to the Westinghouse Electrical Co. in 1904 to build the city-owned street railway. Construction began in May 1905 but was later delayed due to a yellow fever epidemic.

On June 11, 1906 Mayor Forsythe, city officials, and prominent Monroe residents made the first official run of the Monroe Municipal Street Railway. Revenue service on the four lines began June 15, 1906. By this time, West Seattle, WA had already begun the first municipally owned street railway, making Monroe the second in the U.S. to introduce this new model of public transportation.

The street railway continued to operate until 1938. Although many extensions were made to the railway throughout its operation, Monroe was expanding, making buses a more economical and practical option. The final streetcar ran down the Lee Avenue line on August 21, 1938 and the evolution of Monroe Transit as the modern transportation system we know today had officially begun.

In 2005, night service was also instituted and hours for regular routes were extended. Service is not currently provided on Sundays.

== Bus Routes ==
Route Number	Route Name
1	Desiard Street
2	Trolley Line
3	Twin City Mall
4	Marx Street
5	University Ave
6	Burg Jones Lane
7	EA Conway Hospital
8	Powell Avenue
9	Jackson Street
10	North Monroe
11	Bernstein Park
12	White Street
14	Pecanland Mall
15	Delta College
VOTECH Flyer	
Night Rider A	
Night Rider B	
Night Rider C	
Night Rider D	
