= Metro McAllen =

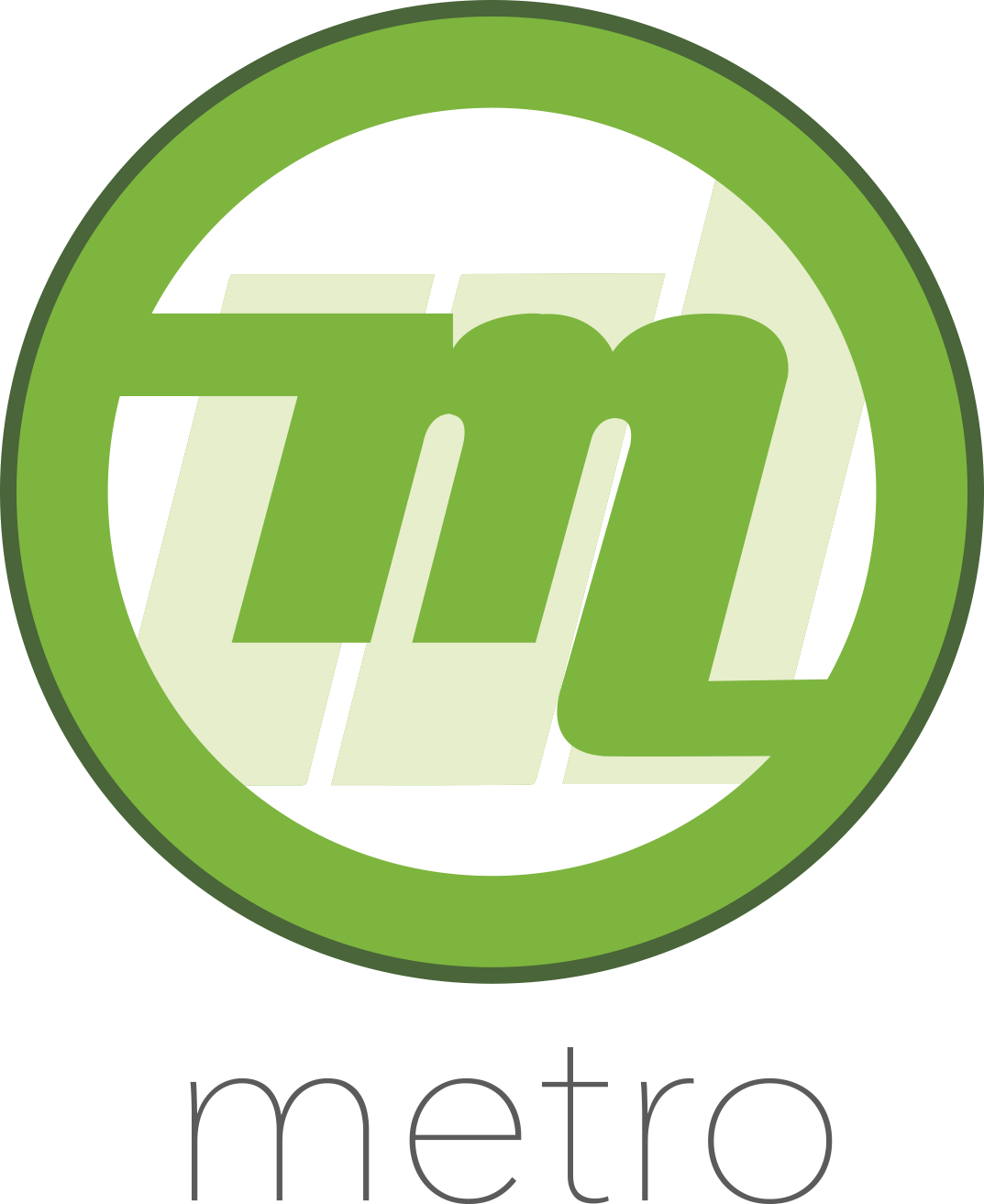
- Metro Logo
- Parent: City of McAllen
- Founded: 1997
- Headquarters: 1500 W. Highway 83
- Locale: McAllen, Texas
- Service area: Hidalgo County, Texas
- Service type: Bus service, paratransit, Micro Transit
- Alliance: City of McAllen
- Routes: 8 Local Bus Routes and Micro Transit as well as Paratransit services.
- Hubs: McAllen Central Station
- Lounge: McAllen Central Station
- Fleet: GILLIG Buses
- Website: https://www.mcallen.net/metro/

Metro McAllen (form. McAllen Express Transit) is the primary provider of mass transportation in Hidalgo County, Texas. The agency was established in 1997 in response to massive population growth. In 2001, the McAllen Central Station was opened in Downtown McAllen, which provides a transit hub for all local lines, as well as connects to a variety of domestic and international bus lines. The City of McAllen created the Transit Department that same year to help manage the recently created McAllen Central Station. In January 2005, the Transit Department took over operations of the McAllen Express Transit (MET). In February 2011, MET officially changed to Metro McAllen. The transit agency has grown to 8 routes currently and operates from Monday through Sunday. In fiscal year 2019, 637,360 people used these lines.

== Routes ==
Metro McAllen operates 8 routes for the City of McAllen. Operational hours are Monday through Saturday from 6:00 AM until 9:00 PM and Sundays from 6:00 AM until 6:00 PM. Individual route times operate at different intervals within operating hours.

- Route 1 - South 23rd St. / Foreign Trade Zone / Military Highway / South Texas College - Technology Campus
- Route 2 - North 10th St. / Trenton Rd. / North 23rd St. (Counterclockwise Loop)
- Route 3 - North 23rd St. / Trenton Rd. / North 10th St. (Clockwise Loop)
- Route 4 - La Plaza Mall / McAllen International Airport / Hospital District / Las Tiendas Plaza / South Texas College - Nursing & Allied Health Center / Texas A&M University Health Science Center
- Route 5 - McAllen Convention Center / Ware Rd. / South Texas College / Nolana Ave. / McColl Rd. / Pecan. Blvd. (Clockwise Loop)
- Route 6 - Pecan Blvd. / McColl Rd. / Nolana Ave. / Ware Rd. / South Texas College / Business 83 (Counterclockwise Loop)
- Route 7 - Colonel Rowe (2nd St.) / McColl Rd.
- Route 8 - Tres Lagos / Texas A&M University / Dove Ave. [NOT IN SERVICE]
- Route 9 - McAllen Public Library / UTRGV / Bicentennial Blvd.

Metro McAllen also operates Micro Transit named Micro McAllen and Paratransit service for the City of McAllen
