= Albany Transit System =

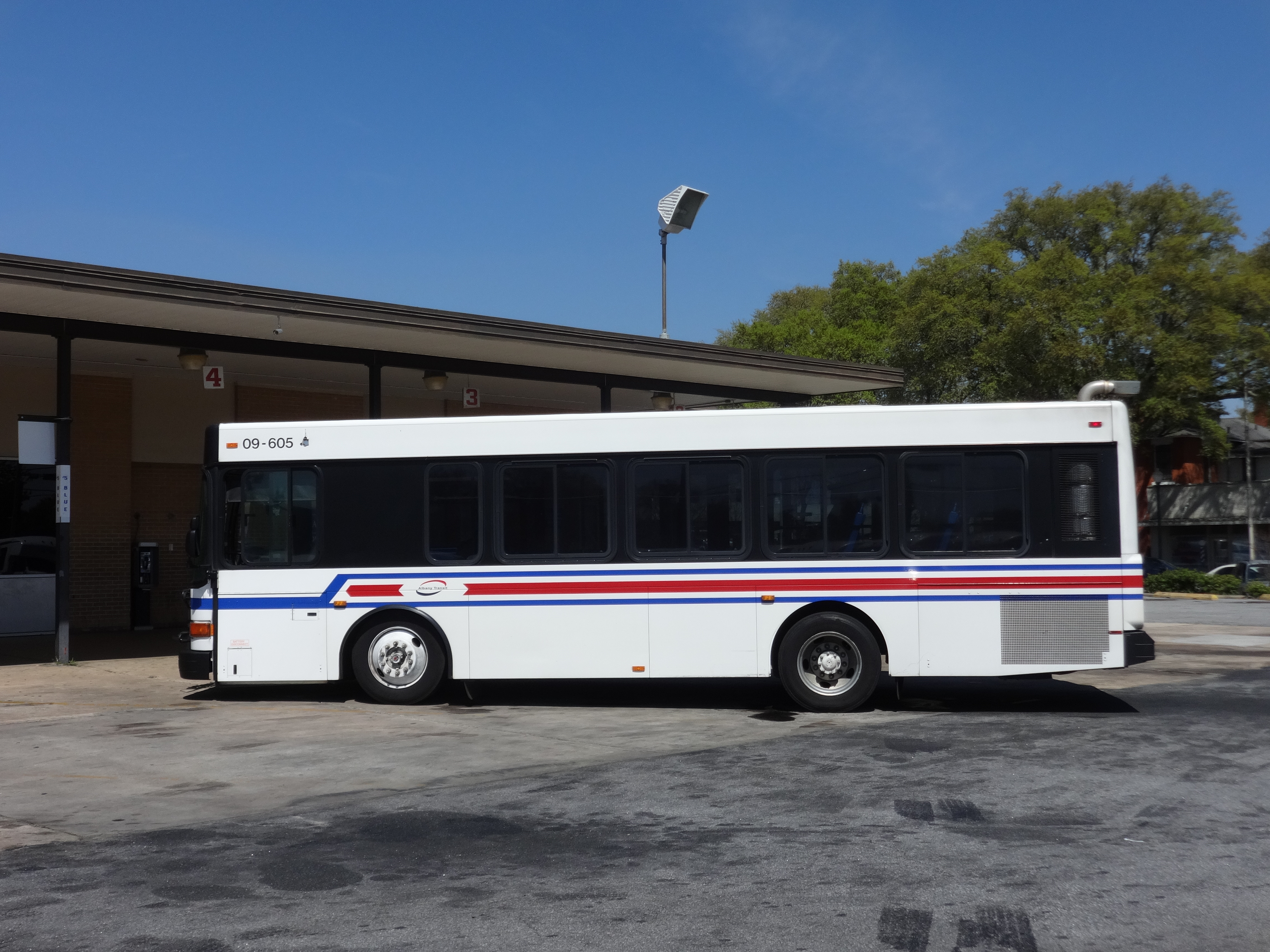
- Headquarters: 320 North Jackson Street
- Locale: Albany, Georgia
- Service area: Dougherty County, Georgia
- Service type: bus service, paratransit
- Routes: 10

The Albany Transit System is the primary provider of mass transportation in Dougherty County, Georgia. Buses run along ten local routes from Monday through Saturday.

== Routes ==
- 1 Jackson Heights
- 1X Turner
- 2 Albany State
- 3 Albany Mall
- 4 East Albany
- 4X Cooper
- 5 Brooks Plaza
- 6 Darton College
- 7 Newton/Oakridge
- 8 MLK

== Roster ==
Fleet number(s)	Thumbnail	Year	Manufacturer	Model	Engine	Transmission	Notes
428-03		2003	Gillig	Phantom 40'			
431-10		2010	Dodge/Ameritrans	R-Series 33'			
432-15		2014	Gillig	Low Floor 40'			
455-05		2005	Gillig	Low Floor 35'			
480-10		2016	New Flyer Industries/Alexander Dennis	MD35 35'			
481-15		2015	Gillig	Low Floor 35'			
