= Wichita Falls Transit System =

Bus transportation company in Wichita County, Texas

- Founded: 1971
- Headquarters: 2100 Seymour Highway
- Locale: Wichita Falls, Texas
- Service area: Wichita County, Texas
- Service type: Bus service Paratransit
- Routes: 7
- Website: wichitafallstx.gov/339/Falls-Ride---Public-Transportation

The Wichita Falls Transit System, marketed as Falls Ride, is the primary provider of mass transportation in Wichita County, Texas. Service began in 1978, following the takeover of the struggling private National City Lines. Seven routes are provided from Monday through Saturday.

== Routes ==
- 1 Eastside (Transit Center to Thompson Rd and Carolina St)
- 2 Central (Transit Center to Southwest Dr and Sikes Center Mall)
- 3 Southeast (Sikes Center Mall to Midwestern Pkwy and Bonny Dr)
- 4 North (Transit Center to Iowa Park and Sheppard AFB)
- 5 Southwest (Sikes Center Mall to Memorial Stadium and Allendale Dr)
- 6 Sheppard Express (Sheppard AFB to Transit Center and Sikes Center Mall)
- 7 Midwestern State Connector (Midwestern State University to Transit Center and Sikes Center Mall)
