= Metro Area Public Transit System =

MAPS Transit
- Founded: 1997
- Service area: Joplin Metropolitan Area
- Service type: Bus service, Paratransit, and Demand-responsive transit
- Routes: 3
- Website: https://www.joplinmo.org/365/Public-Transportation

The Metro Area Public Transit System, also known as MAPS, is a public transport service run by The City of Joplin, Missouri offering fixed-route bus service and demand-responsive transport.

== Services ==
=== Sunshine Lamp Trolley ===
The Sunshine Lamp Trolley was launched on July 30, 2007 with a singular route. By 2009, it had expanded to the 3 routes seen today.

Routes
Name	Color
West Route	Red
South Route	Green
Blue Route	Blue

==== Suspensions ====
On March 18, 2020, Trolley service was briefly suspended due to the COVID-19 pandemic.

On November 23, 2022, Trolley service was suspended due to a driver shortage. On February 3, 2025, The Sunshine Lamp Trolley had resumed service at full levels.

During both of these suspensions, MAPS was unaffected.

=== MAPS Transit ===
MAPS Transit begain in 1997 and provides door to door service within Joplin's greater metropolitan area.
