= Cascades East Transit =

Transit agency in Deschutes County, Oregon

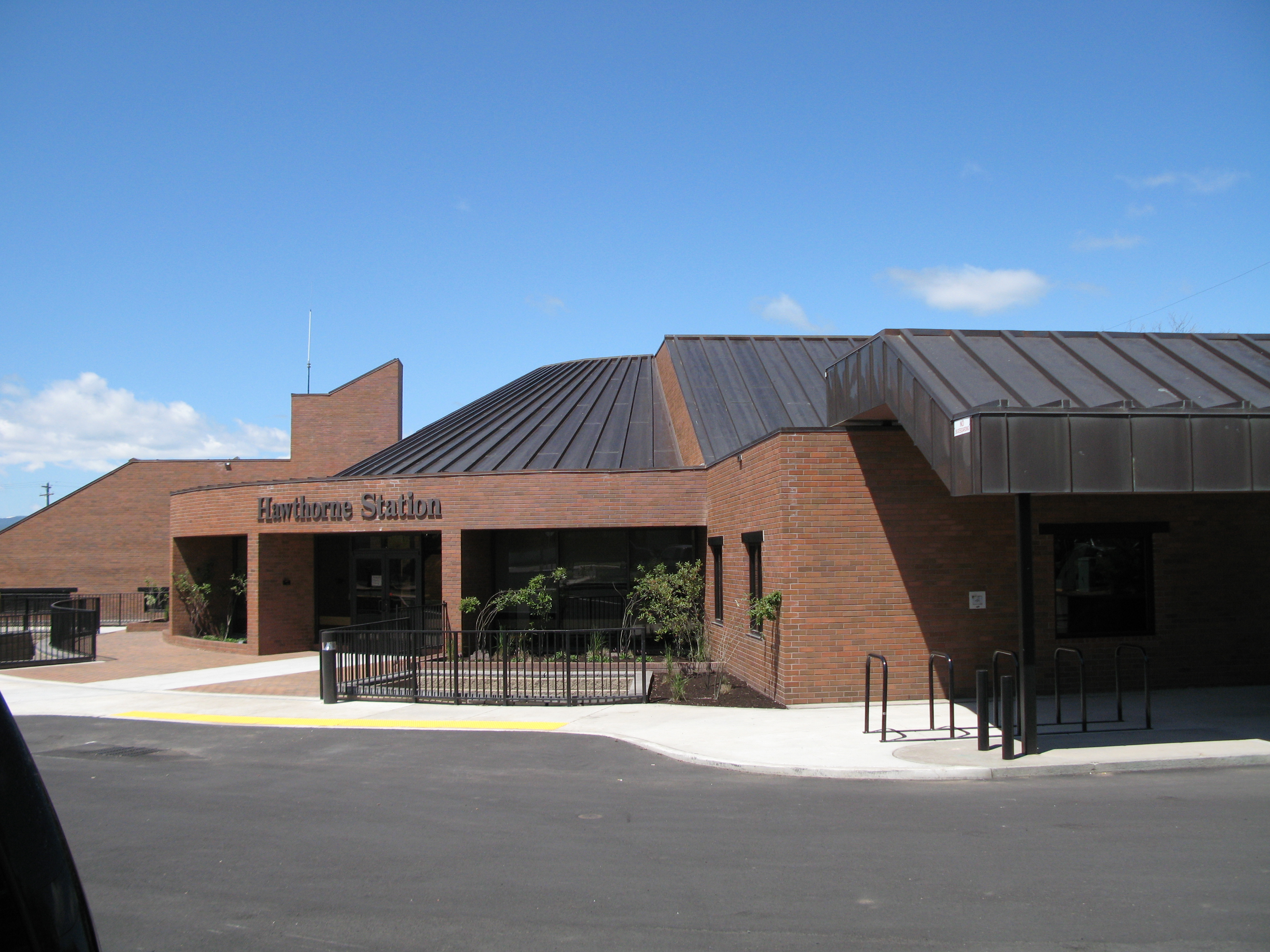
The Hawthorne Station provided by the Cascades East Transit, Hawthorne Avenue, Bend, Oregon

Cascades East Transit (CET) is a operates fixed-route bus service, dial-a-ride paratransit, and shuttles in Bend, Oregon and central Oregon state.

CET is operated by the Central Oregon Intergovernmental Council.

"Cascades East Transit went fare-free during the COVID pandemic in 2020, made possible by grants from the federal government." Starting in October 2025, CET will again charge riders.
