= Spartanburg Area Regional Transit Agency =

Bus transportation provider in Spartanburg County, South Carolina

- Headquarters: 100 Liberty St
- Locale: Spartanburg, South Carolina
- Service area: Spartanburg County, South Carolina
- Service type: bus service, paratransit
- Routes: 8
- Hubs: SPARTA Passenger Center
- Website: SPARTA

Spartanburg Area Regional Transit Agency, commonly known as SPARTA, is the provider of mass transportation in Spartanburg County, South Carolina. Eight routes run from Monday through Saturday, providing rides for nearly 6,000 citizens per year.

== Routes ==
SPARTA currently operates eight bus routes.

- Route 1: Westgate
- Route 2: Hillcrest
- Route 3: North Church Street
- Route 4: South Church Street
- Route 5: Spartanburg Community College
- Route 6: South Liberty Street
- Route 7: Crestview
- Route 8: Dorman Centre

== Holidays ==
SPARTA does not run on the following days:

- All Sundays
- New Year's Day
- Martin Luther King Jr. Day
- Memorial Day
- Independence Day
- Labor Day
- Thanksgiving Day
- Christmas Eve
- Christmas Day
