= Homestead Meadows, Texas =

Homestead Meadows may refer to:

- Homestead Meadows North, Texas
- Homestead Meadows South, Texas
