= Allen County Regional Transportation Authority =

- Headquarters: 200 East High Street
- Locale: Lima, Ohio
- Service area: Allen County, Ohio
- Service type: bus service, paratransit
- Routes: 7
- Daily ridership: 6,000 (weekdays, Q4 2024)
- Annual ridership: 212,800 (2024)
- Website: acrta.com

The Allen County Regional Transportation Authority is the primary provider of mass transportation in Lima, Ohio. Six routes provide standard weekday service, while an express bus runs as a seventh line to nearby Delphos, Ohio during rush hour. In 2024, the system had a ridership of 212,800, or about 6,000 per weekday as of the fourth quarter of 2024.

== Routes ==
- American Mall
- Delphos Express
- East Kibby/Rhodes State College
- North Main
- South Main
- West North Street
- Westside/Medical Center

== See also ==
- List of bus transit systems in the United States
