= Southern Minnesota Area Rural Transit =

Provider of mass transportation in Southern Minnesota

- Founded: 2014
- Headquarters: 2803 W Oakland Ave, Austin, MN
- Locale: Albert Lea, Austin, Owatonna, and Waseca
- Service area: Freeborn, Mower, Steele, and Waseca counties in Minnesota
- Service type: Bus service and demand-response service
- Routes: 6
- Hubs: Austin SMART Transit Office; Austin Mayo Health Systems
- Fleet: 13 buses
- Annual ridership: 272,878 (2019)
- Website: SMART Bus

Southern Minnesota Area Rural Transit (SMART) is a provider of mass transportation in Freeborn, Mower, Steele, and Waseca counties in Minnesota, with deviated fixed-routes serving the major cities, as well as demand-response service across the counties. The service is operated by Cedar Valley Services, Inc. In 2019 the system provided 272,878 rides over 62,048 annual vehicle revenue hours with 13 buses and 15 paratransit vehicles.

== History ==
SMART transit began in January 2014 through the consolidation of transit agencies in Freeborn, Mower and Steele counties. SMART transit service in Waseca began on January 2, 2016. On January 2, 2019, the intercity shuttle service between Albert Lea and Austin was launched after the approval of a state grant to fund the service. In 2022, SMART purchased an electric bus for service in Owatonna, the first in the fleet. Replacing a single fossil fuel powered bus will allow the agency to save 2,000-4,000 gallons of fuel each year. SMART reached its millionth rider in October 2018 and two million in March 2023.

== Service ==
SMART provides deviated fixed-route and demand-response services. There are 6 deviated fixed-routes, with one intercity shuttle between Albert Lea and Austin, two providing intra-city transit in Austin, and one each in Albert Lea, Owatonna, and Waseca.

=== Local Routes ===
- Austin Purple Route
- Austin Red Route
- City of Albert Lea Route
- City of Owatonna Route
- Waseca City Route

=== Intercity Routes ===
- SMART Transit Shuttle Service (serves Albert Lea and Austin)

=== Transfer Points ===
- Austin SMART Transit Office
- Austin Mayo Health Systems

== Fixed Route Ridership ==
The ridership statistics shown here are of deviated fixed route services only and do not include demand response services.

== See also ==
- List of bus transit systems in the United States
- Mankato Transit System
- Rochester Public Transit
