= Van Galder Bus Company =

Bus service based in Wisconsin, US

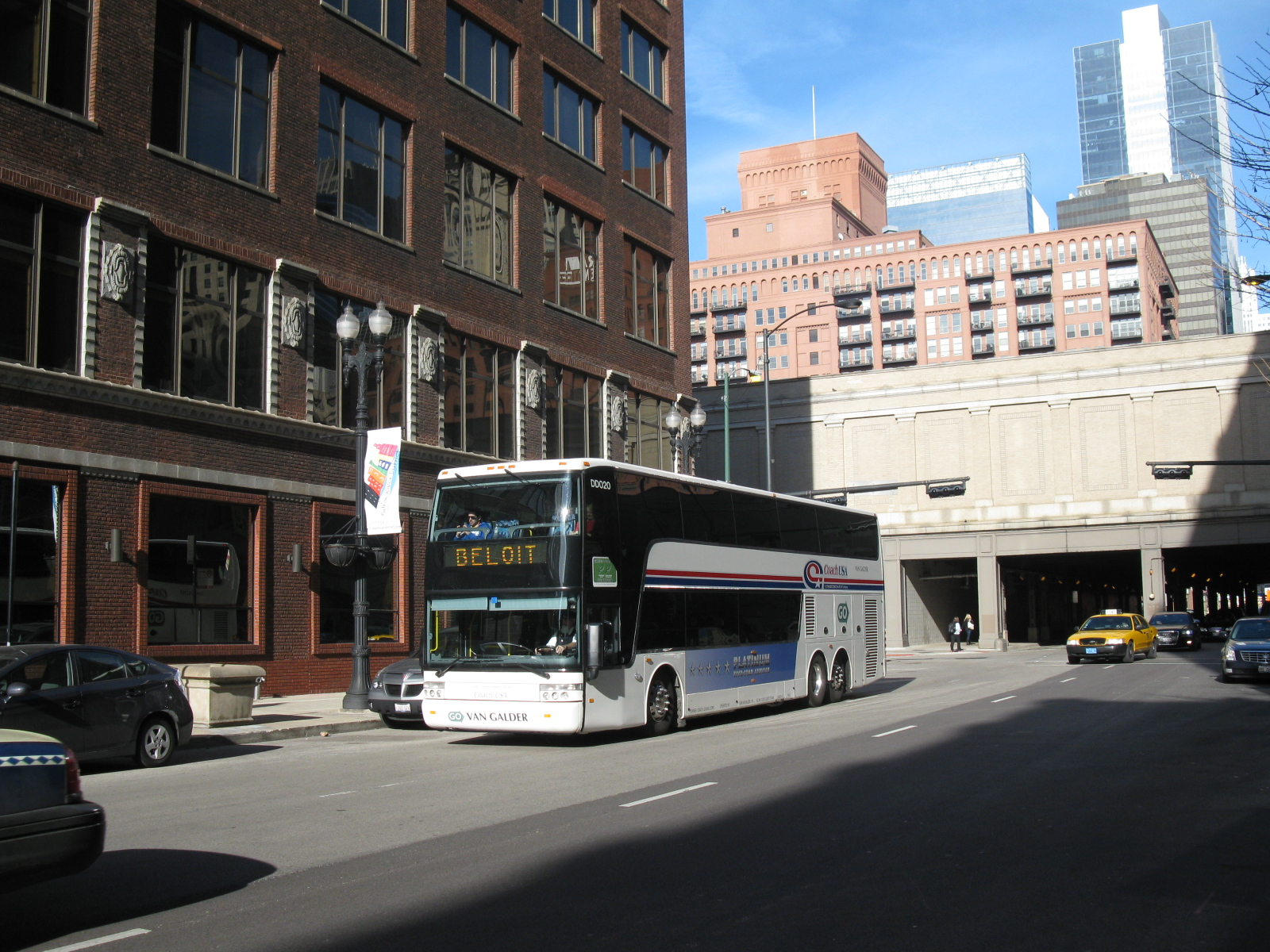
- Van Galder motorcoach in downtown Chicago
- Parent: Coach USA
- Founded: 1947
- Headquarters: 715 South Pearl Street
- Locale: Janesville, Wisconsin
- Destinations: Madison and Janesville, Wisconsin, South Beloit and Rockford, Illinois to Chicago (O'Hare, Union Station)
- Fleet: 150
- Operator: Sam Van Galder Inc.
- Chief executive: Allen Fugate
- Website: www.coachusa.com/airport-transportation/van-galder

Van Galder Bus Company, legally Sam Van Galder, Inc. is a regional bus service headquartered in Janesville, Wisconsin. A subsidiary of Coach USA, the company had been a family-owned business for over 50 years until it was sold in 1999 to the Stagecoach Group. Stephen Van Galder remained president under the Coach USA banner. In 2004, Van Galder acquired Rockford Coach Lines, which provided airport service from Rockford to O'Hare, from Greyhound Lines. Coach USA has been owned by Renco Group since 2024.

The company operates school buses for the Janesville School district, coach and school bus charters, tour and travel excursions, daily airport shuttles, Amtrak Thruway service to downtown Chicago, and the only intercity service on the I-39/90 corridor. The company has bus terminals in Janesville and Rockford. It picks up curbside in Madison on North Lake Street and at the Dutch Mill Park and Ride, and has a terminal in Rockford on Walton Street. Service to Chicago Midway Airport was suspended on March 17, 2020, and there are no plans to reinstate it.

In September 2009, the company started double-decker bus service on the route between Madison and downtown Chicago.

== Route ==
As of August 2025, Van Galder operates regularly scheduled service between University of Wisconsin–Madison and Chicago Union Station in different patterns serving the following stops:

State/Province	Town/City	Station	Connections
Wisconsin	Madison	North Lake Street near University of Wisconsin-Madison	Metro Transit, Greyhound, Jefferson Lines
Wisconsin	Madison	Dutch Mill Park & Ride off the West Beltline Highway and Stoughton Road (Highway 51)	Metro Transit, Greyhound, Jefferson Lines
Wisconsin	Janesville	Janesville Terminal off I-39/90 and Highway 14	Janesville Transit System, Wisconsin Coach Lines
Illinois	South Beloit	FasMart/McDonald's on southeast corner of I-39/90 and Highway 75	Beloit Transit
Illinois	Rockford	Rockford Terminal off State Street (U.S. Route 20 Business)	
Illinois	Chicago	O'Hare International Airport - Eastbound buses stop outside of Terminals 1, 2, 3, and 5, and westbound buses stop at the Multi-Modal Facility (MMF)	Airport Transit System, Pace, CTA Blue Line (at Terminals 1/2/3), Metra NCS Line (at MMF), Peoria Charter Coach Company (at MMF)
Illinois	Chicago	Chicago Union Station	Amtrak, Metra, CTA buses, Chicago "L", Greyhound, Pace

== See also ==
- Intercity buses in the United States
