= Sarku Japan =

American restaurant chain with Japanese cuisine

- A Sarku Japan location in West Town Mall, Knoxville, Tennessee
- Type: Private
- Industry: Quick Service Restaurant
- Genre: Japanese cuisine
- Founded: 1987; 39 years ago Boston, Massachusetts, U.S.
- Founders: James Chim, Daniel Chim, Richard Ko, Alex Pang
- Headquarters: 7650 Birchmount Road, Markham, Ontario, Canada
- Number of locations: 181 (September 1, 2021)
- Area served: United States; Colombia
- Products: Teppanyaki and sushi
- Website: www.sarkujapan.com

Sarku Japan is an American-Canadian quick serve restaurant chain focusing on Japanese cuisine. Founded in 1987, the chain has grown to include over 180 locations in 32 states across the country, as of September 2021.

The vast majority of the chain's restaurants are located in shopping mall food courts; however, a number of street locations can be found in Georgia, Maryland, New Jersey, New York and Virginia.

Sarku Japan's menu is composed predominantly of teriyaki dishes (chicken, beef and shrimp), though it also offers bento boxes, dumplings, tempura and a variety of sushi rolls.

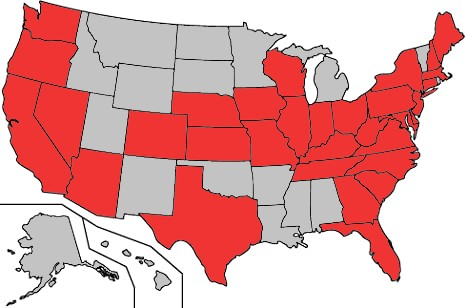
Map showing US states with Sarku Japan locations as of September 2021. States with at least one location are indicated in red.

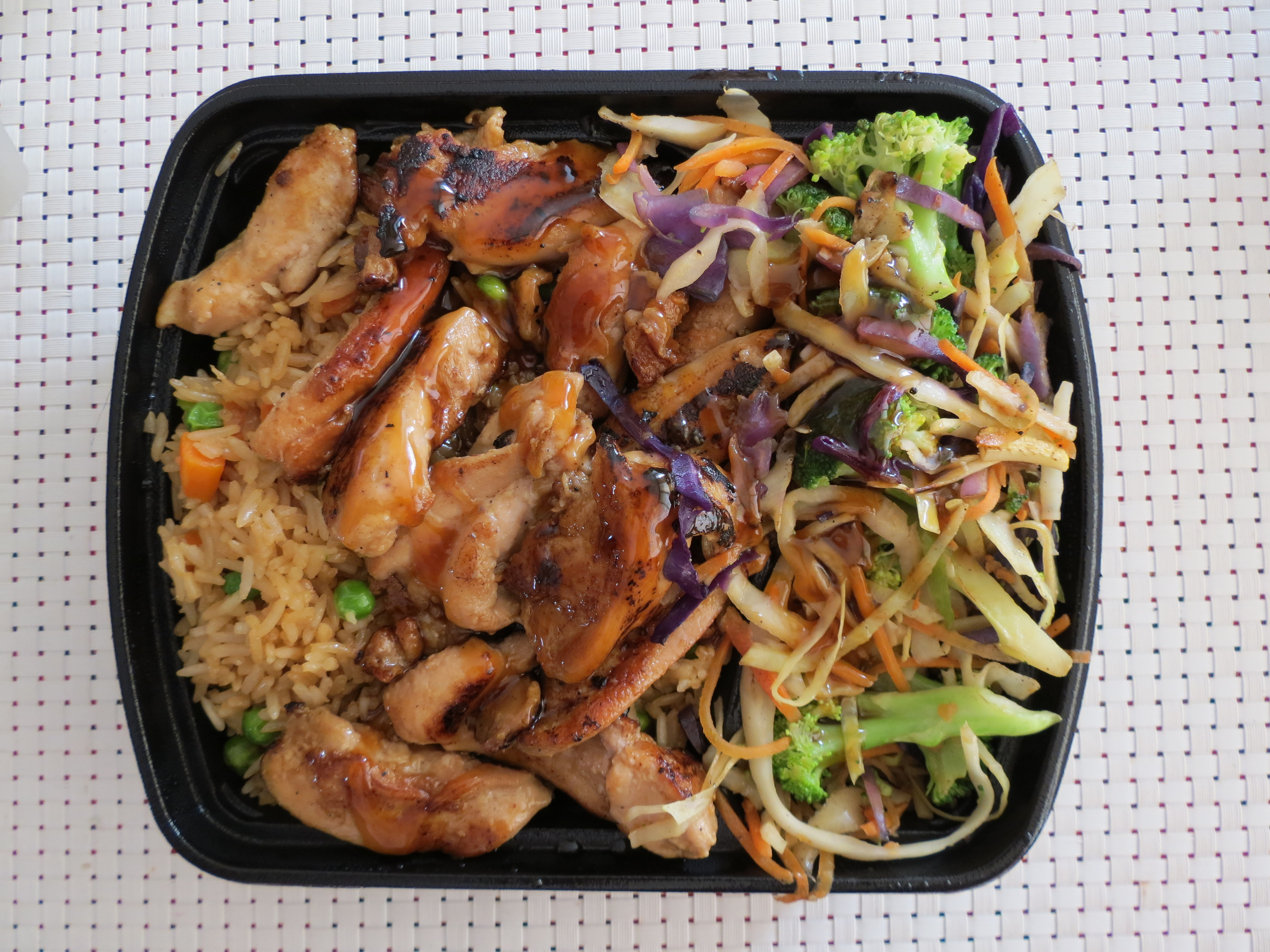
Teriyaki chicken dish served by one of the chain's stores in Medellín

== History ==
=== 1980s–1990s ===
The founders of Sarku Japan are James Chim, Daniel Chim, Richard Ko, and Alex Pang. They opened their first location in Boston, Massachusetts, in 1987. All four businessmen had met during their time at Manchu Wok, a Canadian quick-serve restaurant chain. They came together inspired to start their own venture ~ a quick-serve Japanese teppanyaki-style cooking concept.

With each founder's strengths in different areas, the restaurant proved to be a success and by 1991 had grown to a chain of over 25 stores in eight states, including as far away as Colorado and Texas.

By 1992, the next year, it had doubled in size to more than 50 restaurants across the Eastern Seaboard and Midwest.

Sarku Japan opened its 100th location in 1999 accompanying an expansion to the West Coast.

=== 2000s–2010s ===
A Sarku Japan restaurant

In April 2002, the company moved its headquarters to its present location in Markham, Ontario.

In the late 2000s and early 2010s, the company embarked on a substantial expansion campaign. These efforts included opening new "Teriyaki and Sushi Express" concept stores intended to be street-front rather than in mall food courts, as well as the signing of a contract with Frisby Corp to open 20+ new locations in Colombia over the following decade.

The first of the Colombian stores opened in Pereira, Medellín and Cali in October 2011, followed by five more in Medellín, Cali and Bogotá by the end of the year.

The company also looked to expand to Vietnam, Asia, Europe and the Middle East, however there is no indication that these ventures were ever undertaken. At the time, the company was forecasting the chain would reach 1,000 locations by the end of the decade.

=== 2020s ===
In March 2020, as part of the COVID-19 pandemic, the chain was forced to temporarily close nearly all of its locations. This extended closure led to the company's 2020 yearly sales declining 46% from the year prior, and left the chain in precarious financial standing.

Despite loosened COVID-19 restrictions, the chain reported that by January 2021 only 184 of 226 locations had reopened. On January 26, 2021, Sarku Japan entered creditor protection under the Companies' Creditors Arrangement Act in Canada and Chapter 15 bankruptcy in the US. As of September 2021, it appears many of these locations are still closed or may have permanently shuttered.

The company currently lists operating 181 stores in 32 states.

== Associated restaurants ==
=== Kato's Cajun ===
Sarku Japan owns and operates the Cajun-Chinese quick-serve restaurant chain Kato's Cajun. As of September 2021, only one location of Kato's Cajun is open, located in East Towne Mall in Madison, Wisconsin. It is unclear how many restaurants existed at its peak however listings can be found for former locations at West Towne Mall in Madison, Market Place Shopping Center in Champaign, Illinois, Arbor Place in Douglasville, Georgia, and The Shops at Liberty Place in Philadelphia, Pennsylvania.

=== Ming Tree ===
Sarku Japan also owns and operates the Chinese quick-serve restaurant chain Ming Tree. It appears as of September 2021 that the Ming Tree chain is defunct, as no location listings can be found. Listings can be found for closed locations at Dover Mall in Dover, Delaware, Security Square Mall in Baltimore, Maryland and Independence Mall in Wilmington, North Carolina.

== See also ==
- Manchu Wok
- Panda Express
