= Madison Metro =

Madison Metro may refer to:

- Madison metropolitan area, the metropolitan area surrounding the city of Madison, Wisconsin
- Metro Transit (Madison), formerly Madison Metro, public transit system in Madison, Wisconsin
