= Dane County Regional Airport =

Airport in Madison, Wisconsin

Dane County Regional Airport Truax Field

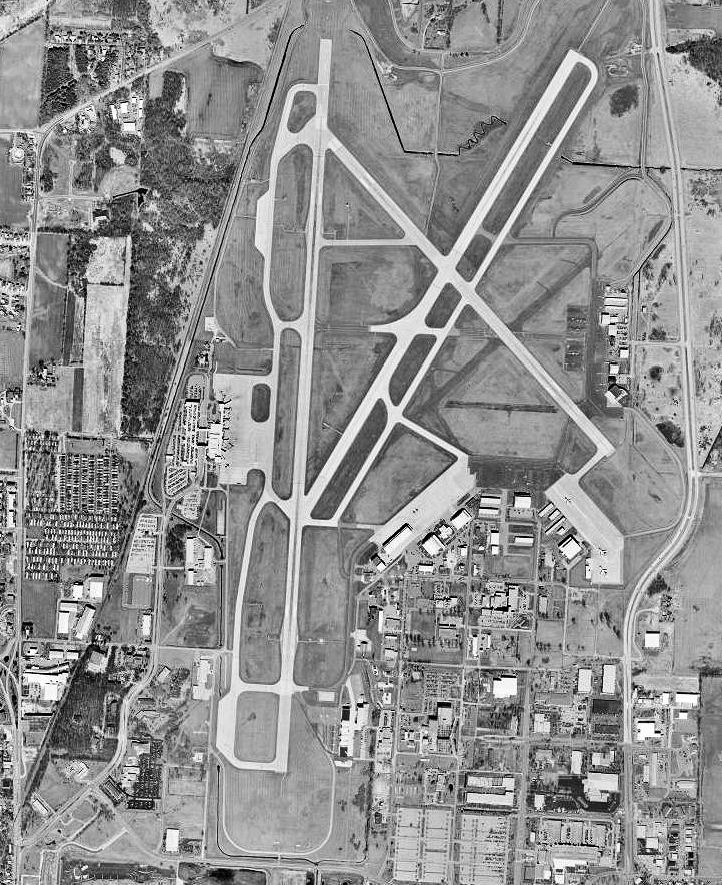
- IATA: MSN; ICAO: KMSN; FAA LID: MSN

Summary
- Airport type: Public
- Owner/Operator: Dane County
- Serves: Madison, Wisconsin
- Opened: September 1937
- Time zone: CST (UTC−06:00)
  - Summer (DST): CDT (UTC−05:00)
- Elevation AMSL: 887 ft (270 m)
- Coordinates: 43°08′24″N 089°20′15″W
- Public transit access: Metro Transit
- Website: msnairport.com

Maps
- 2019 FAA airport diagram

- Location of airport in Wisconsin MSN (the United States)
- Interactive map of Dane County Regional Airport

Runways
Direction	Length		Surface
Direction	ft	m	Surface
18/36	9,006	2,745	Concrete
3/21	7,200	2,195	Concrete
14/32	5,846	1,782	Concrete

Statistics (12 months ending August 2026 ^{except where noted})
- Passenger volume: 2,552,000
- Departing passengers: 1,283,000
- Scheduled flights: 17,511
- Cargo (lb.): 25 mil
- Aircraft operations (2022): 76,218
- Based aircraft (2024): 163
- Sources: airport website, FAA, BTS

Dane County Regional Airport (DCRA) (IATA: MSN, ICAO: KMSN, FAA LID: MSN), also known as Truax Field, is a civil-military airport located 6 nautical miles (11 km; 6.9 mi) northeast of downtown Madison, Wisconsin. In the Federal Aviation Administration (FAA) National Plan of Integrated Airport Systems for 2025–2029, it is one of two airports in Wisconsin that is categorized as a small-hub primary commercial service facility; the other is Appleton International Airport. It is the second busiest of eight commercial airports in Wisconsin in terms of passengers served after Milwaukee Mitchell International Airport.

== History ==
In 1927, the City of Madison purchased 290 acres of land for $35,380. Previously a cabbage patch for a nearby sauerkraut factory, the newly acquired land would later become the present-day home of the Dane County Regional Airport. In January 1936, the city council voted to accept a Works Progress Administration grant for the construction of four runways and an airplane hangar. Additional grants financed the terminal and administrative building as well as electric floodlights. The development price tag was $1 million – 10% paid by the city and the remainder by the federal government. In September 1938, Barnstormer Howard Morey of Chicago; Edgar Quinn; and J.J. McMannamy organized the Madison Airways Corporation.

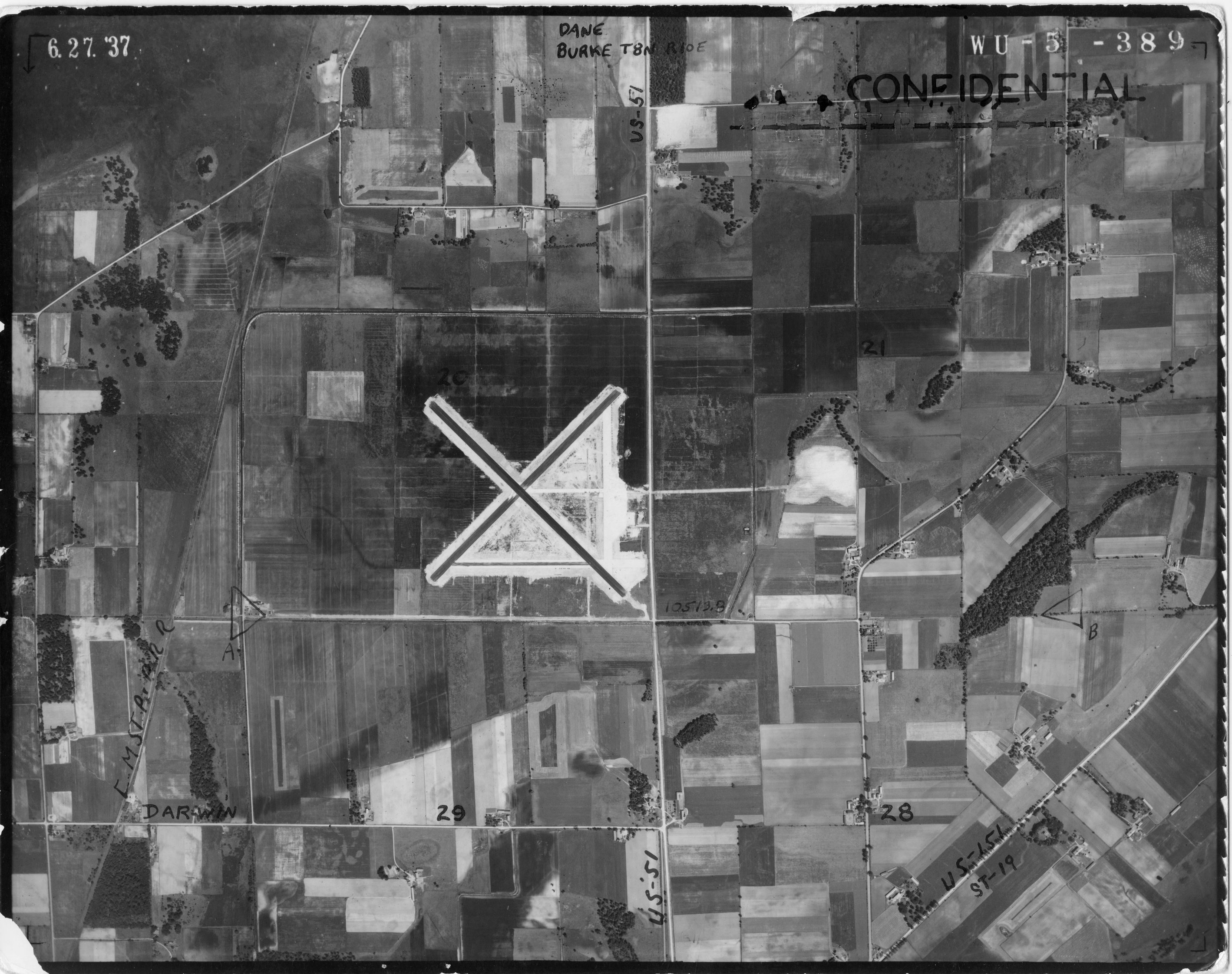
The airport during construction, June 1937

The airport was renamed Truax Field and activated as a U.S. Army Air Corps airfield in June 1942 during World War II. It was named for Madison native, Lt. Thomas "Bud" Truax, who died while training at the base in November 1941. The base's activation brought an influx of service members and their families to Dane County, and their pocketbooks helped to boon the community's wartime economy.

During World War II, the field was used by the Army Air Corps Eastern Technical Training Center, a major school operating at Truax AAF for training radio operators and mechanics. The airport later expanded to training in radar operations, control tower operations, and other communications fields for the Army Airways Communication Service. A unit established in 1943 trained radio operators and mechanics on B-29 Superfortress communications equipment. The host unit on the airfield was the 334th (later 3508th) Army Air Corps Base Unit. On September 17, 1945, the airfield's mission was changed to that of a separation center and it was closed as an active AAF airfield on November 30, 1945.

Conveyed to local civil authorities, the Madison Municipal Airport became the home to the 1st Battalion 147th Aviation Regiment. The 1-147th operates the UH-60M Blackhawk Helicopter and has deployed in support of Operation Enduring Freedom. The airport is also home to the Wisconsin Air National Guard and its present-day 115th Fighter Wing (115 FW), an Air National Guard fighter wing operationally gained by the Air Combat Command (ACC). Today, the Air National Guard's Lockheed Martin F-35 Lightning II operates at the base. The 115th Fighter Wing is one of the 14 operational air defense units responsible for air defense of the eastern continental United States.

On December 15, 1966, a 31,000 square foot terminal building opened on the west side of the airfield at a cost of $2.36 million. The first scheduled jets were Northwest Orient 727s in 1965. In 1986, the airport tripled in size with a $12 million project that expanded the terminal from 32,000 square feet to 90,000 square feet, adding a second-level concourse with six boarding bridges.

In 2006, the airport completed a $68 million expansion that doubled the size of the terminal, built in a Frank Lloyd Wright-influenced prairie style designed by the Architectural Alliance based in Minneapolis. The new terminal accommodates 13 gates with jetways, WiFi, additional restaurant and retail vendors post-security, an art court, and both business and family lounges. The airport has also continued to expand its parking options, most recently in 2014.

On February 7, 2018, the airport announced a significant terminal modernization program, including replacement of existing jet bridges and design work beginning in 2018 as well as major construction including additional jet boarding bridges beginning in 2019. The county is also planning to add an 8 MW solar energy site on airport-owned land.

In 2021, the airport began construction on an $85 million expansion of the terminal dubbed the South Terminal expansion. This project adds three additional gates that can accommodate larger aircraft. The new terminal contains two stories with 45,000 square feet of public space. The first floor consists of 45,000 square feet of maintenance workshops and infrastructure. The concourse floor above includes the new gates, a restaurant, a play area for children, a nursing suite for mothers and a service animal relief area. The south terminal expansion was completed, and formally opened, in June 2023. As part of this expansion, three new gates were added to the airport. In addition to this expansion, development has begun on three additional gates.

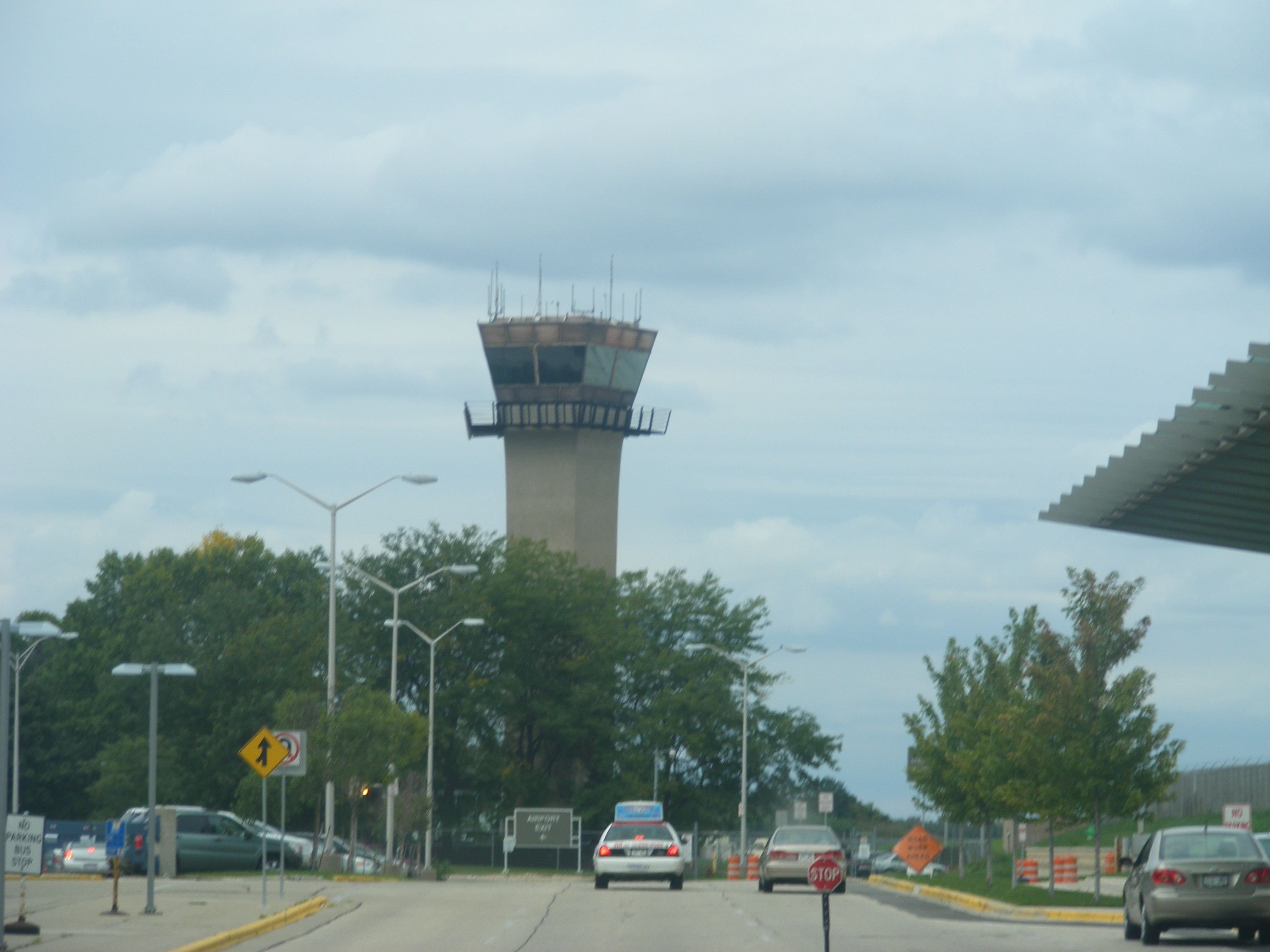
Control tower

In February 2025, DCRA announced that it would formally apply for an international airport designation from the U.S. Treasury Department. The designation would allow passengers to fly directly to and from international destinations and satisfy customs requirements.

== Facilities ==
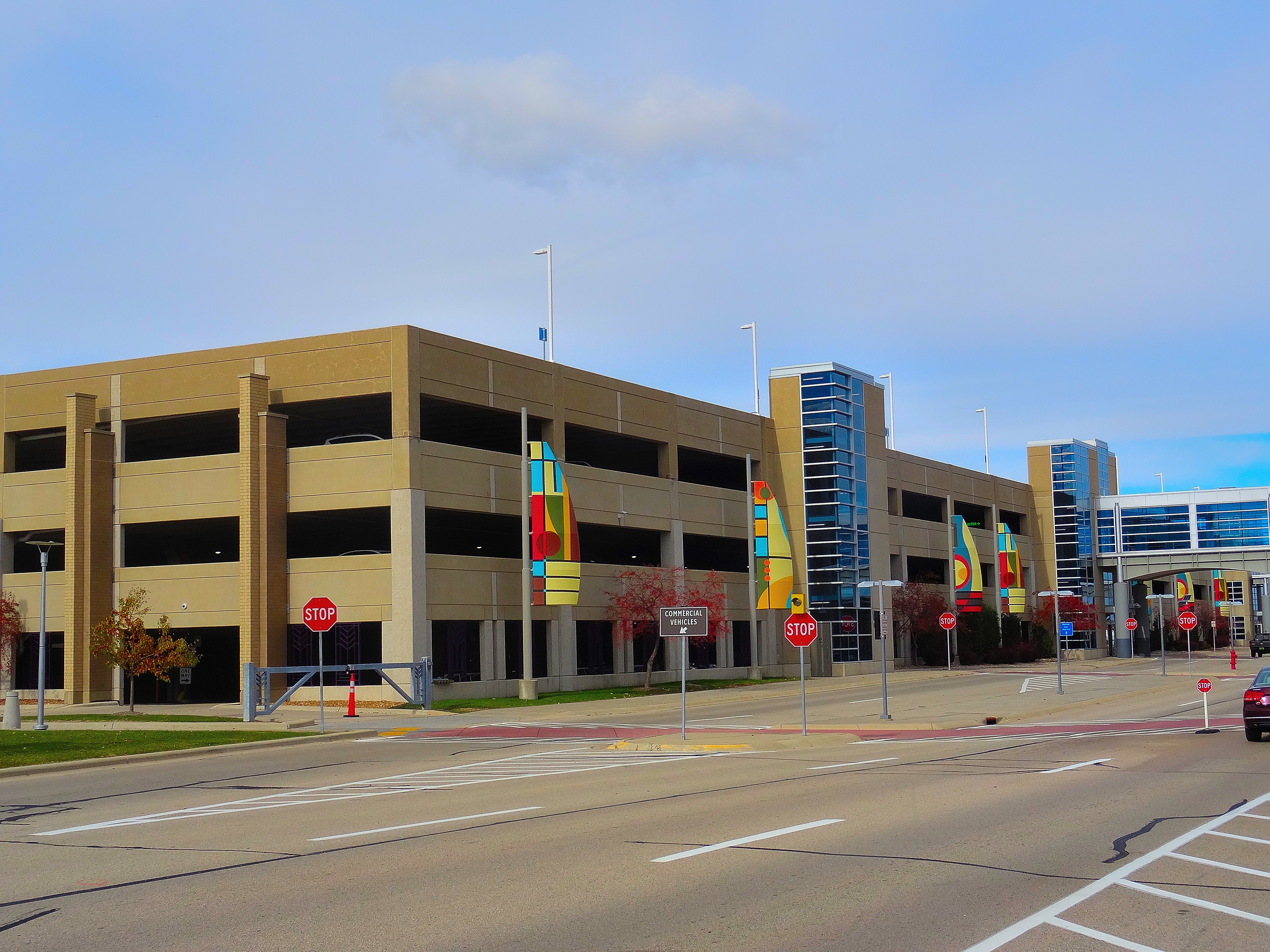
Parking garage

=== Runways ===
Dane County Regional Airport covers 3,500 acres (1,416 ha) with a field elevation of 886.6 feet (270.2 m) above mean sea level. It has three concrete runways: the primary runway 18/36 is 9,006 by 150 feet (2,745 x 46 m); 3/21 is 7,200 by 150 feet (2,195 x 46 m); 14/32 is 5,846 by 150 feet (1,782 x 46 m).

The fixed-base operator (FBO) is Wisconsin Aviation, which leased the assets of the former FBO, Four Lakes Aviation and Coldstream Aviation, in 1994.

In August 2024, there were 163 aircraft based at this airport: 92 single-engine, 7 multi-engine, 28 jet, 1 helicopter and 35 various military aircraft.

=== Terminal ===
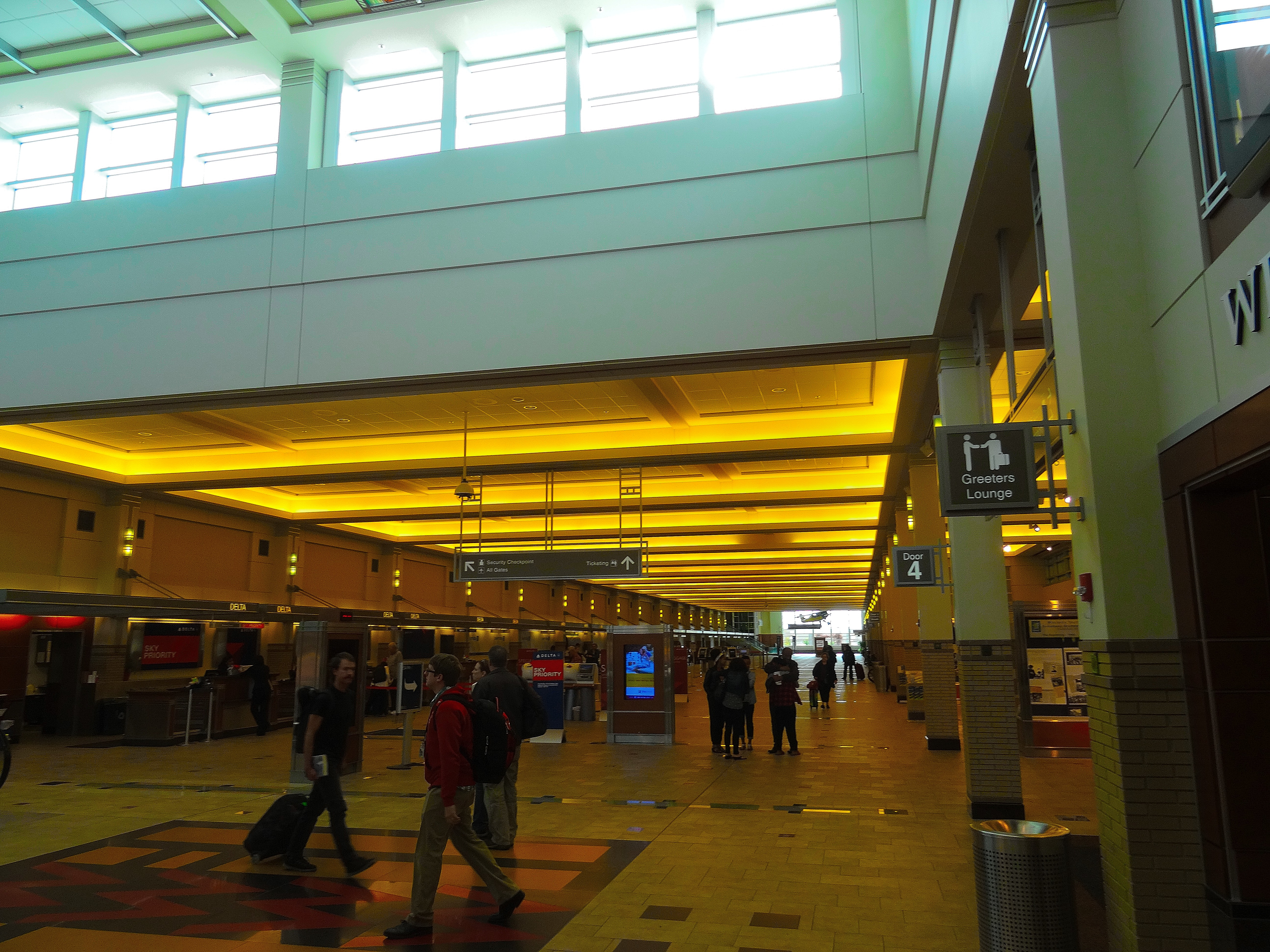
Panorama of terminal at Dane County Regional Airport, 2015

The terminal currently has 16 gates on one concourse.

Pre-security amenities include a coffee shop and gift shop. The post-security side of the terminal includes two restaurants, a coffee shop, and three travel markets. The South Terminal expansion added an additional restaurant, a lactation room and a new post-security pet relief area.

=== Ground transportation ===
Taxi service and transportation network company drivers (e.g. Uber and Lyft) are available outside the terminal. Rental car counters are located across from the baggage claim area. Many local hotels provide courtesy shuttle service to and from the airport.

Metro Transit serves the airport via Route D2 which offers direct service every 30 minutes to Downtown Madison including, the Capitol Square, State Street, the UW Campus and other points west.

Both short and long-term parking are available in a large parking structure and in several adjacent lots.

== Airlines and destinations ==
=== Passenger ===
Airlines	Destinations	Refs
American Airlines	Charlotte, Dallas/Fort Worth, Phoenix–Sky Harbor	
American Eagle	Boston, Charlotte, Chicago–O'Hare, New York–LaGuardia, Philadelphia, Washington–National; Seasonal: Miami	
Breeze Airways	Fort Myers, Tampa; Seasonal: Los Angeles, Orlando, Raleigh/Durham	
Delta Air Lines	Atlanta, Detroit, Minneapolis/St. Paul	
Delta Connection	Boston, Detroit, Minneapolis/St. Paul, New York–LaGuardia, Washington–National	
Sun Country Airlines	Seasonal: Fort Myers, Phoenix–Sky Harbor	
United Airlines	Chicago–O'Hare, Denver	
United Express	Chicago–O'Hare, Newark; Seasonal: Denver	

== Statistics ==
=== Airline market share ===
Largest airlines at MSN (September 2025 – August 2026)
Rank	Airline	Passengers	Share
1	American	516,000	20.21%
2	United	461,000	18.05%
3	Delta	354,000	13.88%
4	SkyWest	316,000	12.37%
5	Republic	249,000	9.76%
—	Other	657,000	25.73%

=== Top destinations ===
Busiest domestic routes from MSN (September 2025 – August 2026)
Rank	Airport	Passengers	Carriers
1	Chicago–O'Hare, Illinois	286,210	American, United
2	Denver, Colorado	148,250	Frontier, United
3	Dallas/Fort Worth, Texas	123,120	American
4	Minneapolis/St. Paul, Minnesota	121,490	Delta
5	Atlanta, Georgia	100,120	Delta
6	Charlotte, North Carolina	95,080	American
7	Detroit, Michigan	89,230	Delta
8	Phoenix, Arizona	79,000	American, Sun Country
9	Washington–National, D.C.	56,570	American, Delta
10	New York–LaGuardia, New York	54,270	American, Delta

== Accidents and incidents ==
- On November 23, 1978, a hijacker crashed through a vehicle gate, drove to a North Central Airlines McDonnell Douglas DC-9, and boarded the aircraft. There were 23 passengers and crew on board. After the hijacker claimed to have a bomb in a trash bag, the passengers deplaned and the crew escaped. The hijacker then locked himself in the cockpit and threatened to burn the plane. Police then boarded, broke into the cockpit and the hijacker arrested. No explosives were found. Charges were dismissed because of mental incompetence.

== See also ==
- List of airports in Wisconsin
- Metro Transit (Madison)
