= Monona Express =

Former transit service in Monona, Wisconsin

- Defunct: 2025
- Headquarters: 5211 Schluter Road
- Locale: Monona, Wisconsin
- Service area: Dane County, Wisconsin
- Service type: Bus service
- Routes: 2
- Website: Monona Express

Monona Express was a provider of public transportation with commuter bus service between Monona and Madison, Wisconsin. Following a decline in ridership seen after the COVID-19 pandemic, the city started studying whether to discontinue the service in favor of switching to Madison Metro Transit. In December 2023 the Monona city council elected to join the Metro Transit network and wind down the Monona Express service. Monona is now served by Metro route 38 along with stops on the "G" and "L" routes which travel on Monona Dr. This new service began on March 3, 2025.

== Service ==
Monona Express operated two weekday commuter bus routes between Monona and Madison. Each route had four roundtrips oriented towards commuters and students headed to the State Capitol in downtown Madison and University of Wisconsin. Hours of operation for the system were Monday through Friday from 5:50 A.M. to 6:47 P.M. There was no service on Saturdays and Sundays. Regular fares were $3.00.

=== Routes ===
- Morning Route
- Afternoon Route

== See also ==
- List of bus transit systems in the United States
- Metro Transit (Madison)
