= South Beloit, Illinois =

- City
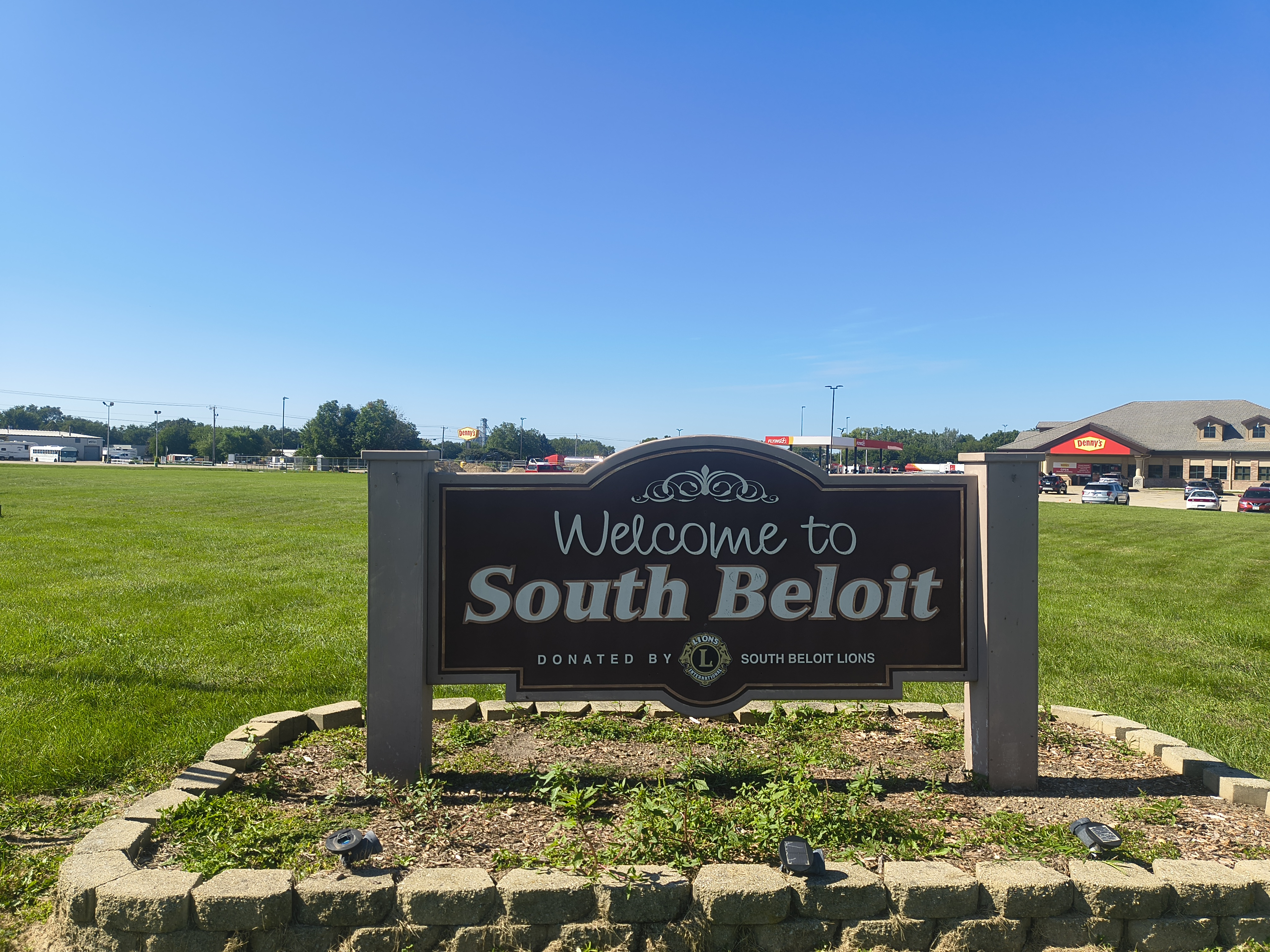
- Welcome Sign on I-39

- Location of South Beloit in Winnebago County, Illinois
- Coordinates: 42°28′52″N 89°00′34″W
- Country: United States
- State: Illinois
- County: Winnebago

Area
  - Total: 6.39 sq mi (16.55 km^{2})
  - Land: 6.14 sq mi (15.91 km^{2})
  - Water: 0.25 sq mi (0.64 km^{2})
- Elevation: 738 ft (225 m)

Population (2020)
  - Total: 7,989
  - Density: 1,300.3/sq mi (502.04/km^{2})
- Time zone: UTC-6 (CST)
  - Summer (DST): UTC-5 (CDT)
- ZIP code: 61080
- Area codes: 815, 779
- FIPS code: 17-70590
- GNIS feature ID: 2395912
- Website: https://www.southbeloit.org/

South Beloit is a city in Winnebago County, Illinois, United States. It is a suburban extension of Beloit, Wisconsin, located along the Illinois–Wisconsin border within the Rockford metropolitan area. The population was 7,989 at the 2020 census.

== History ==
=== Early history ===
What is now South Beloit was previously full of natural resources such as copper, lead, and bog iron. Buff and blue limestones were plentiful everywhere in Winnebago County, with limestone forming the banks of the Rock River and Turtle Creek. The buff limestone gave the first settlers material for their houses and public buildings, some of which can still be seen in Rockford, Rockton, and Beloit/South Beloit. The older homes in South Beloit had 18–20-inch-thick (46–51 cm) basement walls of this limestone. The South Beloit area has a thick deposit of sand, and industries were built here because of its unusually fine quality. A fine quality of clay was also found in the state line area.

Many people have inhabited South Beloit over the years, including the Mound Builders, Sioux, and Illinswek (Illinois). The Turtle Indians of the area were the Winnebago Tribe, Siouan family. They had villages all along the Rock River and Turtle Creek. One large village was in modern-day South Beloit and all the way up to northeast Beloit. It was named for an important chief, Kau Rau Maw Nee (Walking Turtle). Turtle later became modern day Beloit and South Beloit.

=== Beloit divided ===
In 1818, Congress told the people of the Illinois Territory to draft a constitution and adopt a state government. A heated debate arose over the correct placement of the northern state line of Illinois. Most people in the lead region around Galena and the northern part of the territory did not want to be part of the proposed state because of a large debt and tax for internal improvements. The northern part was against slavery (still practiced in the southern part) and wanted a Lake Michigan shoreline. If the old line of 1787 were kept, Illinois would be much smaller than Wisconsin, placing Chicago in Wisconsin and leaving Illinois with no Lake Michigan shoreline. Getting exasperated with the debate, Nathaniel Pope, who represented Illinois, went ahead and proposed the bill to Congress cutting 8,500 square miles off of Wisconsin and adding it to Illinois. Thus the current state line was created.

=== Founding and developtment ===
Illinois had become a state in 1818, Winnebago County was organized in January 1836, and public surveys started in the fall of 1836. Government sale of lands started in 1837–39, but Rockton Township sale was held until 1843 because of claims made by Polish exiles in 1843 for land previously held by early settlers in and around Rockton and Rockford. Their claims were discounted and the land was put up for sale when the land commission declared the Polish Count had not fulfilled the terms of the agreement. He was to have the choice of three adjacent townships and live on the land, making improvements for ten years. The Polish had chosen Townships 44 and 46, Range 1, East, and not 45 and had not settled on the land. The early settlers held the land by squatters' rights and were now able to buy their farms from the government for $1.25 an acre.

This was also the time when Winnebago County tried to secede from Illinois and attach itself to Wisconsin. The people living there disapproved of the $14,000,000 debt for internal improvements with an empty treasury and insufficient revenue. The southern part of the state was poor and unprogressive, in contrast to the industrious north. Winnebago County voted in 1842 for annexation to Wisconsin. 972 voted for it, and only 6 voted against it. However, the south had more people and out-voted the north. So Winnebago County remained in Illinois.

By 1838, the village of Turtle had grown large enough to resent the Indian name it had used for so long. They also rejected the suggestion of 'New Albany'. A committee (or possibly two committees) was chosen to propose a new name. The French word for nice or pretty is 'bellotte'. The committee members, remembering a happy time in Detroit, sounded the word for pretty and came up with Balloit, then Beloit. The name was approved, reported to the settlement, and accepted. South Beloit became the south part of Beloit.

By the early 1900s, the city was thriving according to the standards if the time. With 1200 people living there, it petitioned other governments to become a city in 1914. The petition was approved, and in May 1917, a special election was held to file for incorporation. The election passed and South Beloit became a city on September 17, 1917. The initial city did not include a certain portion to the West side of the city, which joined the city on May 2, 1921.

=== Police and fire departments ===
The police department was established as one of the first departments by ordinance No.13, October 1917. It started off as a one-man, part-time enforcement. The first squad car was purchased from Saris Auto Company in 1923 for $431.71. In October 1928, the department bought a motorcycle from the Beloit Police for $100. In April 1957, the department became radio operated by the purchase of a Motorola Police Base Station for $587.

In February 1927, there was a bond issue to remodel City Hall, which included the establishment of a fire department and purchase of fire equipment. The first group of volunteers met in fall, 1927 and, with the help of Beloit firemen, learned how to use the equipment and effectively fight fires. The fire truck, a W.S. Knott, was manufactured in Minneapolis and delivered in February 1928 by Clare Hillman, who was familiar with its operation and became the first fire chief. The first uniformed department was made up of twelve members, plus Chief Hillman. These early volunteers were Edward Brady, George Graves, George Holtz, Arthur Schultz, David Bliss, James Howard, John Jensen, Thomas Flanigan, Robert Smith, Everett Clussman, Erwin Earl, and Fay Hanson.

=== School history ===
In 1859 a group of settlers living on the east side of the city purchased a piece of land from Dr. E.N.Clark for $125. The school house, costing $621, was built on that property. The district at the time of the purchase was District No.11, Town of Rockton, Winnebago County, and was called Clark School after Dr. Clark.

Another South Beloit school was Butler School, started at least by 1877 and probably around 1859, on the other side of the river. Three of the early teachers at Butler were Maud Whetstone, Kitty Aspland, and William Gharrity. At Clark the first teacher was Lewis Bixby who got $26 a month for five winter months and had to pay his own board. Miss Jennie Kimball taught the following summer for $4 a week. The enrollment at Clark was from six to twenty pupils in the early years. During the Civil War, the school year was reduced.

== Geography ==
According to the 2010 census, South Beloit has a total area of 6.13 square miles (15.88 km^{2}), of which 5.9 square miles (15.28 km^{2}) (or 96.25%) is land and 0.23 square miles (0.60 km^{2}) (or 3.75%) is water.

== Demographics ==
Historical population
Census	Pop.	Note	%±
1920	1,436		—
1930	2,361		64.4%
1940	2,825		19.7%
1950	3,221		14.0%
1960	3,781		17.4%
1970	3,804		0.6%
1980	4,088		7.5%
1990	4,072		−0.4%
2000	5,397		32.5%
2010	7,892		46.2%
2020	7,989		1.2%
U.S. Decennial Census

=== 2020 census ===
As of the 2020 census, South Beloit had a population of 7,989. The median age was 36.3 years. 26.4% of residents were under the age of 18 and 13.3% of residents were 65 years of age or older. For every 100 females there were 94.9 males, and for every 100 females age 18 and over there were 93.5 males age 18 and over.

98.0% of residents lived in urban areas, while 2.0% lived in rural areas.

There were 3,070 households in South Beloit, of which 37.0% had children under the age of 18 living in them. Of all households, 45.4% were married-couple households, 18.7% were households with a male householder and no spouse or partner present, and 26.1% were households with a female householder and no spouse or partner present. About 26.6% of all households were made up of individuals and 10.0% had someone living alone who was 65 years of age or older.

There were 3,304 housing units, of which 7.1% were vacant. The homeowner vacancy rate was 1.9% and the rental vacancy rate was 8.3%.

Racial composition as of the 2020 census
Race	Number	Percent
White	6,223	77.9%
Black or African American	350	4.4%
American Indian and Alaska Native	48	0.6%
Asian	142	1.8%
Native Hawaiian and Other Pacific Islander	1	0.0%
Some other race	408	5.1%
Two or more races	817	10.2%
Hispanic or Latino (of any race)	918	11.5%

=== 2000 census ===
As of the census of 2000, there were 8,051 people, 3,400 households, and 1,678 families residing in the city. The population density was 1,362.9 inhabitants per square mile (526.2/km^{2}). There were 2,345 housing units at an average density of 592.2 per square mile (228.6/km^{2}). The racial makeup of the city was 87.16% White, 5% African American, 0.63% Native American, 1.01% Asian, 0.07% Pacific Islander, 3.48% from other races, and 1.83% from two or more races. Hispanic or Latino of any race were 7.49% of the population.

There were 2,165 households, out of which 33.8% had children under the age of 18 living with them, 49.1% were married couples living together, 11.4% had a female householder with no husband present, and 34.5% were non-families. 28.8% of all households were made up of individuals, and 10.3% had someone living alone who was 65 years of age or older. The average household size was 2.46 and the average family size was 3.01.

In the city, the population was spread out, with 26.5% under the age of 18, 8.7% from 18 to 24, 33.4% from 25 to 44, 18.5% from 45 to 64, and 12.9% who were 65 years of age or older. The median age was 33 years. For every 100 females, there were 98.1 males. For every 100 females age 18 and over, there were 96.2 males.

The median income for a household in the city was $35,597, and the median income for a family was $41,154. Males had a median income of $33,110 versus $22,596 for females. The per capita income for the city was $18,363. About 8.2% of families and 10.0% of the population were below the poverty line, including 15.4% of those under age 18 and 7.6% of those age 65 or over.

== Economy ==
South Beloit's economy has benefited from the legalization of cannabis in Illinois due to its location on the Illinois-Wisconsin state line, as cannabis remains illegal in Wisconsin. The city has received a significant amount of tax revenue since the opening of the town's first recreational cannabis dispensary in 2020. The city's economy is only expected to further benefit from this industry as a second dispensary was opened along the state line in January 2025.

== Education ==
Much of South Beloit is in the South Beloit Community Unit School District 320, a PK-12 school district. A portion to the east is in the Prairie Hill Community Consolidated School District 133 while a portion to the southwest is in the Rockton School District 140. The Prairie Hill and Rockton areas are both in the Hononegah Community High School District 207.

== Transportation ==
Local bus service in the city is provided by Beloit Transit as well as Stateline Mass Transit District. Van Galder Bus Company provides intercity bus service to Chicago, Madison and points in between. South Beloit was served by the Milwaukee Road with lines running between Davis Junction and Janesville and Racine and Kittredge.
