= West Towne Mall =

- Looking down the JCPenney wing, toward JCPenney.
- Location: Madison, Wisconsin, U.S.
- Coordinates: 43°03′26″N 89°30′21″W
- Address: 66 West Towne Mall, 53719-1019
- Opened: October 15, 1970, renovated 1989, 2003
- Developer: Jacobs, Visconsi, and Jacobs Co., Cleveland, Ohio
- Owner: CBL Properties
- Architect: Lou Resnick, Jacobs, Visconsi, and Jacobs Co.
- Num. of stores: 129
- Num. of anchor tenants: 6
- Floor area: 915,307 square feet (85,034.8 m^{2})
- Floors: 1 (2 in Dick's Sporting Goods and JCPenney)
- Parking: 7,870
- Public transit: Metro Transit
- Website: www.shopwesttowne-mall.com

West Towne Mall is a shopping mall located in Madison, Wisconsin, U.S., owned by CBL Properties. It was the first enclosed shopping center within 70 miles (110 km) of Madison, with its grand opening on October 15, 1970. The mall was designed by the architect Lou Resnick and developed by Jacobs, Visconsi, and Jacobs Co., of Cleveland, Ohio, the developer of Brookfield Square in Milwaukee. The 56,000-square-foot (5,200 m^{2}) Manchester's store was later replaced by a food court. West Towne is the sister mall to the East Towne Mall, which opened a year later.

== History ==
=== 1970s ===
The West Towne and its sister mall, East Towne, were originally developed by Jacobs, Visconsi, and Jacobs Company of Cleveland, Ohio, which was later known as the Richard E. Jacobs Group. Initial anchors were Prange's, Sears, J. C. Penney and Manchester's. The Manchester's location was their sixth and at the time their largest store. The store would eventually be replaced by a food court.

West Towne was built in a cow pasture on the west side of Madison in an area that was originally intended for industrial development. After the mall was built it became a massive retail area instead. Palm trees and other tropical plants were originally used in the mall area. The trees shipped from Florida were nearly killed by a cold snap when delays in the shipment of the glass for the main entryway forced emergency heaters into use. Half-inch-thick glass (13 mm) made by Pilkington in England was hung in curtain form with no visible support or connections and filled a 50-by-27-foot (15.2 m × 8.2 m) area at the main entrance. A helicopter was employed to place the 30 HVAC units on the building's roof to control the climate of the building.

West Towne's grand opening was on Thursday October 15, 1970, at 9:30 a.m. and had no ceremony or ribbon cutting to mark the occasion. The mall's manager James M. Roche explained the lack of a ceremony saying, "We feel the shopper has come out to see the center. Our "grand opening" will be symbolized by all stores opening their doors promptly at 9:30 a.m." Part of the opening included young women called "mall-ettes" handing out balloons, flowers and mall directories to shoppers. Only 28 stores were open at the time and two of the anchors Sears and J. C. Penney opened later.

Original logo of West Towne Mall.

Two artists were commissioned to provide artwork for the main mall area. Detroit sculptor Joseph A. McDonnell was commissioned to create five metal sculptures for the mall. McDonnell spent seven months completing the sculptures, four of which were motorized to rotate, as well as a large 15-by-15-foot (4.6 m × 4.6 m) chandelier-like work that hung near the east entrance. McDonnell was quoted as saying he was "astonished at the amount of money [the developers] wanted to spend on art" and noted at the time that he had only seen one other shopping center that spent more on artistic development. Clarence Van Duzer, a sculptor from Cleveland, Ohio, was commissioned to help design three of the four fountain areas as well as a suspended sculpture and water sculpture locater at the center of the mall. Part of the central fountain included a 19-foot-tall (5.8 m) metal piece with several nozzles that circulated 800 US gallons (3,000 L) of water per minute, forming part of the sculpture. He also created four magnesium sculptures that were suspended from the ceiling between the fountain and one of the sunken lounge areas. The fountains and sunken lounges were removed during a late-1980s remodeling of the mall.

=== 1980s ===
West Towne and East Towne malls were at the center of a mid-1980s Wisconsin Supreme Court case. In Jacobs v. Major, an anti-nuclear dance group, called the Nu Parable dancers, was barred from performing a dance which ended in a "die-in" on the mall's property. At issue was the right of non-consensual use of private property for freedom of speech purposes. In 1987, the Wisconsin Supreme court ruled 4–3 in favor of the mall owner's right to exclude Nu Parable from both malls.

=== 2000s ===
CBL Properties purchased West Towne Mall, West Towne Crossing as well as East Towne Mall from Richard E. Jacobs Group in late 2000 as part of a $1.2 billion deal that included 23 properties. The deal was completed February 1, 2001. West Towne Crossing is immediately west of West Towne Mall and includes a Best Buy, Kohl's, OfficeMax, Nordstrom Rack, Metcalfe's Market and Barnes & Noble. CBL refurbished both East Towne and West Towne, unveiling the changes, which included more skylights, family restrooms, improved interior decor, seating, flooring and other changes in November 2003. The face lift to West Towne Mall cost $2.8 million and was the first significant change to the mall since the 1989 addition of a fourth anchor store. According to CBL, the new design used elements of the Wisconsin State Capitol, specifically noting the high chandeliers and wooden table and benches.

In 2003, the former Boston Store locations were demolished at both East Towne and West Towne and Dick's Sporting Goods stores were constructed at a total cost of $5.5 million. Those stores opened at the end of October 2004. Boston Store remained in both malls in the former location originally occupied by Prange's.

=== 2010s ===
Granite City, Charming Charlie, Toys "R" Us, Payless ShoeSource, and Gymboree all closed in the 2010s. Apple relocated to Hilldale Shopping Center.

In 2015, Sears Holdings spun off 235 of its properties, including the Sears at West Towne Mall, into Seritage Growth Properties.

On April 18, 2018, it was announced that Boston Store would be closing as its parent company, The Bon-Ton, was going out of business. The store was due to close in August 2018.

In 2017, the Sears store was downsized. Part of the Sears area became Dave & Buster's and Total Wine & More. Less than a year later on June 28, 2018, it was announced that Sears would also be closing permanently as part of a plan to close 78 stores nationwide. The store closed in September 2018. Part of the former Sears became Dave & Buster's and Total Wine & More.

=== 2020s ===
In 2021, Hobby Lobby opened a new store in the former Sears area, replacing their location at South Towne Mall. In October 2022, Von Maur opened in the former Boston Store location. Originally it was supposed to open in 2021 but got delayed a year due to the COVID-19 pandemic.
