= Janesville Transit System =

Public transit system in Janesville, Wisconsin

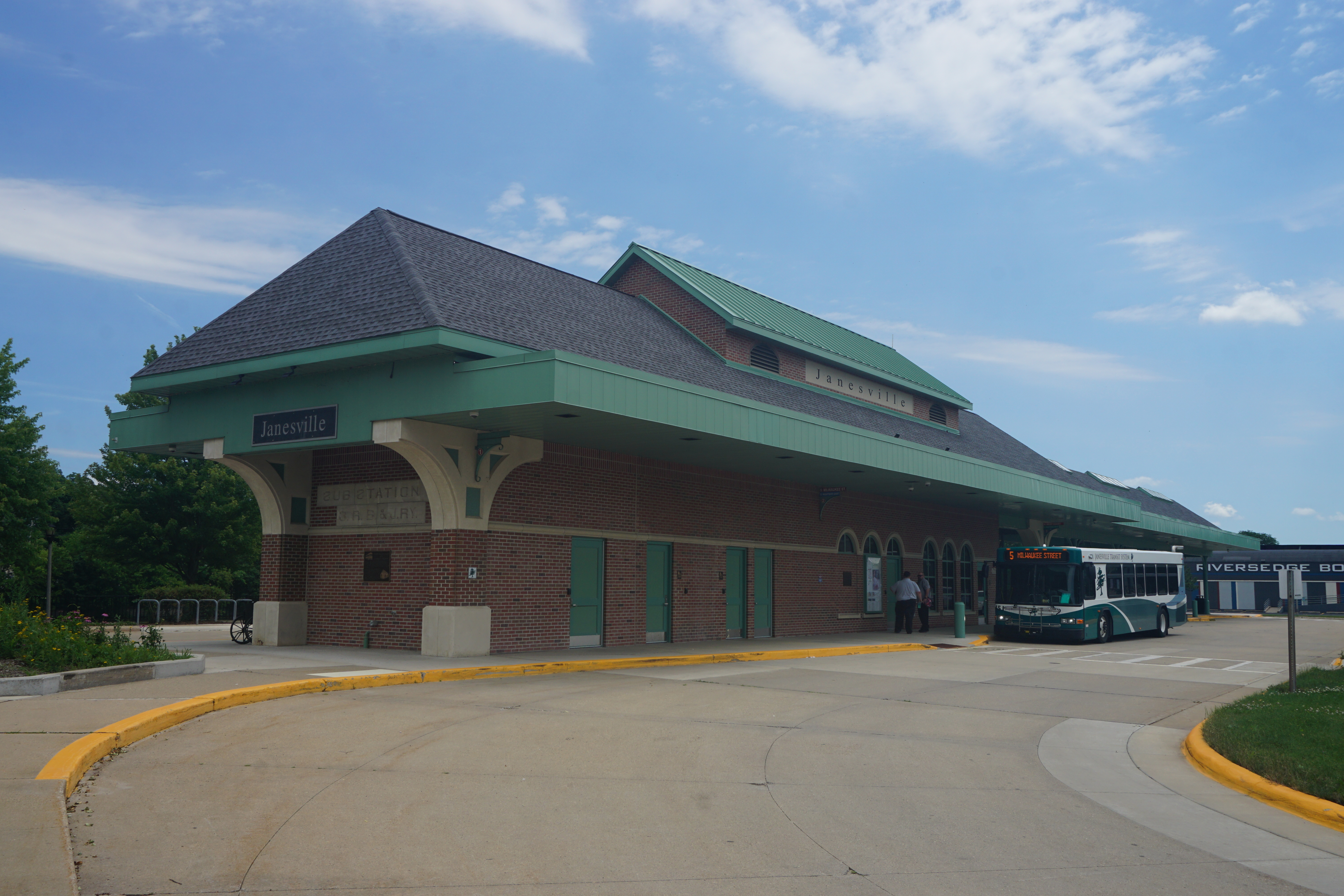
- The Janesville Bus Depot
- Parent: City of Janeville
- Headquarters: 101 Black Bridge Road
- Locale: Janesville, Wisconsin
- Service area: Rock County, Wisconsin
- Service type: Bus service, Paratransit
- Routes: 7
- Hubs: Janesville Transfer Center
- Fleet: 23
- Annual ridership: 351,559 (2022)
- Website: JTS

The Janesville Transit System, or JTS, is the primary provider of mass transportation in Janesville, Wisconsin. Using twenty vehicles, six regular routes are provided from Monday through Saturday. Late evening service is also available using the Nightline route deviation service. Along with Beloit Transit, the agency operates an express route between the associated cities.

== Routes ==
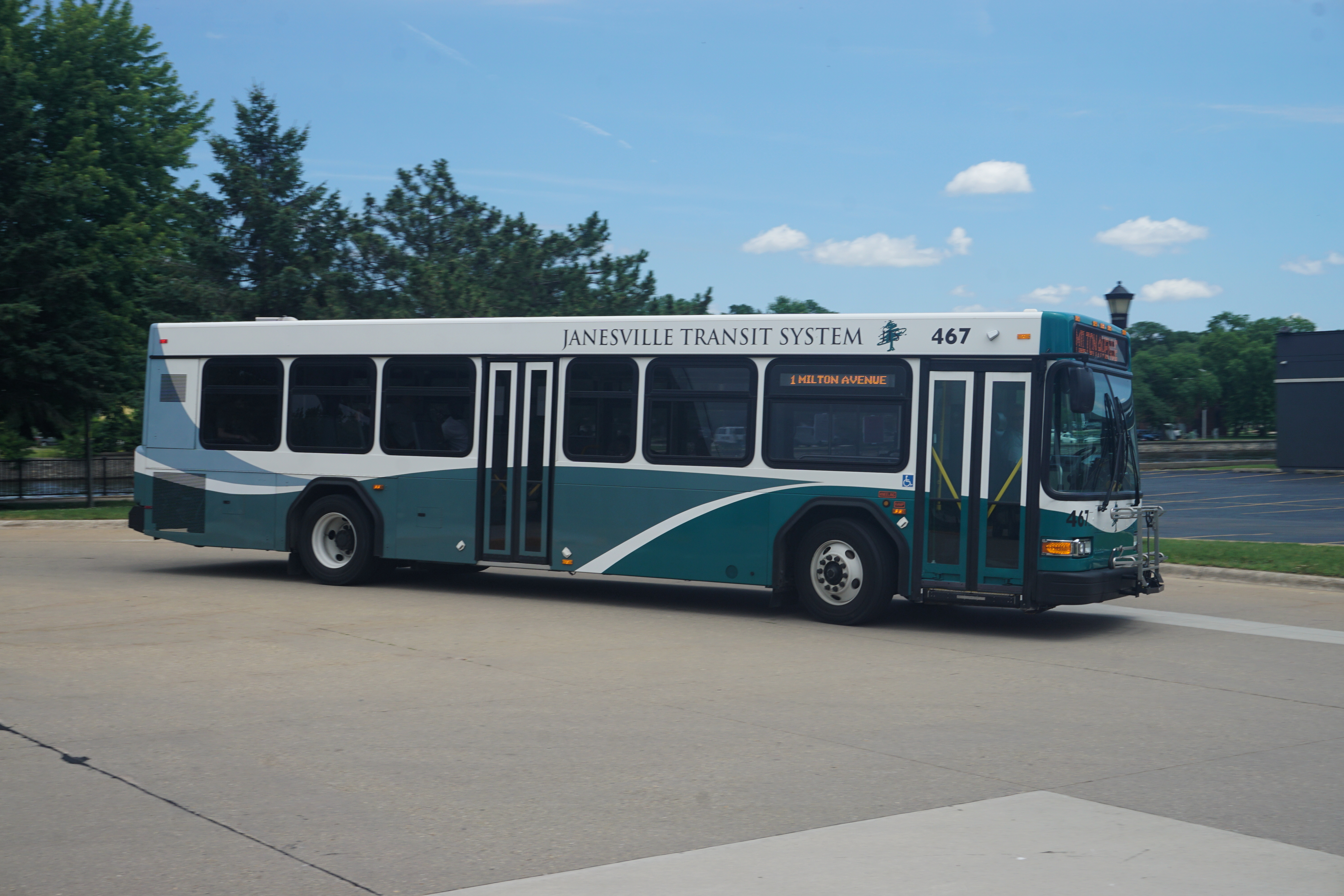
Janesville Transit System bus.

Day services Weekdays and Saturdays.

- Route 1: Milton Ave
- Route 2: Kellogg Ave
- Route 3: Wright Rd
- Route 4: Court St
- Route 5: Milwaukee St
- Route 6: Beloit-Janesville Express (No Saturday service)
- Special Routes are available during school days.

Buses run every half-hour during the daytime except route 5 and the Beloit-Janesville Express which run hourly.

Night services Weekday evenings.

- Nightside-Milton
- Nightside-Southwest
- Nightside-East

Night (evening) services run every hour and do not operate on Saturdays.

== Janesville Transfer Center ==
The Janesville Transfer Center at 123 South River Street was opened on May 18, 1998. It provides a central downtown location to transfer between routes, as well as with a daily intercity bus to Milwaukee. There are 8 bus bays in total. Greyhound Lines formerly used the facility until 2004. The Transfer Center has comfortable benches, covered loading bays for all buses, a climate controlled waiting room, vending machines, a change machine, restroom facilities, and a pleasant view of the Rock River. The Transfer Center is staffed weekday evenings from 6-10PM. During this time customers may purchase fare materials, ask questions in person or by phone, or request a nightside deviation.

Beginning April 4, 2022, and lasting until late 2022, the facility will undergo renovations to improve accessibility, warmth and add amenities to the transit center with a $1.5 million federal grant. The project includes a new roof, extra set of sliding doors to make the waiting room warmer, updated HVAC and plumbing systems, new bathrooms and a bigger break room for bus drivers.

== Ridership ==
	Ridership	Change over previous year
2013	510,646	n/a
2014	446,496	▼12.56%
2015	430,860	▼3.5%
2016	484,077	▲12.35%
2017	494,925	▲2.24%
2018	528,890	▲6.86%
2019	461,621	▼12.72%
2020	270,339	▼41.44%
2021	284,924	▲5.40%
2022	351,559	▲23.39%
2023	405,422	▲15.32%

== See also ==
- Beloit Transit
- Madison Metro Transit
- List of bus transit systems in the United States
