= East Towne Mall =

- Location: Madison, Wisconsin, United States
- Coordinates: 43°07′30.5″N 89°18′17.5″W
- Address: 89 East Towne Mall
- Opened: October 14, 1971, renovated 2003
- Developer: Jacobs, Visconsi, and Jacobs Co., Cleveland, Ohio
- Owner: CBL Properties
- Num. of stores: 115
- Num. of anchor tenants: 9 (7 open, 2 vacant)
- Floor area: 839,608 square feet (78,002.1 m^{2})
- Floors: 1 (2 in Dick's Sporting Goods, J. C. Penney, and former Boston Store)
- Parking: 4,964
- Public transit: Metro Transit
- Website: shopeasttowne-mall.com

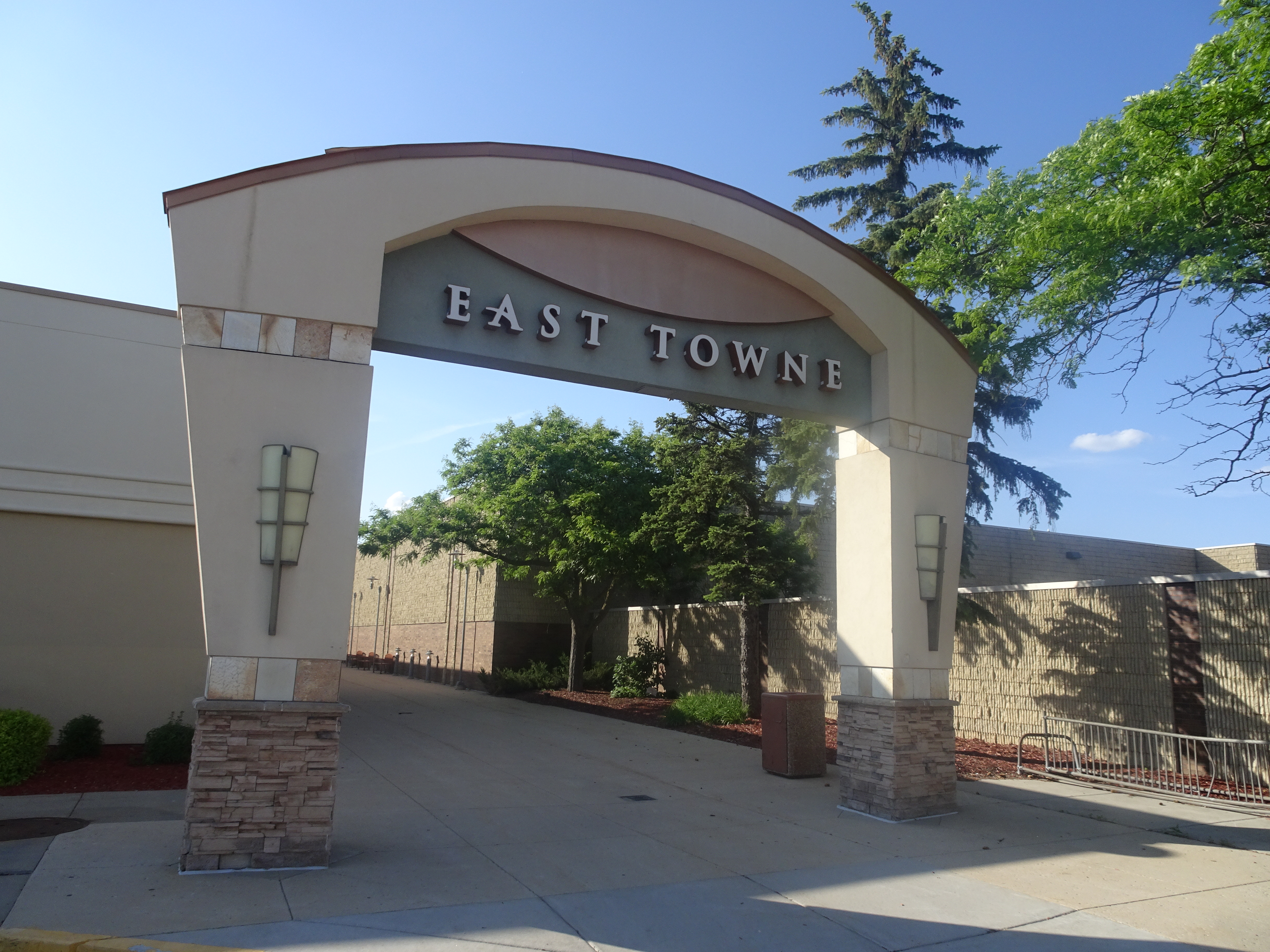
East Towne Mall Entrance

East Towne Mall is a shopping mall located on the northeast side of Madison, Wisconsin. The anchor stores are JCPenney, Shoe Carnival, Barnes & Noble, Planet Fitness, Flix Brewhouse, Thrill Factory, and Dick's Sporting Goods. There are 2 vacant anchor stores that were once Sears and Boston Store.

== History ==
The mall opened for business October 14, 1971 with a small ribbon cutting ceremony, a year after West Towne Mall opened on the west side of Madison. At the time it was constructed, East Towne was Madison's largest enclosed mall and had four large anchor stores, Sears, J. C. Penney, H. C. Prange Co., and Gimbel's. Prange Way also took up a section at the back of Pranges' space.

The mall and its sister mall, West Towne, were originally developed by Jacobs, Visconsi, and Jacobs Co. of Cleveland, Ohio, which was later known as the Richard E. Jacobs Group. CBL Properties purchased East Towne Mall, West Towne Mall and West Towne Crossing from Richard E. Jacobs Group in late 2000 as part of a $1.2 billion deal that included 23 properties. The deal was completed February 1, 2001. CBL refurbished both East Towne and West Towne unveiling the changes which included more skylights, family restrooms, improved interior decor, seating, flooring and other changes in November 2003. Stores added in 2003 included Steve & Barry's, CJ Banks and Helzberg Diamonds. A 26,000-square-foot (2,400 m^{2}) Barnes & Noble opened in March 2003 near the food court at the main entrance. The face lift to East Towne Mall cost $2.2 million and was the first significant change to the mall since the 1989 addition of a food court. The Barnes & Noble cost $1.8 million and the Dick's Sporting Goods project cost $5.5 million for both East Towne and West Towne. CBL remodeled the structure inside and out, and brought in new tenants to give the mall more of its own identity, rather than bring in the same tenants that West Towne has. There is a greater emphasis on regional names and gift shops, plus some national apparel shops that West Towne does not have.

The parking area was designed by Stone and Robinson Associates, Inc., originally 2,100,000 square feet (200,000 m^{2}) with a capacity of 6,000 cars and an average, maximum car-to-store distance of 350 ft (110 m). As a result of expansion of the main facility and construction projects on its perimeter, the parking area has since been reduced in size to hold fewer than 5,000 cars.

East Towne Mall was constructed near the intersection of U.S. Route 151 and Interstate 90/94, but was virtually alone when built on over 80 acres (320,000 m^{2}) of farmland. Now it rests in the center of a large retail area with a number of banks, restaurants and numerous chain big-box stores ranging from Best Buy and Shopko and The Home Depot.

Original logo of East Towne Mall.

Gimbel's became Boston Store in 1987 upon Gimbels' collapse a year earlier. Prange's became Younkers upon the buyout of the chain in 1992. Before the buyout, Prange Way closed, allowing Younker's to expand into the large section the discount store had originally taken. Younker's was renamed the Boston Store at this mall, as well as the West Towne Mall and Regency Mall's locations in 2003 when then-owners Saks Inc. consolidated all southern Wisconsin stores into one banner. Once the consolidation was complete, the Boston Store which occupied the former Gimbel's location was closed.

The original Gimbel's structure was razed and is now a Dick's Sporting Goods, Gordmans which opened in September 2004, and new mall space. Dick's Sporting Goods' grand opening was at the end of October, 2004.

On April 18, 2018, it was announced that Boston Store would be closing as its parent company, The Bon-Ton, was going out of business. The store closed on August 29, 2018.

On February 22, 2020, it was announced that Gordmans would be closing.

On June 23, 2020, it was announced that Sears would be closing as part of a plan to close 28 stores nationwide.

On July 31, 2020, JCPenney put 21 stores up for sale, including its location at the mall.

As of 2023, the mall comprises over 100 shops and services, a food court, with about a dozen eateries, and a small format Barnes & Noble store adjacent to the food court. From the mall's opening until c. 2003, the mall also had a six-screen movie theater, which from the middle of the 1980s to about 2003 was called Budget Cinemas and owned by Silver Cinemas. It closed in 2003 because Budget Cinemas Mall Wing Entrance and other stores near the entrance were bought by Steve & Barry's, with the mall entrance turned into the entrance for Steve & Barry's. Steve & Barry's closed in December 2008, and was a Steinhafels, a local furniture chain, but now is a Flix Brewhouse, a multiplex cinema and brewery hybrid chain, based out of Texas.

On December 31, 2024, Thrill Factory replaced the Gordmans.

== Architecture ==
The mall was developed by Jacobs, Visconsi, and Jacobs Company of Cleveland, Ohio. Construction began September 18, 1970. Originally, the mall contained eight water pools and sunken lounge areas. Artists Clarence Van Duzer and Joseph McDonnell were commissioned to create art work for the mall. McDonnell created four sculptures, including a 3,000 pound metal yellow rhinoceros with red polka dots made of half-inch steel plates. Another was a 35'x22' chandelier-like work suspended above one of the entryways. The chandelier was multi-colored and, according to McDonnell, was inspired by a game of pick-up sticks and designed to resemble "a galaxy of light" from outside the center. Van Duzen was responsible for the large central area with its 30-foot (9.1 m) ceiling and four contemporary pillars. In the center was a large three-level pool with waterfalls, a 15-foot (4.6 m) fountain, and flashing lights, all synchronized to music. The main entrance was flanked by sculpted stone blocks in relief with irregular shapes and sizes. All the water sculptures and sunken lounge areas were removed in the late 1980s and the main entrance was redesigned, with the addition of a food court.

== 1977 parking lot murder ==
On August 7, 1977, serial killer Joseph Paul Franklin shot and killed Alphonce Manning Jr., a black man and Toni Schwenn, a white woman, in their car in the front parking lot at East Towne Mall. The motive was not immediately known and crime was initially suspected to be racially motivated. The crime was unsolved until 1984 when Franklin contacted Madison Police to confess from an Illinois prison while serving a life sentence for another racially motivated killing. Franklin was convicted for the East Towne murders and given two life sentences in 1986.

== Property rights decision ==
West Towne and East Towne malls were at the center of a mid-1980s Wisconsin Supreme Court case. In Jacobs v. Major, an anti-nuclear dance group, called the Nu Parable dancers, was barred from performing a dance which ended in a "die-in" on the mall's property. At issue was the right of non-consensual use of private property for freedom of speech purposes. In 1987, the Wisconsin Supreme Court ruled 4–3 in favor of the mall owner's right to exclude Nu Parable from both malls.
