= Beloit Transit =

Transit agency in Beloit, Wisconsin

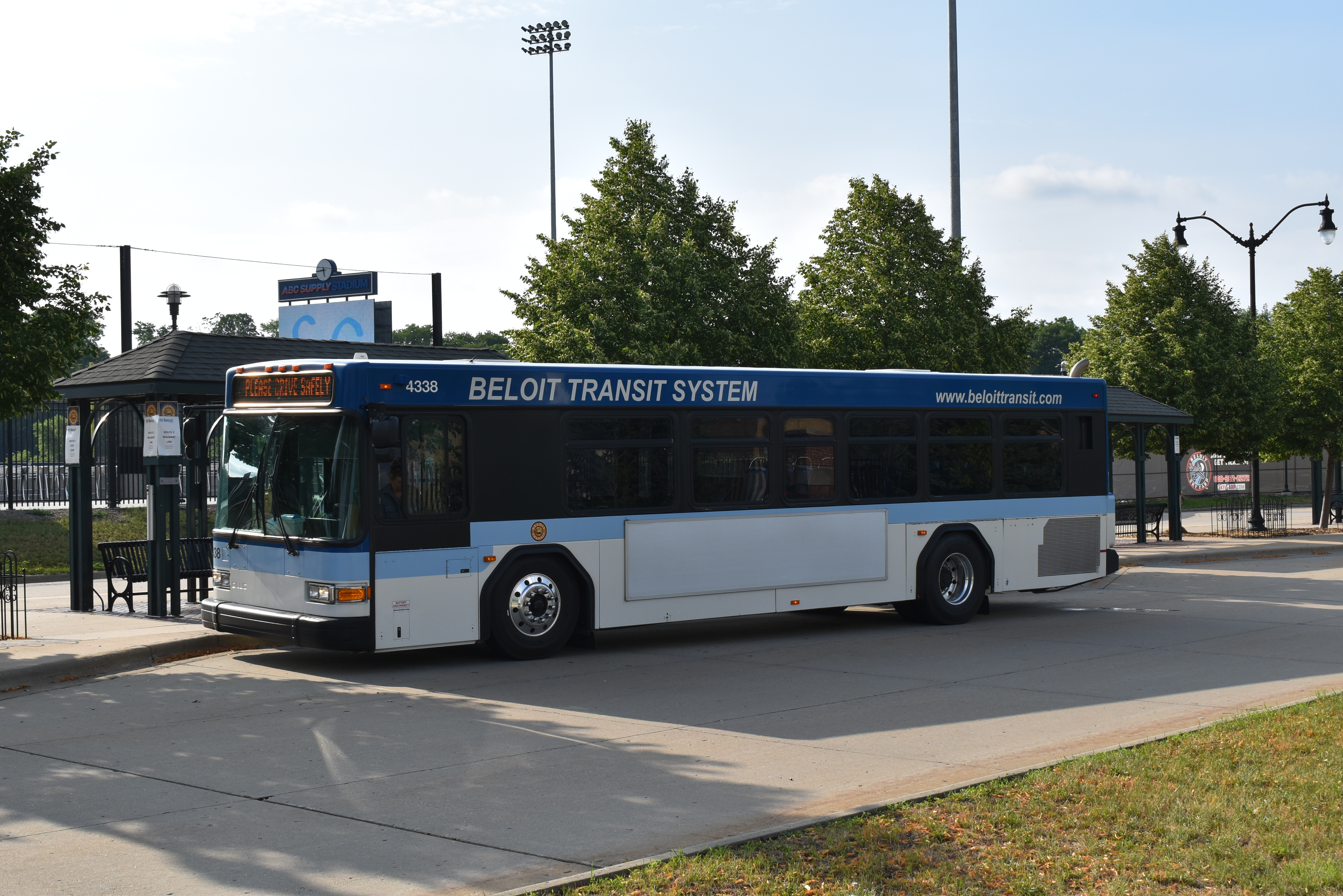
- A Beloit Transit bus in July 2022
- Headquarters: 1225 Willowbrook, Beloit, WI
- Locale: Beloit, WI
- Service type: bus service, paratransit
- Routes: 7
- Fleet: 21
- Annual ridership: 95,365 (2022)
- Website: https://www.beloittransit.com/

Beloit Transit is the public transportation system in Beloit, Wisconsin, United States. It is owned and operated by the City of Beloit.

== History ==
Public transit in Beloit began in 1902 with interurbans serving the city. Proper streetcar service followed in 1906 run by the Beloit Traction Company. Buses replaced streetcar service on August 12, 1930, and privately operated buses continued to ply Beloit's streets until April 1, 1972, when the city took over operations. In 1977, service expanded to South Beloit, Illinois.

New automated fareboxes were rolled out in 2020, followed by a new route on the east side of Beloit in 2021. Free fares were offered for one week to raise awareness of the route change. In June 2022, Beloit Transit purchased its first hybrid bus, replacing a 15 year old diesel bus. The new bus was primarily funded by a federal grant and is expected to enter the fleet in 2023. The hybrid bus will allow Beloit Transit to save $1,100 per year in diesel costs and reduce greenhouse gas emissions by 18 tons.

== Services ==
The transit system operates seven routes including the Beloit-Janesville Express, which connects with the Janesville Transit System. Service is only provided Monday through Friday from 5:29am to 6:22pm. The downtown transfer facility is located at 225 Shirland Ave. All routes except Route 4 and Route 5 operate from the transfer facility. In September 2020, the council approved changes to the transit system that boosted coverage of the city's population and employment destinations to 86%, up from 70% coverage while also bolstering coverage to Beloit business destinations from 53% to 66% for employees without personal transportation.

- Route 1: Serves northwest Beloit, including the Transfer Center, and Woodman's Transfer Point
- Route 2: Serves northeast Beloit, including the Transfer Center, and Piggly Wiggly Transfer Point
- Route 3: Serves eastern Beloit, including the Transfer Center, and Piggly Wiggly Transfer Point
- Route 4: Serves northern Beloit, including the Piggly Wiggly Transfer Point
- Route 5: Serves northern Beloit, including Piggly Wiggly Transfer Point.
- Route 6: Serves northern Beloit, including the Transfer Center, and Piggly Wiggly Transfer Point
- BJE: Beloit Janesville Express, connects with Janesville Transit System

== Beloit Transfer Center ==
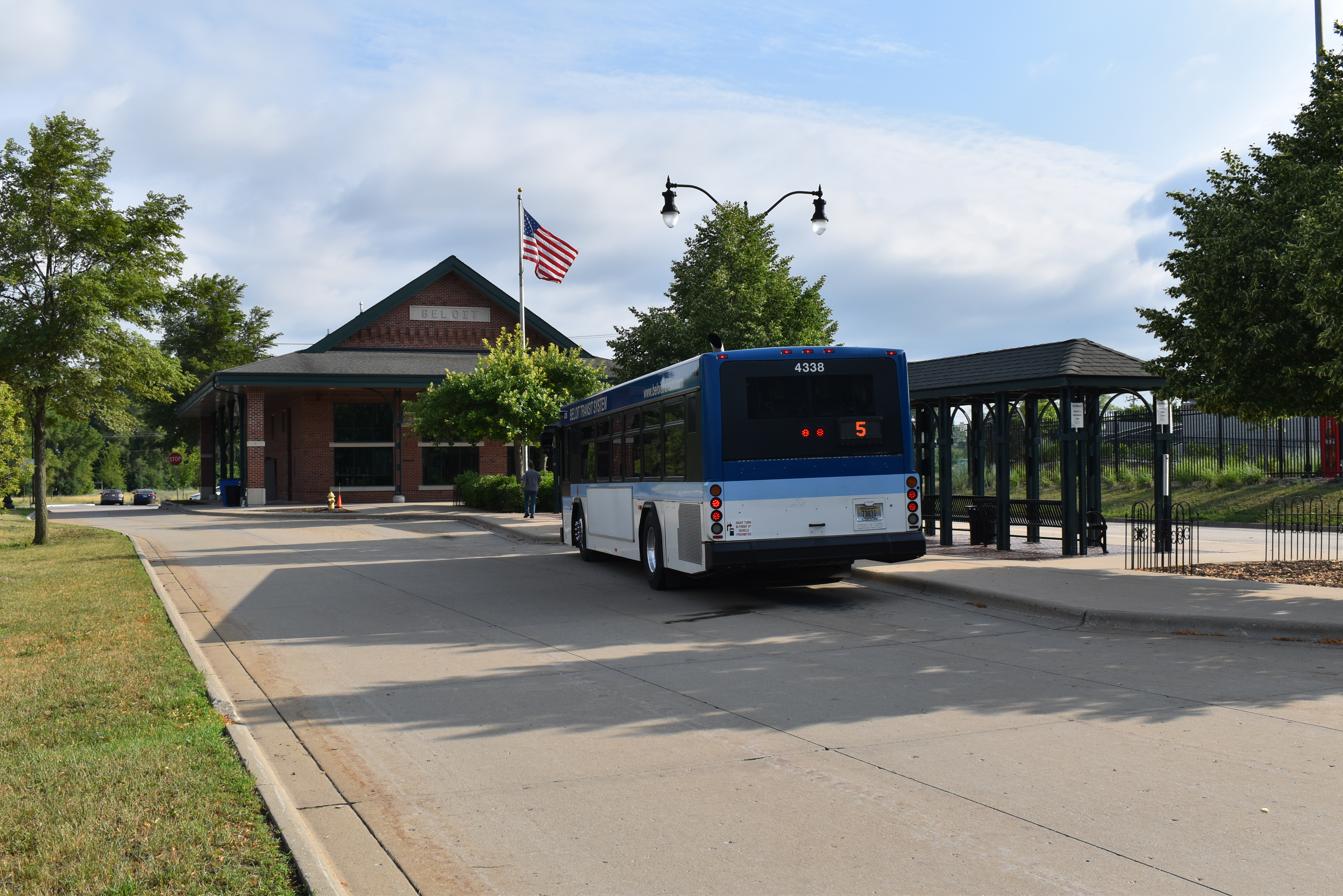
Beloit Transfer Center

In 2005, the Beloit Transfer Center was re-located from the Beloit Mall to the corner of Broad St and Pleasant St. A permanent transfer facility was built in 2009 south of downtown Beloit near the corner of Shirland Ave and Mill St, next to the Beloit City Hall. In addition to serving as the hub for local and express bus service, the Beloit Transfer Center includes public restrooms, indoor waiting area, driver break room, and a customer service room. Due to its location on the south end of town, BTS bus routes must travel up to an additional 5 minutes than if the center were more centrally located.

== Ridership ==
	Ridership	Change over previous year
2013	254,851	n/a
2014	243,698	▼4.38%
2015	201,826	▼17.18%
2016	184,013	▼8.83%
2017	149,978	▼18.5%
2018	146,393	▼2.39%
2019	95,997	▼34.43%
2020	48,805	▼49.16%
2021	80,812	▲65.58%
2022	95,365	▲18.01%
2023	109,675	▲15.01%

== See also ==
- Janesville Transit System
- RMTD
- List of bus transit systems in the United States
