= Metro Transit (Madison) =

Public transit operator in Madison, Wisconsin and vicinity

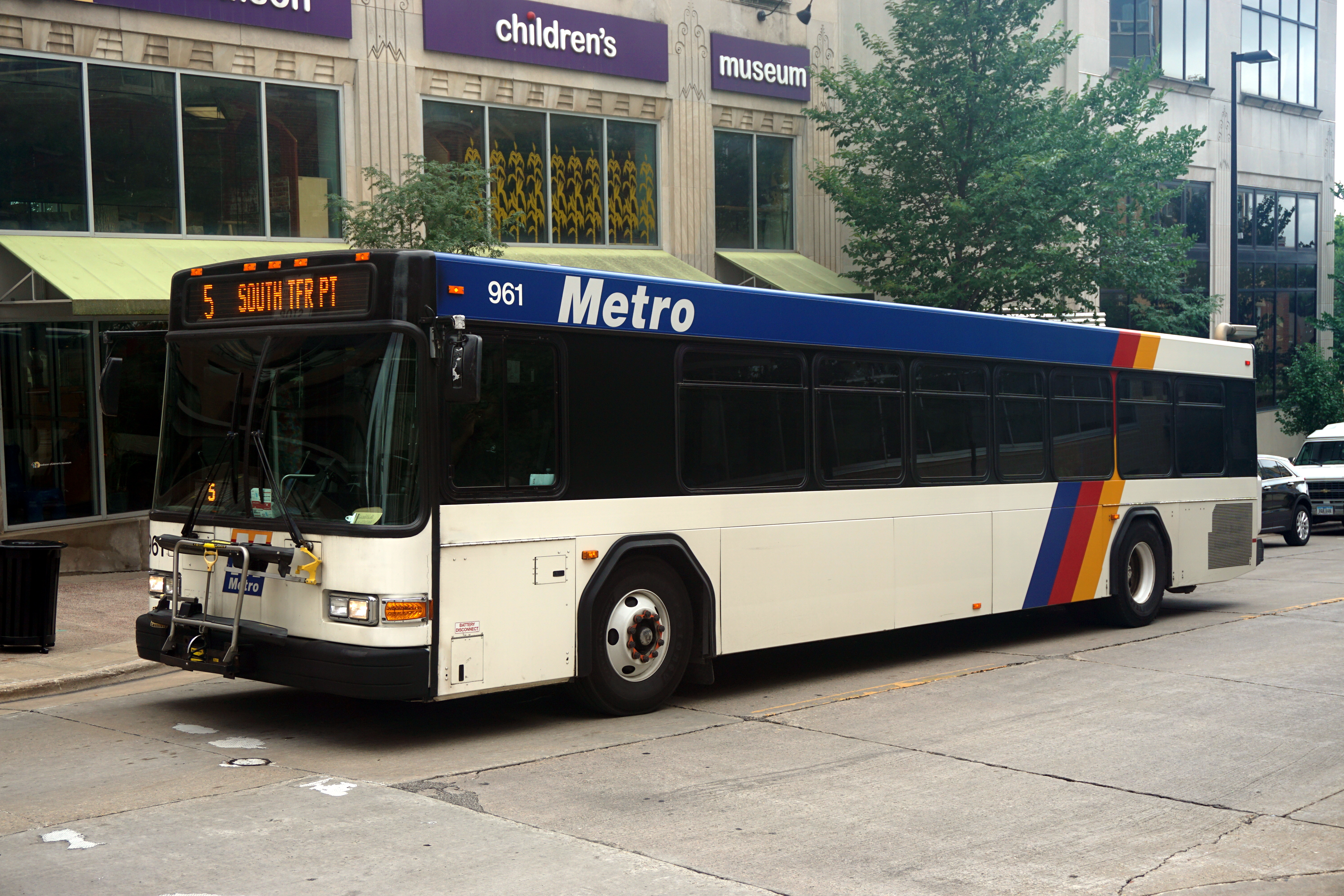
- Parent: City of Madison
- Headquarters: 1245 E. Washington Ave.
- Locale: Madison, Wisconsin and its suburbs
- Service type: Bus service, Bus Rapid Transit, paratransit (contracted)
- Stops: 1,346
- Destinations: Fitchburg, Maple Bluff, Middleton, Monona, Shorewood Hills, Verona, McFarland, Sun Prairie
- Fleet: 188
- Daily ridership: 38,000 (weekdays, Q2 2026)
- Annual ridership: 12,300,000 (2025)
- Fuel type: Low sulfur diesel, Hybrid diesel-electric, and battery electric buses
- Operator: City of Madison
- General Manager: Jamie Acton
- Website: cityofmadison.com/metro

Metro Transit, formerly Madison Metro, operates bus services throughout the city of Madison, Wisconsin, and several of its suburbs, including Middleton, Fitchburg, Maple Bluff, Monona, Shorewood Hills, Sun Prairie, and Verona. System-wide, fixed route ridership was over 12,300,000 in 2025. Metro Transit serves the University of Wisconsin–Madison campus, the university's Eagle Heights apartments, and some off-campus residential areas via routes 80, 81, 82, and 84, which are free of charge to students, faculty, employees, and visitors. Metro Transit also provides supplemental transit services to Madison's high schools when they are in session.

== History ==
Bus service in Madison was originally owned by a private company. It was established in 1910 to serve parts of Madison that were not served by streetcars. In 1928, an ice storm heavily damaged the streetcar lines. The bus company replaced the streetcar lines with buses. After the company's revenues fell and the quality of service declined in the 1960s, the city agreed to purchase the Madison Bus Company, with the acquisition taking effect on May 1, 1970.

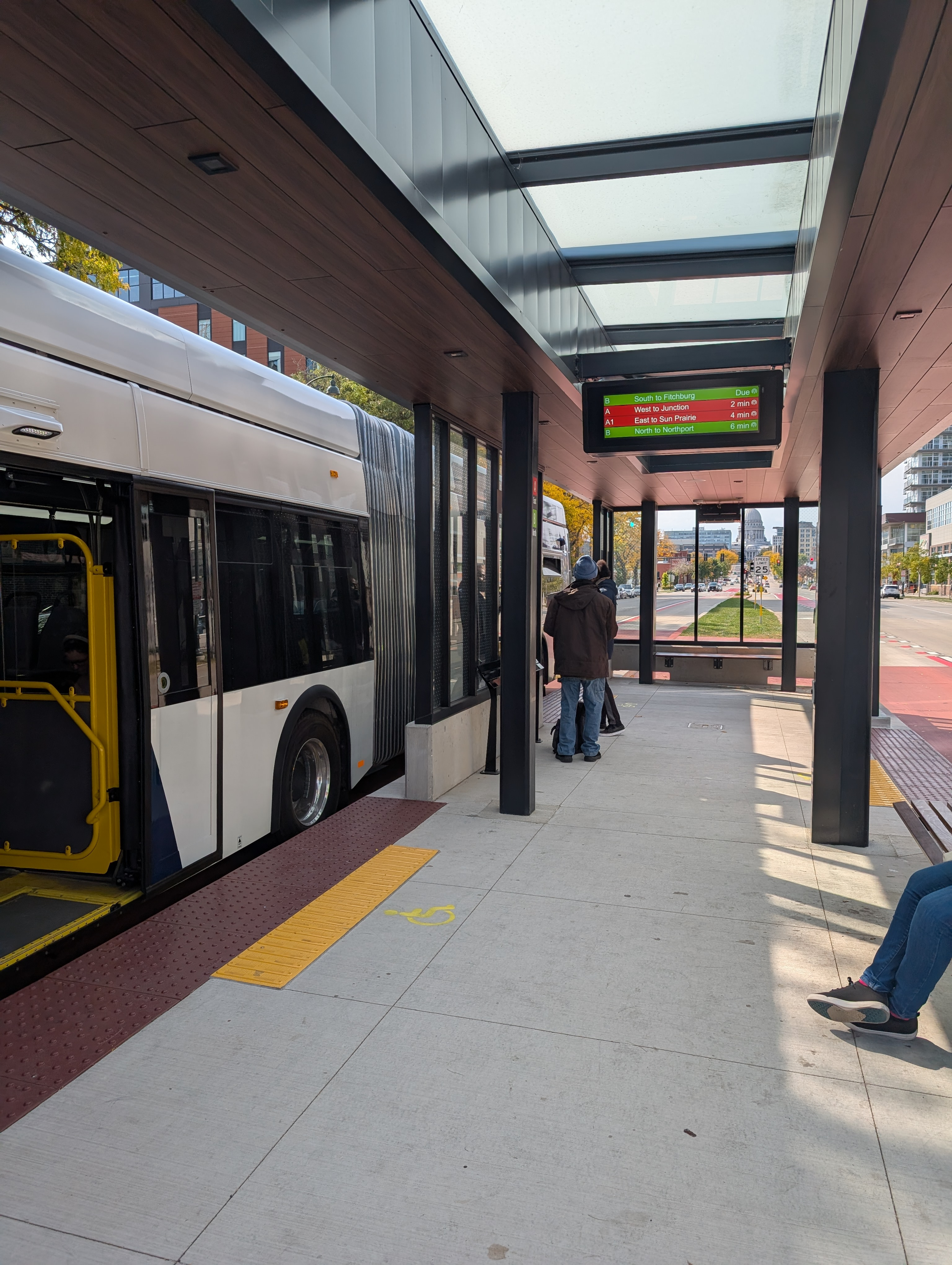
Metro Rapid bus at Paterson Street Station

Metro Transit's routes were dramatically overhauled on July 19, 1998. Previously, all routes had passed through Capitol Square, making downtown the only interchange point for cross-town travel. The 1998 changes redesigned the entire network around four newly created "transfer points" on the north, east, south, and west sides of the city. The number of routes nearly doubled, from 23 to 43. Additionally, while the old routes had been indicated with letters, the new routes were given numbers to illustrate that they had no connection to the previous network. This transfer point system had been proposed as early as 1970, while the city was in the process of acquiring the bus company, by city council candidate Audrey Parkinson.

In 2019, Metro Transit updated its logo and bus look. The same year, several middle schools switched to yellow buses.

Several routes were suspended in 2020 due to the COVID-19 pandemic and did not return.

In 2023, the route network was overhauled to one with fewer routes and more frequent service. The newly redesigned network was launched on June 11, 2023. Most of the new routes are lettered rather than numbered. The north, east, and west transfer points were eliminated from the network. The south transfer point is still used and will eventually be replaced with standard streetside bus shelters and the transfer point will be redeveloped. The change has had a mixed reception; some have praised the redesign for more frequent service with fewer transfers, while others have criticized the redesign for eliminating service where the elderly, disabled, and low-income populations used to be able to ride the bus.

The same summer, the school routes received a handful of updates. Previously the school routes were lettered, but the routes are now numbered, each route has a triple-digit number. For the first time, supplemental school service was provided to Capital High, which had just moved into the former Hoyt School building. The remaining middle schools switched to yellow buses as part of recent route changes.

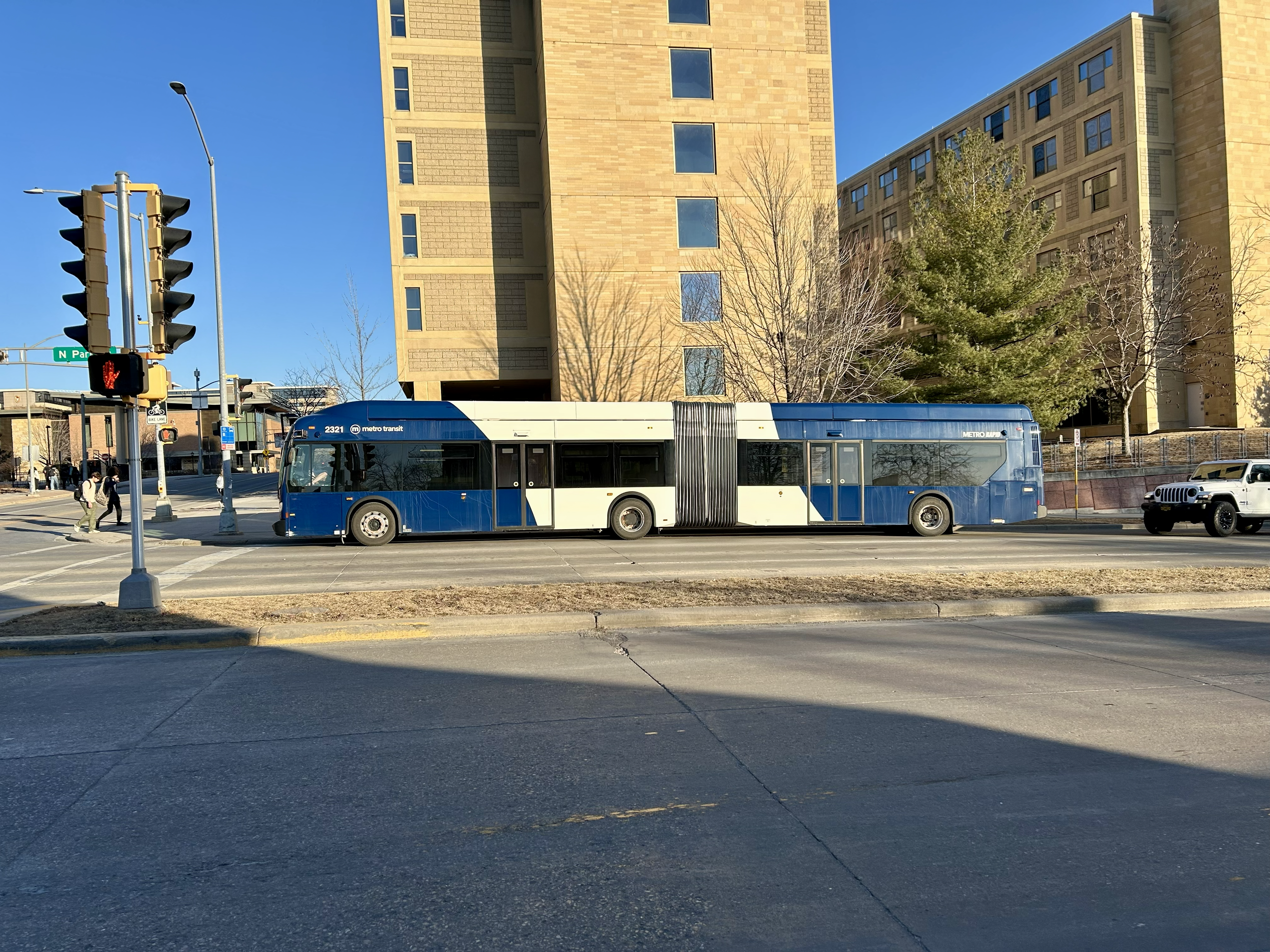
Metro Rapid Route B articulated bus at N Park at W Dayton stop

In December 2023 the Monona city council voted to join the Metro Transit network, Metro extended peak hour weekday service on Route 38 as well as opening stops along the existing G and L routes that previously did not serve the village. This replaced the Monona Express commuter service.

On September 22, 2024, Metro Transit launched its first bus rapid transit line, Rapid Route A, to replace a core east–west bus route. Various city and regional governments had studied bus rapid transit and other high-capacity systems, including light rail, to serve the Madison area as early as the 1980s, but did not begin formal planning of a bus rapid transit system until 2011.

== Route network ==
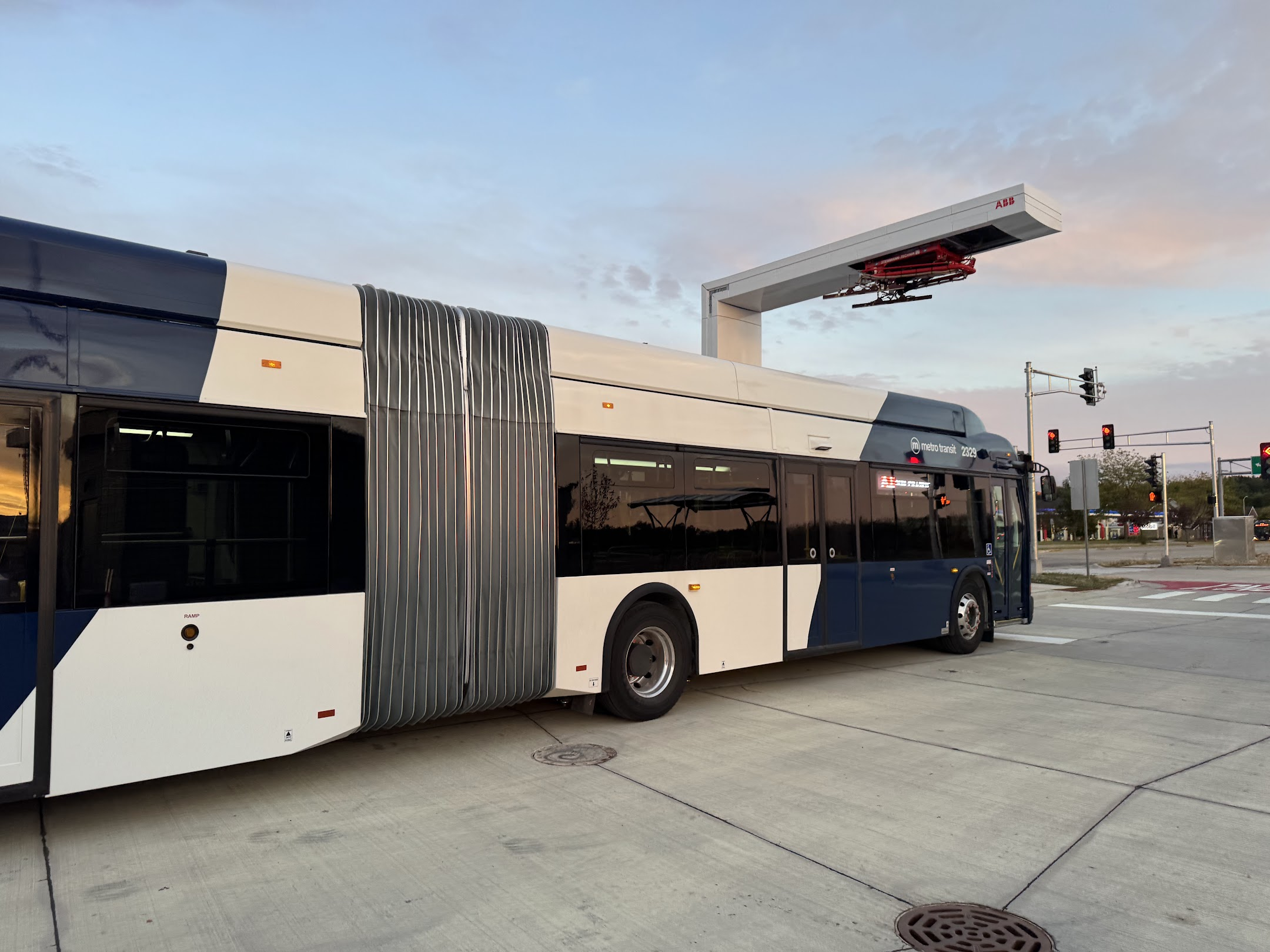
Metro Rapid bus charging station.

The transit network focuses on point-to-point service, with some routes having different destinations but sharing the same core segments. Many routes serve downtown Madison and the University of Wisconsin–Madison where transit usage is high.

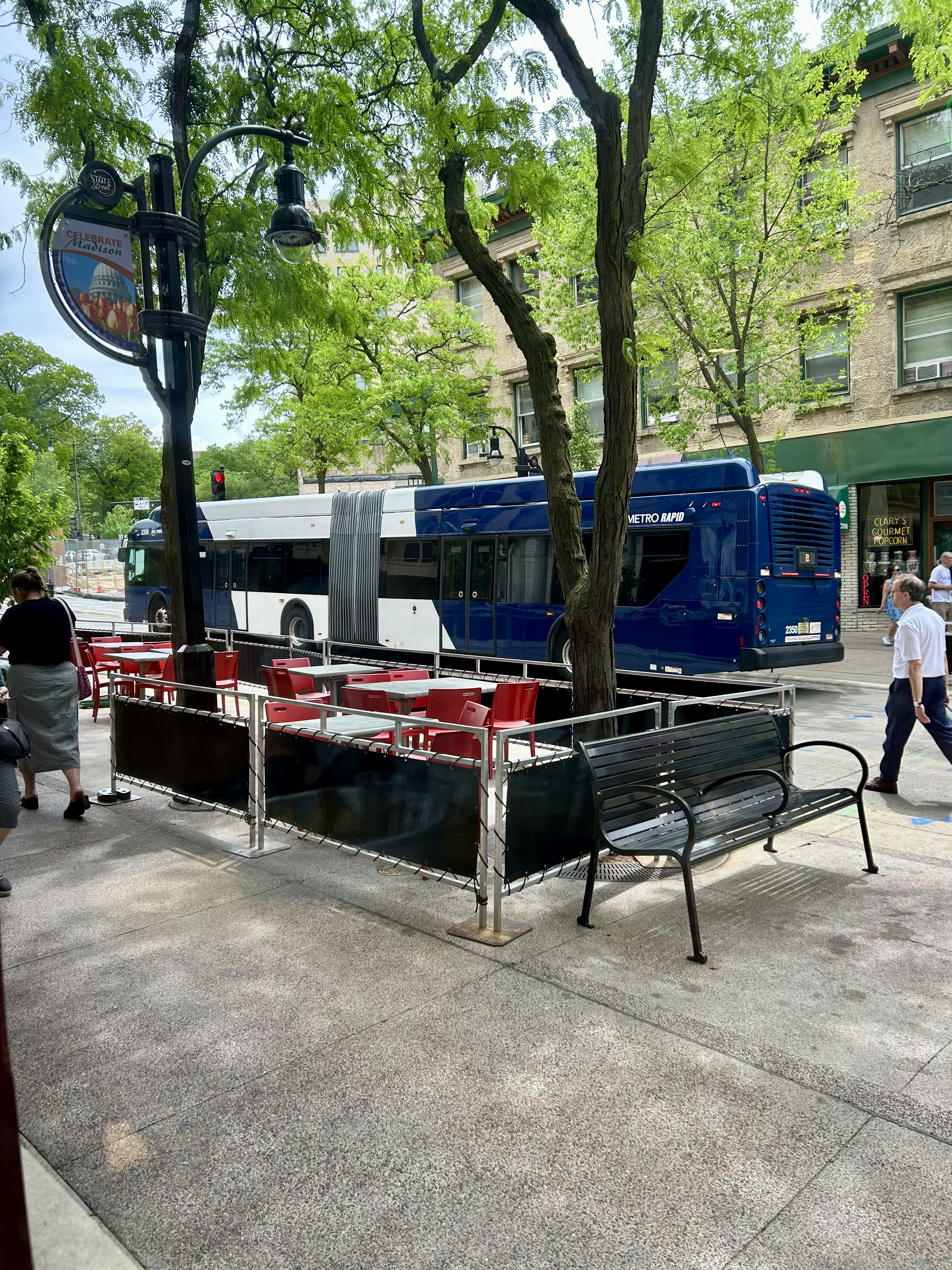
Metro Rapid bus on State Street

The vast majority of services reflected in this section went into effect in June 2023. Significant changes included restructuring the main route network, discontinuing the previous transfer point system, and reintroducing lettered routes, replacing the previous numbering system. Although a small amount of weekday commuter routes remained numbered for administrative reasons. The University of Wisconsin circulator network was largely unaffected by the changes and retained its previous numbers/ routes.

=== Bus rapid transit ===
In the early 2020s, Metro Transit began design and construction of a bus rapid transit system that offers faster and more frequent service. The first line is Rapid Route A, an east–west line that replaced Route A on September 22, 2024. It cost $195 million to construct, with a majority of funds from a federal grant, and includes articulated battery-powered buses, center-running bus lanes and stations. The line also features buses that run every 5 to 15 minutes during weekday hours. A north–south line will replace Route B in 2028 pending federal funding.

=== Regular routes ===
All routes in the table below run daily with varying service levels given the time/day. For example, route B runs every 15 minutes on weekdays, but every 30 minutes during evenings and Sundays.

Route	Terminals (Note: Routes may have multiple start/end points.)		Major streets (Note: Sections of roads with more than two concurrent routes are generally omitted for conciseness.)	Notes	Headway (Note: Key: W is Weekday, E is Evening, Sa is Saturday, Su is Sunday or holidays.)	Branch Headway	Monthly Ridership (Note: April 2025)
Rapid A	Junction Rd Park & Ride	1: Sun Prairie Park & Ride	East Springs Dr, High Crossing Blvd	BRT route	W/Sa: 15 m E/Su: 30 m	W/Sa: 30 m E/Su: 60 m	194,163
Rapid A	Junction Rd Park & Ride	2: American Center/Hanson Rd	American Pkwy, Eastpark Blvd	BRT route	W/Sa: 15 m E/Su: 30 m	W/Sa: 30 m E/Su: 60 m	194,163
B	Fitchburg/Cahill Main	Northport Dr	Fish Hatchery Rd, Park St, Packers Ave	Planned North-South BRT route. Operates as BRT within Rapid A corridor.	W/Sa: 15 m E/Su: 30 m	N/A	173,447
C	UW Hospital/Highland Ave	1: Sprecher & Cottage Grove	Old University Ave, King St, Wilson St, Jenifer St, Winnebago St, Atwood Ave	Interlines with Route R evenings, weekends, and holidays at UW Hospital.	W: 15 m E/Sa/Su: 30 m	W: 20 m (Note: Headways consist of a pattern of 15 min, 15 min, 30 min.) E/Sa/Su: 60 m	128,908
C	UW Hospital/Highland Ave	2: Buckeye Rd	Old University Ave, King St, Wilson St, Jenifer St, Winnebago St, Atwood Ave	Interlines with Route R evenings, weekends, and holidays at UW Hospital.	W: 15 m E/Sa/Su: 30 m	W/E/Sa/Su: 60 m	128,908
D	1: Junction Rd Park & Ride	Sprecher & Cottage Grove	Schroeder Rd, Tokay Blvd, Odana Rd, Milwaukee St		W: 15 m E/Sa/Su: 30 m	W: 30 m E/Sa/Su: 60 m	124,065
D	2: Epic – West End Cir/Verona High School	Airport/International Ln	Fitchrona Rd, Williamsburg Way, Allied Dr, Nakoma Rd, Sherman Ave	West terminus at West End Circle evenings, weekends, and holidays	W: 15 m E/Sa/Su: 30 m	W: 30 m E/Sa/Su: 60 m	124,065
E	McKee & Maple Grove	Capitol Square	Raymond Rd, Whitney Way, Mineral Point Rd, Regent St, W. Washington Ave		W: 30 m E/Sa/Su: 60 m	N/A	27,819
F	Junction Rd Park & Ride–Middleton	Sheboygan Ave–Capitol Square	Deming Way, University Ave, Parmenter St, Century Ave, Allen Blvd, Sheboygan Ave	Operates as BRT within Rapid A corridor. East terminus at Segoe evenings, weekends, and holidays.	W/E/Sa/Su: 30 m	N/A	37,979
G	South Transfer Point	East Towne Mall/Independence Ln	Badger Rd, South Towne Dr, E. Broadway, Monona Dr, Dempsey Rd, Thompson Rd, Eagan Rd	Serves City of Monona.	W/E/Sa/Su: 30 m	N/A	38,358
H	West Towne Mall/Westfield Rd	South Transfer Point	Gammon Rd, McKenna Blvd, Raymond Rd, Todd Dr, Fish Hatchery Rd, Badger Rd		W/E/Sa/Su: 30 m	N/A	28,981
J	West Towne Mall/Westfield Rd	Park St/Brooks & Johnson	Odana Rd, Tokay Blvd, Speedway Rd, Highland Ave/UW Hospital		W: 30 m E/Sa/Su: 60 m	N/A	19,375
L	Femrite & Agriculture	Sherman & Delaware	Owl Creek Rd, Dutch Mill Rd, Agriculture Dr, Pflaum Rd, Atwood Ave, Sherman Ave	Serves City of Monona; comes close to Village of McFarland border.	W/E/Sa/Su: 75 m	N/A	6,247
O	South Transfer Point	Park St/Brooks & Johnson-Park & Erin/St. Mary's Hospital	Badger Rd, Fish Hatchery Rd, Randall Ave, Olin Ave, John Nolen Dr, Rimrock Rd	Most peak hour trips terminate at St. Mary's Hospital	(Note: This frequency refers to the service between Brooks & Johnson and St. Mary's Hospital) W: 20 m (Note: Headways consist of a pattern of 15 min, 15 min, 30 min.) E/Sa/Su: 60 m	(Note: This frequency refers to the service to the remainder of the route) W/E/Sa/Su: 60 m	15,016
P	Independence & E Washington/East Towne Mall (loop)	Independence & E Washington/East Towne Mall (loop)	Hayes Rd, Portage Rd, Anniversary Ln		W/E/Sa/Su: 30 m	N/A	3,939
R	1: Junction Rd Park & Ride	UW Hospital/Highland Ave–Capitol Square	High Point Rd, Old Sauk Rd, Old Middleton Rd	East terminus at UW Hospital evenings, weekends and holidays. Interlines with Route C evenings, weekends and holidays at UW Hospital.	W/E/Sa/Su: 30 m	W/E/Sa/Su: 60 m	26,927
R	2: South Ridge/Highway Q & Century Ave (Middleton)	UW Hospital/Highland Ave–Capitol Square	Century Ave, University Ave, Gammon Rd	East terminus at UW Hospital evenings, weekends and holidays. Interlines with Route C evenings, weekends and holidays at UW Hospital.	W/E/Sa/Su: 30 m	W/E/Sa/Su: 60 m	26,927

=== Sun Prairie circulator service ===
Metro Transit provides two local bus routes within the City of Sun Prairie. Both routes run on a looping circulator system that begins and ends at the Sun Prairie Park and Ride, where it is possible to transfer to Rapid A (BRT) into the city of Madison and connect with the rest of the Metro system. Route S runs seven days a week, including holidays, with 60 minute headways, and route W operates on weekdays only with 30 minute headways. Route W previously interlined with the mainline east-west Route A at the Park & Ride, allowing for a single seat ride from Sun Prairie to downtown Madison, campus and points west. This ended with the launch of the Rapid A service.

Route	Terminal	Major Streets	Notes	Monthly Ridership (Note: April 2025)
S	Sun Prairie Park & Ride (counterclockwise loop)	O'Keefe Ave, Main St, Bristol St, Tower Dr, Windsor St, Grand Ave, Reiner Rd		2,161
W	Sun Prairie Park & Ride (clockwise loop)	O'Keefe Ave, Main St, Bristol St, Bird St, US 151 (no stops), Grand Ave, Reiner Rd	Weekdays only	2,696

=== Weekday peak-only routes ===
Route	Terminals		Major Streets (Note: Sections of roads with more than two concurrent routes are generally omitted for conciseness.)	Notes	Monthly Ridership (Note: April 2025)
28	University Row	Sherman Ave	Observatory Dr/UW Campus, Charter St, Fordem Ave		47,768
38	University Row	Jenifer & Ingersoll or Monona/Dutch Mill	Babcock Dr/UW Campus, Bassett St, Broom St, Wilson St, Doty St, Williamson St	Monona Service	51,338
55	Junction Rd Park & Ride	Epic Campus	High Point Rd, Mid Town Rd, Northern Lights Rd		4,271
65	UW Hospital	Fitchburg	John Nolen Dr, Rimrock Rd, Lacy Rd, E. Cheryl Pkwy		6,716
75	Epic Campus/Verona	Capitol Square	Verona Ave, McKee Rd, Fish Hatchery Rd, Park St		14,237

=== UW–Madison campus buses ===
All UW campus routes are fare free. Operating costs are paid by various university departments and student organizations. When UW–Madison is not in session, service is reduced on routes 80 and 84, and routes 81 and 82 do not run.

Route	Terminals		Major Streets (Note: Sections of roads with more than two concurrent routes are generally omitted for conciseness.)	Notes	Monthly Ridership (Note: April 2025)
80	Memorial Union	Eagle Heights/UW Hospital	Observatory Dr, Highland Ave, University Bay Dr, Lake Mendota Dr, Randall Ave, Dayton St, Lake St	Route terminates at UW Hospital during peak hours.	279,044
81	Memorial Union (loop)	Memorial Union (loop)	Langdon St, Wisconsin Ave, Gorham St, Lake St, Kohl Center, Broom St, Bassett St	Overnight service evening - early AM	4,353
82	Memorial Union (loop)	Memorial Union (loop)	Observatory Dr, University Ave, Breese Terrace/ Camp Randall, Regent St, Park St, Lake St	Overnight service evening - early AM	18,156
84	Linden & Charter	Eagle Heights	Observatory Dr, Highland Ave, University Bay Dr, Lake Mendota Dr, Linden St	Peak hours only	21,233

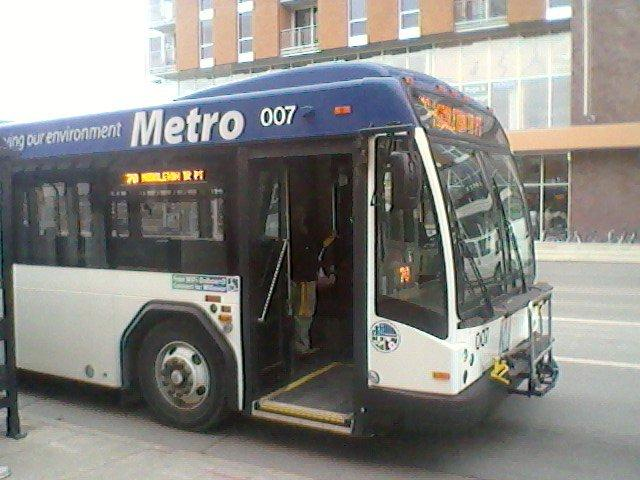
Hybrid bus on University Ave.

=== Supplemental school service ===
This is additional peak-hour service run when the Madison Metropolitan School District is in session. These routes are open to the general public.

- 60x – East High School District
- 61x – La Follette High School District
- 62x – Memorial High School District
- 63x – West High School District
- 64x – Capital High School District

== Fleet ==
- Numerous between 909-999 & 100–160 Gillig Low Floor (40' ft) (Many are used mostly for school and peak-hour service.)
- 001–021 Gillig BRT Hybrid
- 1901–1915 New Flyer Xcelsior (40' ft) added in 2019.
- 2001–2003 Proterra, Inc. Electric Buses, joined fleet in the summer of 2020, began service late 2022.
- 2004–2015, 2201–2215 New Flyer Xcelsior (40' ft) added 2020-22.
- 2301-2362 New Flyer Xcelsior 60-foot battery electric buses; mainly used for BRT service.

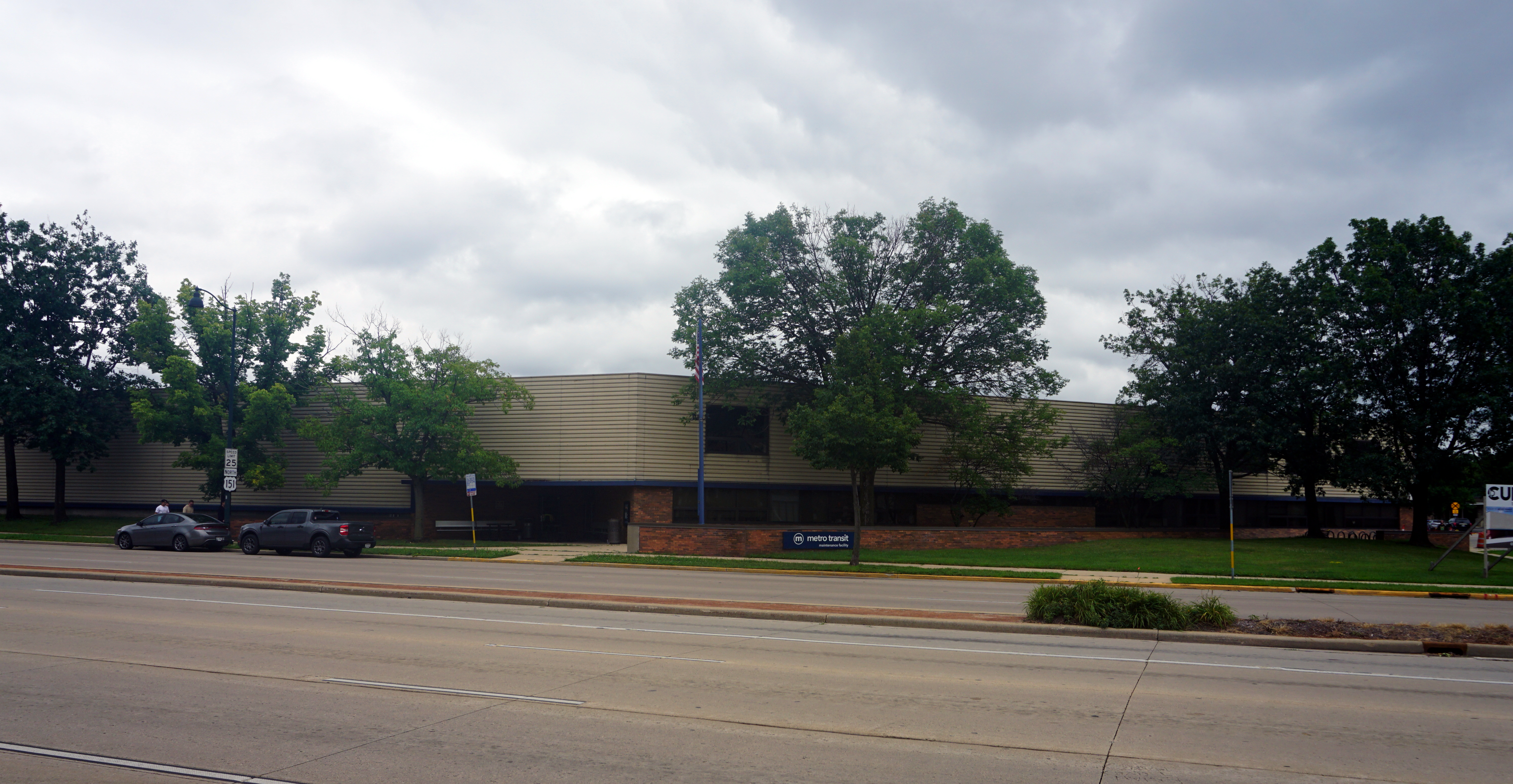
Metro Transit headquarters and maintenance facility.

=== Retired fleet ===
- 422-445 Saab-Scania CN112CLU
- 446-556 OBI Orion
- 557-719 Gillig Phantom
- 800–875 New Flyer D40LF
- Majority between 876–950 Gillig Low Floor

== Ridership ==
Year	Ridership	Change over previous year
2014	15,223,961	▲1.48%
2015	14,358,261	▼5.68%
2016	13,305,291	▼7.33%
2017	12,817,077	▼3.67%
2018	13,230,698	▲3.23%
2019	12,856,514	▼2.83%
2020	4,693,426	▼63.49%
2021	5,390,018	▲14.84%
2022	8,287,021	▲53.75%
2023	9,403,885	▲13.48%
2024	9,176,868	▼3.55%
2025	12,300,000	▲34.03%

== Gallery ==
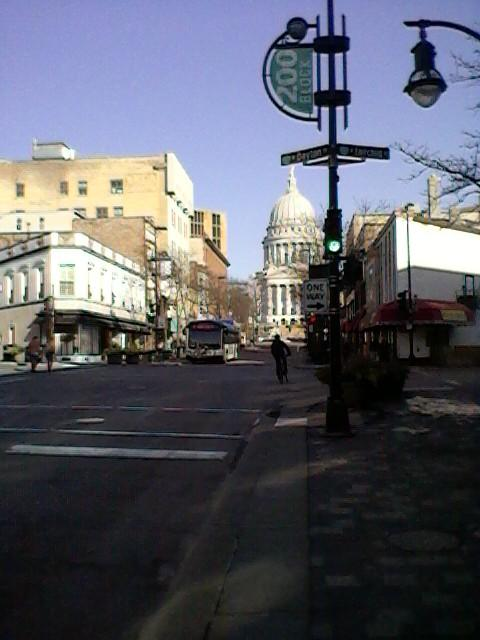
Metro bus on State Street

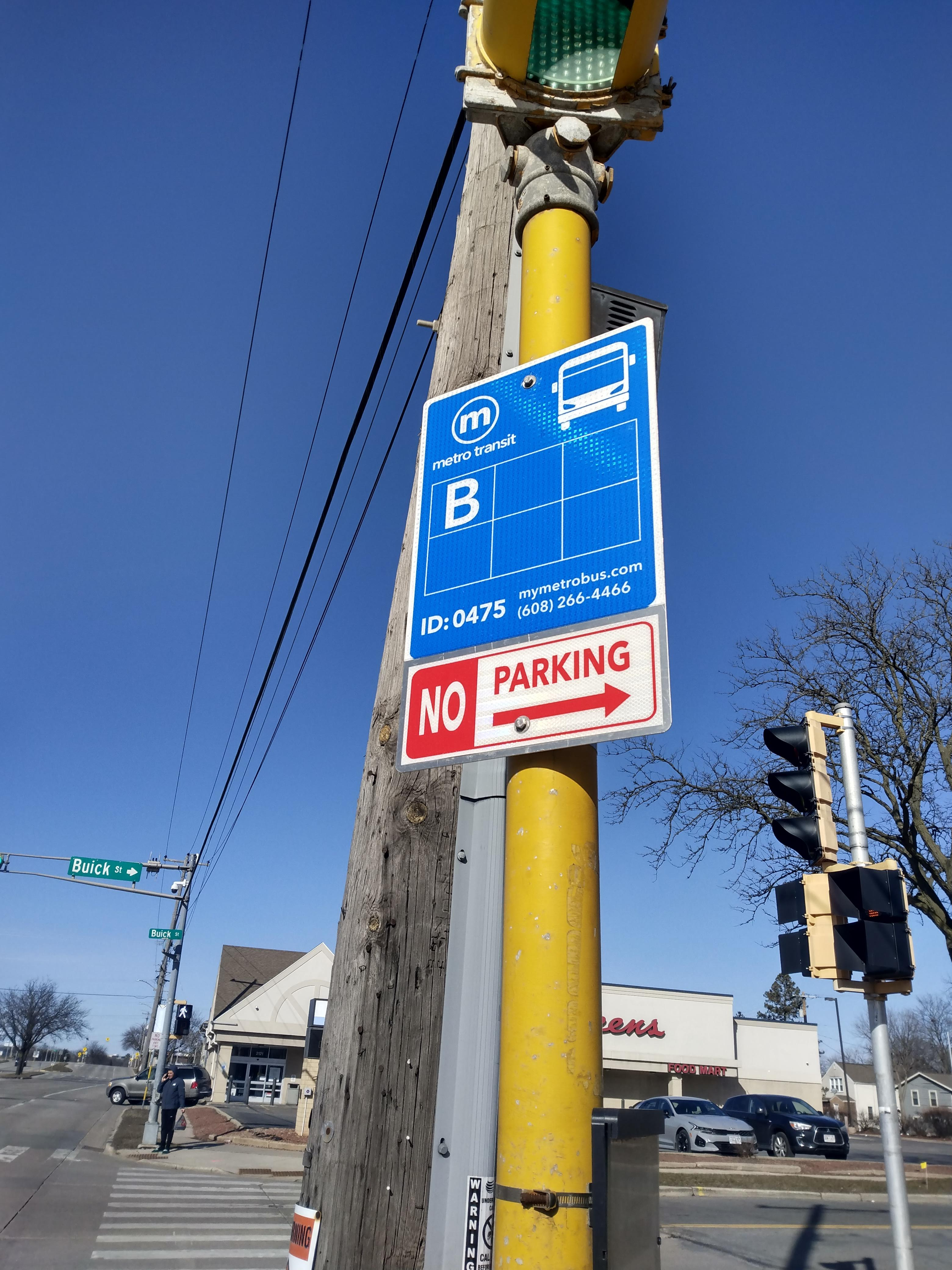
A Metro bus stop sign

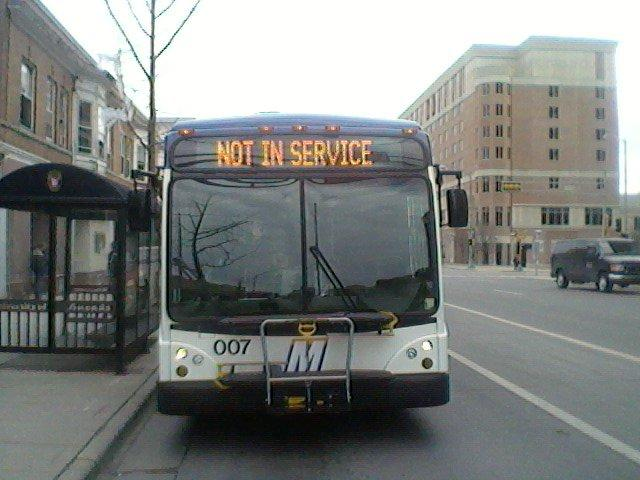
The front of a Metro Gillig BRT hybrid bus

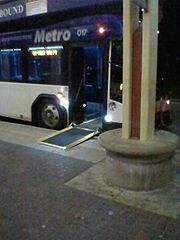
A hybrid bus with its accessibility ramp extended

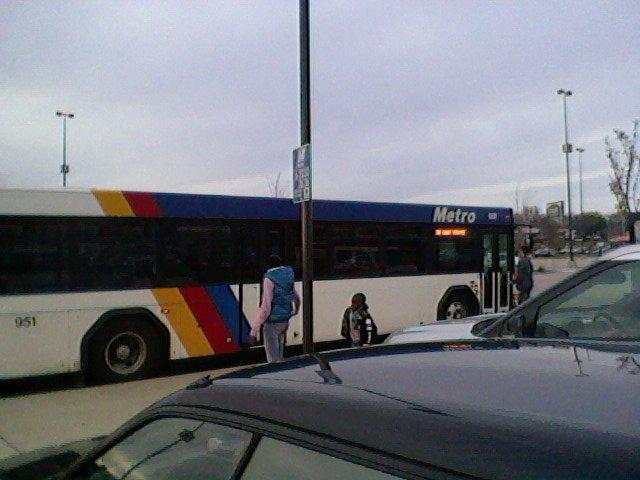
A bus at East Towne Mall in 2011

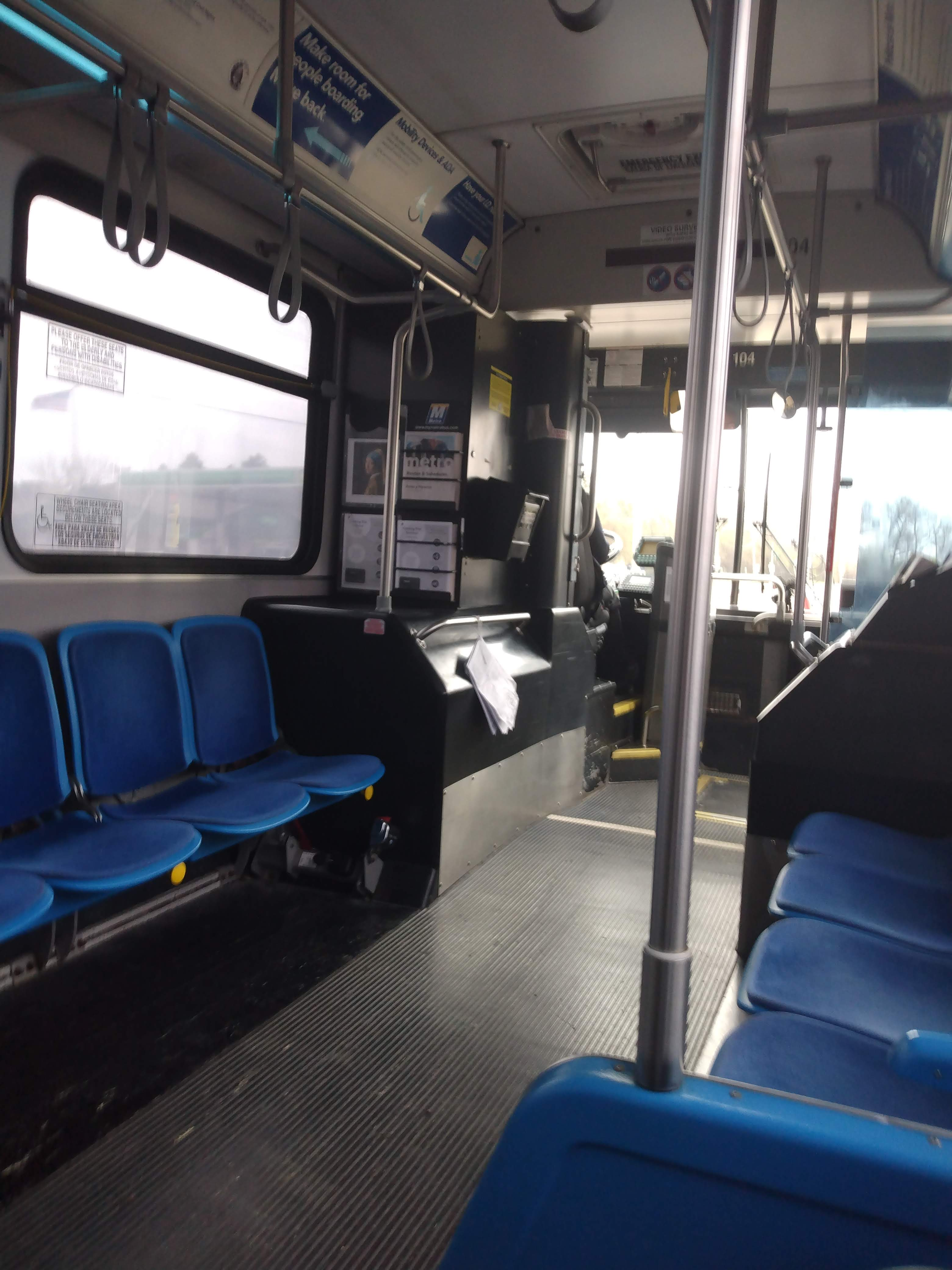
The inside of a Metro bus

== See also ==
- Badger Bus
- Janesville Transit System
- MCTS
