= Iowa City–North Liberty commuter rail =

Canceled hybrid rail service in Iowa

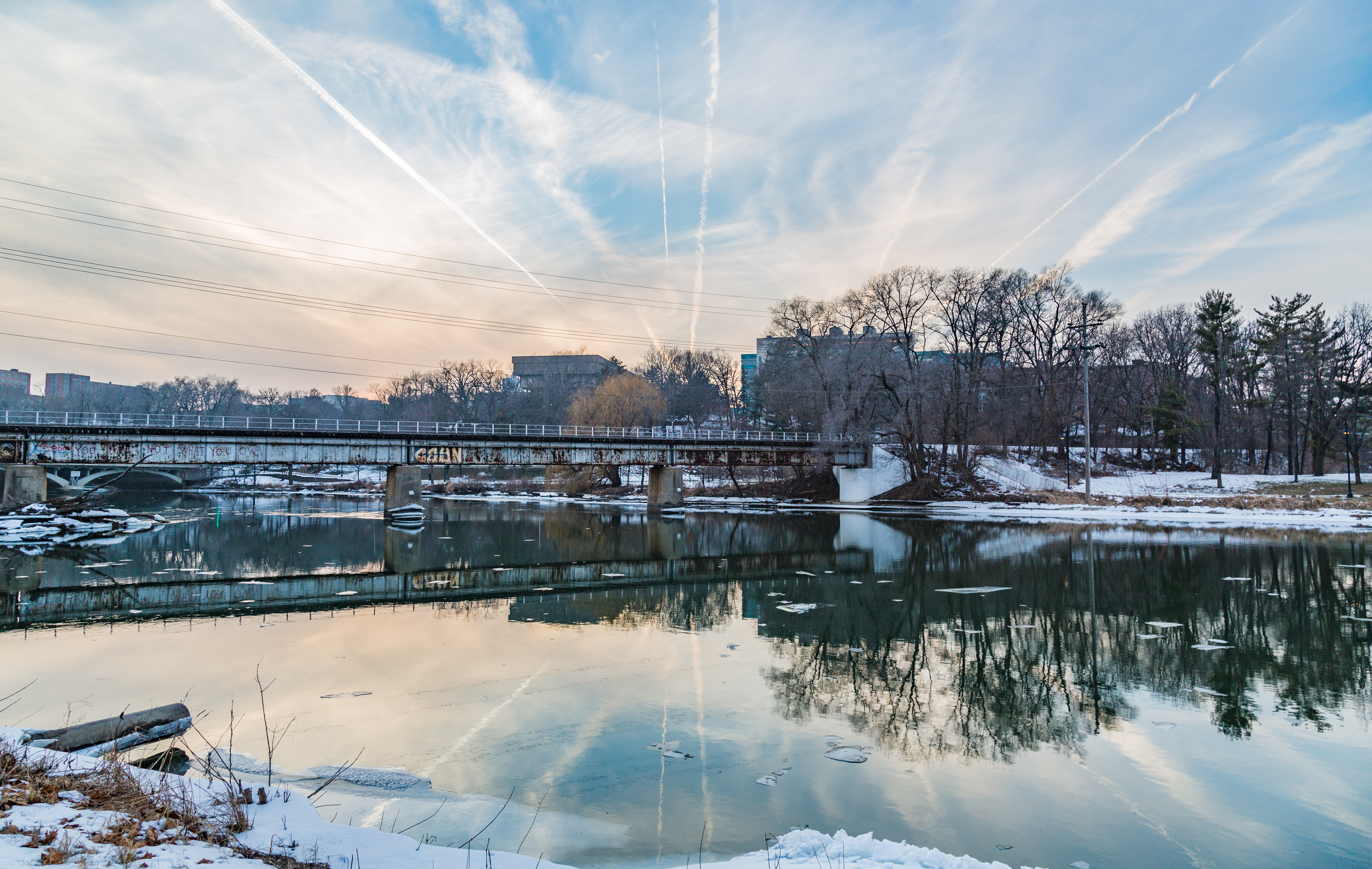
- Proposed rail alignment near the University of Iowa campus

Overview
- Service type: Hybrid rail
- Status: Canceled
- Locale: Johnson County, Iowa
- Predecessor: Cedar Rapids and Iowa City Railway (interurban service)
- Current operator: Cedar Rapids and Iowa City Railway (shortline freight service)

Route
- Termini: Iowa City; North Liberty
- Stops: 7
- Average journey time: 30 minutes (proposed)
- Service frequency: 45-minute headways (proposed)

Technical
- Rolling stock: British Rail Class 230 (proposed)
- Track gauge: 4 ft 8 1/2 in (1,435 mm) standard gauge
- Electrification: Onboard lithium-ion battery
- Operating speed: 60 mph (95.6 km/h)
- Average length: 8.2 miles (13.2 km)
- Track owner: Cedar Rapids and Iowa City Railway

Iowa City–North Liberty commuter rail was a proposal for a hybrid rail service in Johnson County, Iowa, that aimed to reintroduce passenger rail service along an 8.2-mile (13.2 km) segment of the Cedar Rapids and Iowa City Railway (CRANDIC) corridor. The line would have connected North Liberty, Coralville, and the University of Iowa campus in Iowa City. In 2026, the preferred alternative called for a "Pop-Up Metro" pilot service that would have utilized British Rail Class 230 battery-electric multiple units (BEMUs) repurposed from former London Underground D78 Stock.

Conceptual planning for the project began in the early 2010s, with renewed focus emerging in 2024 when the Railroad Development Corporation (RDC) proposed its Pop-Up Metro concept to Johnson County officials. Previous alternatives included conventional passenger rail and bus rapid transit. A three-year pilot program was anticipated to launch by 2026 pending funding and approvals. Although classified as commuter rail within service proposals, the project aligned more closely with the Federal Railroad Administration's definition of hybrid rail due to its use of lightweight, self-powered rolling stock and its focus on shorter-distance regional service.

In January 2025, the Iowa City-North Liberty Commuter Rail project was canceled after CRANDIC refused to lease trackage for passenger service on their corridor.

== Background ==
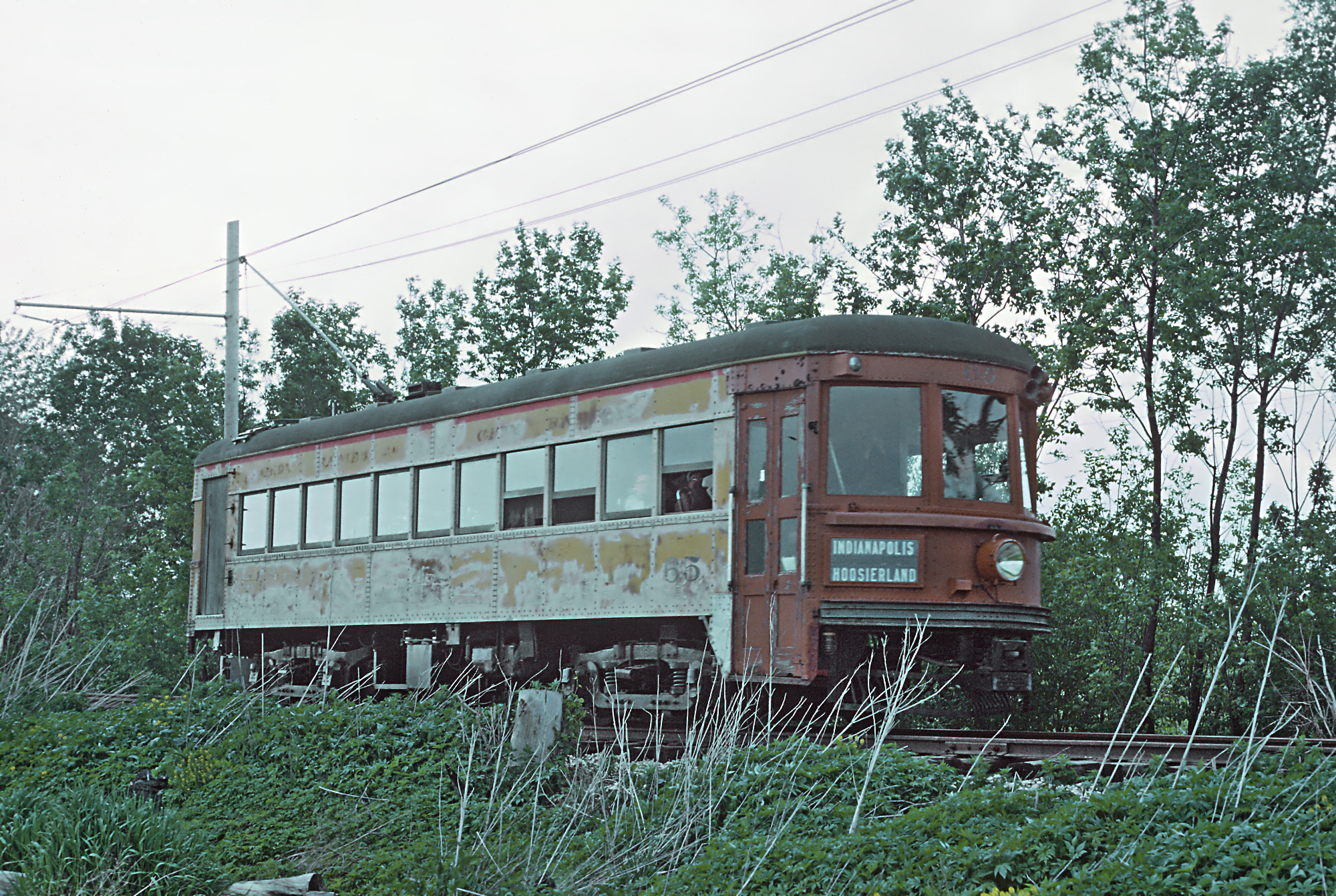
Former Cedar Rapids and Iowa City Railway interurban car

The Cedar Rapids and Iowa City Railway was established in 1904 to provide interurban passenger rail service between Cedar Rapids and Iowa City. Passenger service ceased in 1953 due to declining ridership as automobiles and highways became the preferred modes of travel. Since then, the corridor has been used exclusively for freight service. Interest in reintroducing passenger rail service emerged in the early 2010s as Johnson County experienced population growth and increasing traffic congestion. A 2012 regional transportation planning study highlighted the need for alternative transit solutions, including the potential for rail-based services along the CRANDIC corridor. A feasibility study in 2015 identified the CRANDIC corridor as a potential route for commuter rail. Future studies assessed additional alternatives; in 2018 the line was studied for rail trail conversion, in 2020 conventional commuter rail was studied, and in early 2024 the line was studied for conversion into a paved busway.

Interest in passenger service was renewed in 2024 when the Railroad Development Corporation presented a "Pop-Up Metro" pilot service, which proposed using battery-electric trains on existing infrastructure for a lower capital cost. As proposed, the Pop-Up Metro concept was developed as a low-cost and flexible solution for testing commuter rail viability in areas that lack existing rail transport; it is designed to repurpose existing freight rail lines for passenger service using battery-electric multiple units with minimal infrastructure and expedited implementation. The RDC proposes that Pop-Up Metro avoids the need for costly infrastructure upgrades such as full electrification; instead, it relies on trains equipped with onboard battery systems capable of recharging at strategically placed charging stations. Despite this, the Pop-Up Metro concept has not been adopted by any transit agencies for revenue service, nor have service pilots occurred.

In August 2024, representatives from Iowa City, Coralville, North Liberty, and Johnson County traveled to Rockhill Furnace, Pennsylvania, to experience the Pop-Up Metro demonstration firsthand. Following this visit, local stakeholders expressed strong interest in pursuing the project as a pilot program; approval for the Pop-Up Metro was formalized in December 2024 when the Johnson County Board of Supervisors adopted a resolution supporting the Iowa City-North Liberty Commuter Rail as a pilot project. The other two alternatives, conventional rail and bus rapid transit, were deemed less favorable due to increased capital expenditure (estimated at $60 million and $87.4 million respectively). The estimated cost for the three-year pilot program was $5.7 million, with annual operating costs projected at $3.7 million. Funding was expected from local governments, federal grants, and public-private partnerships.

== Proposed service ==
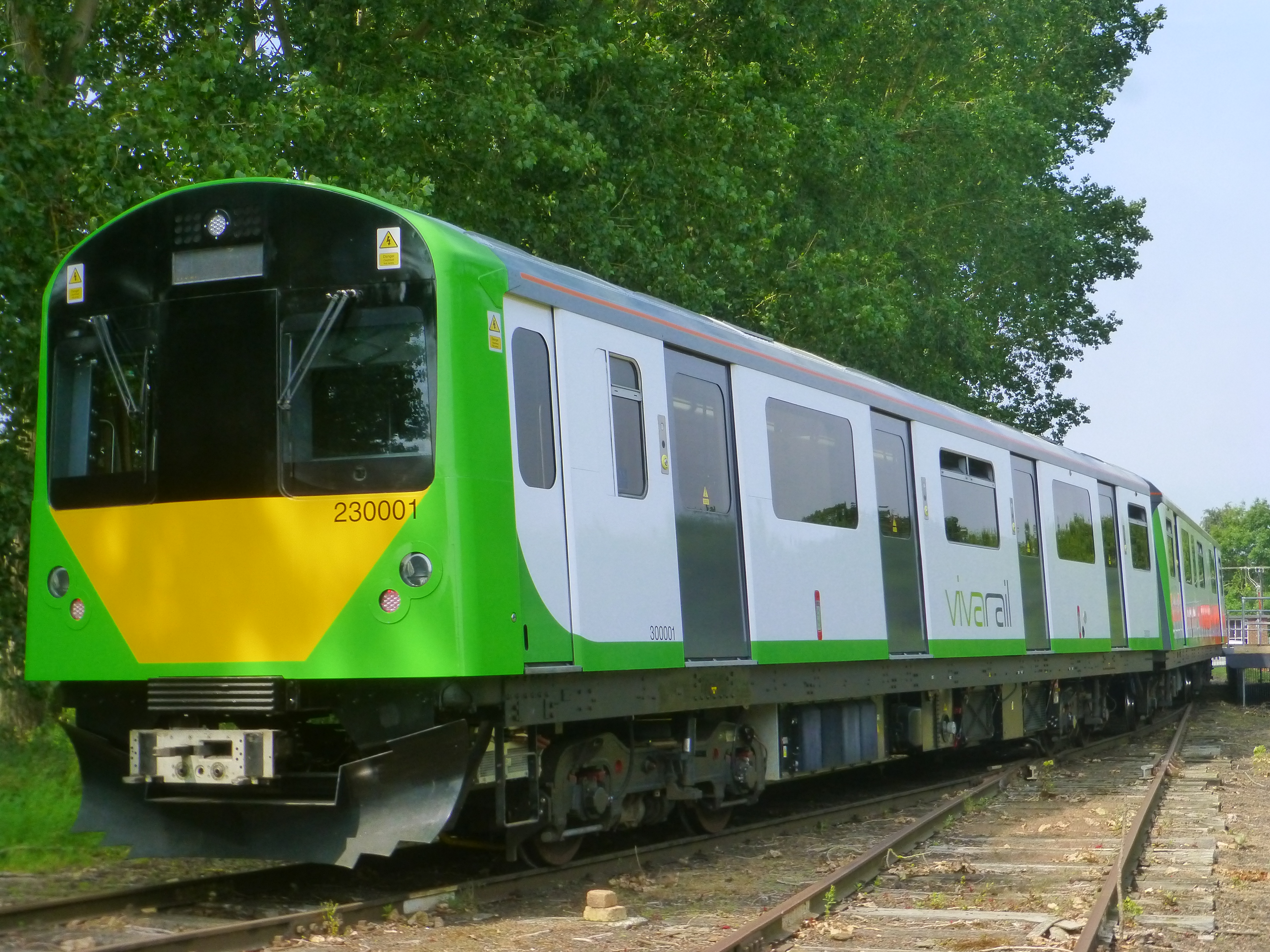
The British Rail Class 230 was planned for revenue service. Pictured is a Vivarail prototype unit in 2017.

As proposed, the Iowa City-North Liberty Commuter Rail would have operated along an 8.2 miles (13.2 km) segment of the CRANDIC line that is currently used exclusively for shortline freight service, with stops planned in North Liberty, Coralville, and downtown Iowa City by 2026. Several intermediate stations were planned; however, locations were not determined. The project included upgrades to infrastructure such as charging stations, a light maintenance facility, grade crossing upgrades, and temporary high-level platforms. The RDC owns two British Rail Class 230 trainsets acquired from Vivarail that are stored at the Rockhill Trolley Museum in Pennsylvania; Vivarail specialized in producing battery-electric, diesel-electric and hybrid trains for the United Kingdom market but ceased operations in 2023. If the pilot was funded, the Class 230 would be implemented for pilot Iowa City-North Liberty service. Specific station sites had not been identified.

Upon the establishment of an operational entity for the service, a leasing agreement for use of the CRANDIC line would have been pursued. Pilot service would have operated with 45 minute bidirectional headways Monday through Friday between 6 AM and 9 PM; end-to-end travel time is estimated at 30 minutes, with a total of six stations. The Class 230 units are not compliant with FRA Tier-1 crashworthiness standards, prohibiting mixed operations with conventional rail. Service would have operated under a shared-use waiver from the FRA based on temporal separation under the condition that the two modes (shortline freight and passenger) are kept separate by assignment of specific blocks of time to each mode. Under this provision, the service would have been classified as hybrid rail, which the FRA defines as a form of light rail transit. Modular ADA compliant high-level platforms would be implemented at station sites.

The route would have been the following stations, from south to north:

Iowa City-North Liberty commuter rail stops
Station	Community	Location	Connections & notes
Dubuque Street	Iowa City	on Lafayette Street and Dubuque Street	Iowa City Transit: routes 1, 13
Burlington Street	Iowa City	on Burlington Street and Front Street	Iowa City Transit: routes 1, 5, 8, 12, 13
University of Iowa, West Campus	Iowa City	near Newton Road and Riverside Drive	Cambus: route 34
Iowa River Landing	Coralville	near 1st Avenue and Pipeline Road	380 Express Cambus: route 34 Coralville Transit: routes 20, 22, 23, 24, 25
University of Iowa, Oakdale Campus	Coralville	near Crosspark Road	Cambus: route 34
West Penn Street	North Liberty	near Dubuque Street	

== Project cancelation ==
On January 31, 2025, Johnson County officials received notice that CRANDIC would not allow use of the line for passenger transit, in turn indefinitely precluding all Pop-Up Metro plans. CRANDIC cited freight interference, liability, and regulatory uncertainties as reasoning to reject proposals for passenger transit use on the corridor. There are no plans to further pursue Iowa City-North Liberty Commuter Rail.

== See also ==
- Hybrid Rail
- Commuter rail in North America
- Railroad Development Corporation
