= Cambus (disambiguation) =

Cambus is a bus service for the University of Iowa.

Cambus may also refer to:.

- Cambus, Clackmannanshire, a village in Scotland
- Stagecoach in Cambridge, a bus company in Cambridge, England; trading name of Cambus Ltd
