= Vivarail =

Rolling stock manufacturer

- Industry: Rolling stock manufacturer
- Founded: 2012
- Fate: Administration as of 1 December 2022
- Headquarters: Southam, England
- Key people: Adrian Shooter (Managing Director)
- Products: D-Train
- Owner: Railroad Development Corporation
- Website: www.vivarail.co.uk

Vivarail was a British rolling stock manufacturer, founded in 2012 and based in Southam, Warwickshire. Vivarail's main project was the conversion of retired London Underground D78 Stock into two new classes for National Rail services. It was led by former Chiltern Railways chairman Adrian Shooter; the American Railroad Development Corporation was a shareholder.

In November 2022, the company entered into administration. Assets of Vivarail have been purchased by train operating company GWR. GWR bought intellectual property, rolling stock and equipment relating to the development of high-performance battery and Fast Charge technology to continue Vivarail's work in these areas. The technology was successfully trialled on the Greenford branch line.

== Diesel and battery units ==
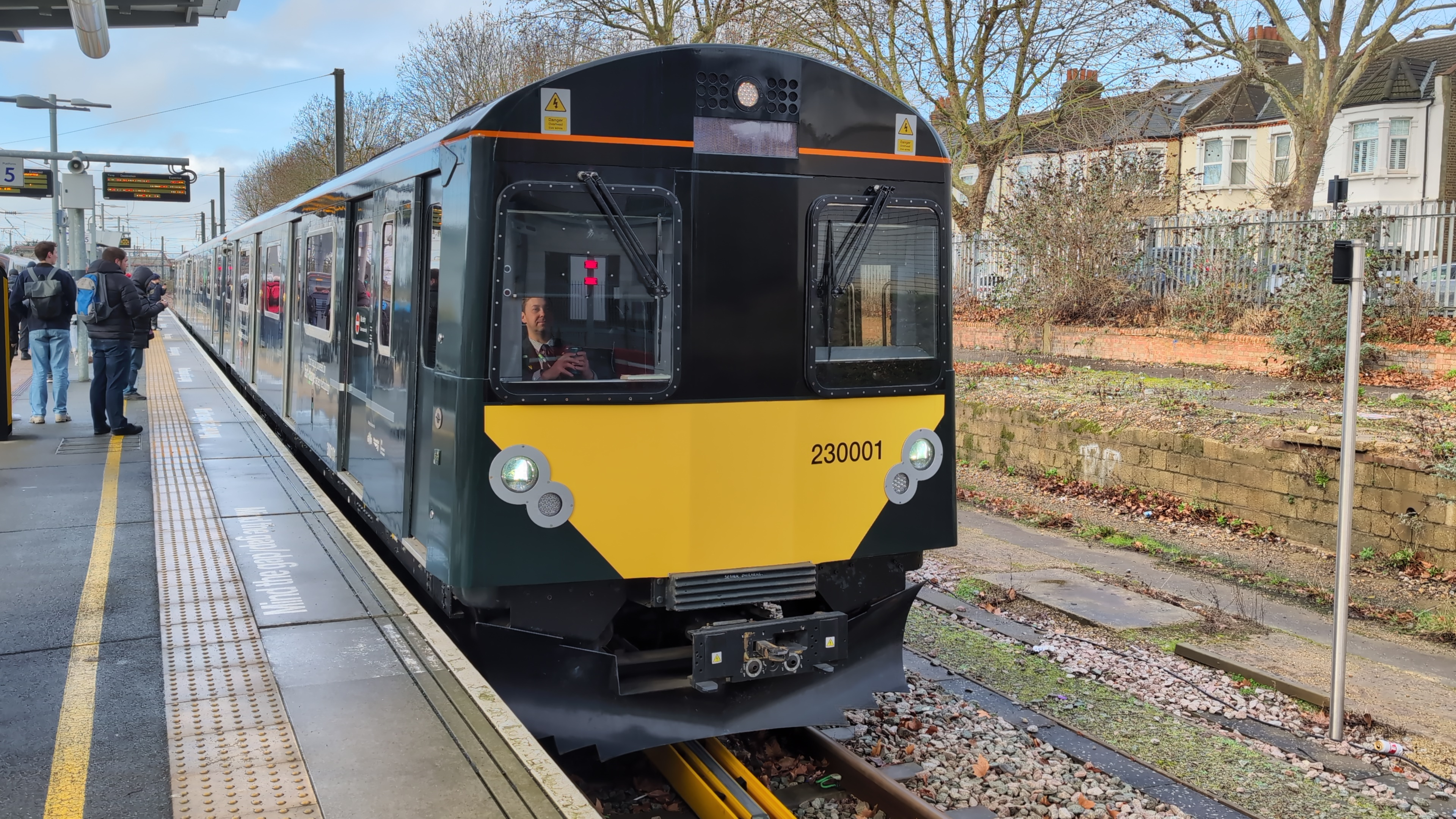
Great Western Railway 230001 in 2026

In November 2014, Vivarail bought 156 driving motor cars and 70 carriages of ex London Underground D78 Stock which were being replaced by S Stock. The stated purpose of the Class 230 is to ameliorate a perceived shortage of affordable, modern rolling stock on Britain's regional rail routes, resulting from the slow pace of electrification.

== Electric units ==
Other units retain their electric capability as they have been re-engineered into Class 484 units for use on the Island Line.

== Demise ==
The company announced its intention to appoint administrators in November 2022, and entered administration on 1 December 2022, less than two weeks before Shooter's death. Its Class 230 trains were temporarily withdrawn from passenger service on the Marston Vale line by London Northwestern Railway the same day.

The business is currently being wound down and has ceased trading. In February 2023, assets including rolling stock and intellectual property rights were purchased by train operator GWR, which also employed nine Vivarail staff to continue the preparation of its Class 230 for trial. A number of assets were also purchased by incumbent operator Transport for Wales Rail in February 2023.

== Pop-Up Metro ==
In addition to Vivarail, another RDC subsidiary, Pop-Up Metro, has been promoting the Class 230 in the United States, as a vehicle to be used on hybrid rail lines. In 2021, two Class 230s were bought by Pop-Up Metro for demonstration in the US. These two trainsets have been demonstrated at the Rockhill Trolley Museum.

Pop-Up Metro technology had been proposed for the Iowa City–North Liberty commuter rail, before that proposal was stalled in 2025.

More recently, two transit projects in Pennsylvania involve the Pop-Up Metro. In 2025, Pop-Up Metro proposed working with the Delaware River Waterfront Corporation (DRWC) to set up a waterfront transit line. Meanwhile, SEPTA plans to use Pop-Up Metro equipment to restore passenger service on the line between Wawa Station and West Chester.

As of 2025, RDC is partnering with another company, TDI Greenway, to promote Pop-Up Metro technology.
