= Iowa City Transit =

Mass transit agency in Iowa City

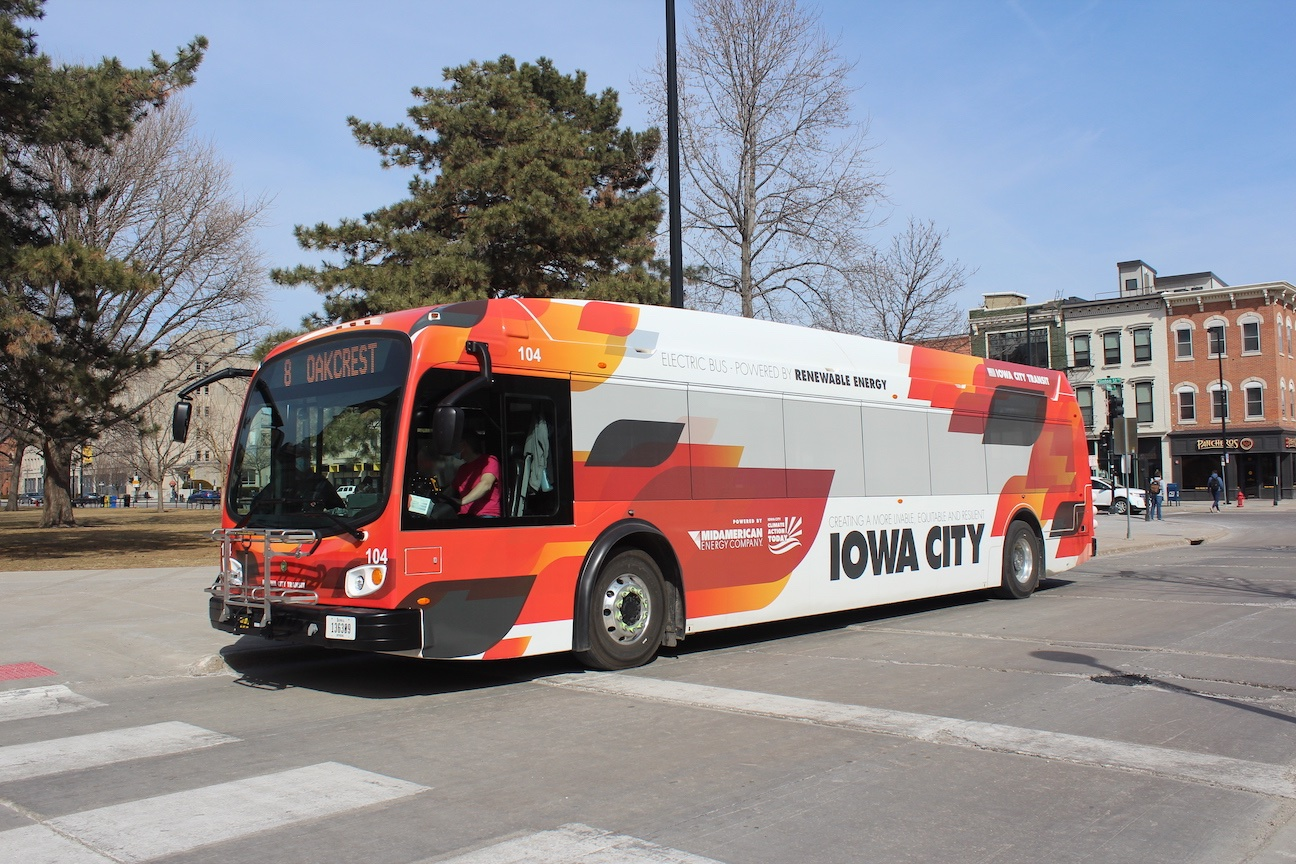
- Iowa City Transit #104, a Proterra ZX5 electric bus.
- Headquarters: 1200 South Riverside Drive, Iowa City, IA 52246 United States
- Locale: Iowa City, IA United States
- Service area: Iowa City/University Heights
- Service type: Transit bus
- Routes: 13
- Hubs: 1 (Iowa City Downtown Interchange)
- Fleet: 27
- Fuel type: Diesel, Electric
- Chief executive: Darian Nagle-Gamm
- Website: Iowa City Transit

Iowa City Transit is an American public transit system serving Iowa City, Iowa. The service provides several routes serving various areas of the city as well as University Heights, originating and terminating at the Iowa City Downtown Interchange. In addition, a loop route is provided for school students at the beginning and end of each school day. In addition to Iowa City Transit, Coralville Transit, the University of Iowa Cambus, and the 380 Express also provide transit service in the Iowa City area, and Iowa City Transit shares several bus stops with them.

== Routes ==
Iowa City Transit operates 13 routes, all of which originate and terminate at the Iowa City Downtown Interchange except for route 3 (Eastside Loop). Prior to August 2, 2021, Iowa City Transit operated 26 unnumbered routes, and several of the current routes are identical to those in the previous system. Some routes are interlined, which means that once a bus completes its route and returns to the Downtown Interchange, it will change to a different route. All routes operate from Monday to Saturday, with reduced service on evenings and Saturdays. This is in contrast to the previous system, where only a select number of routes operated a modified route for evenings and Saturdays. There is no service on Sundays and holidays.

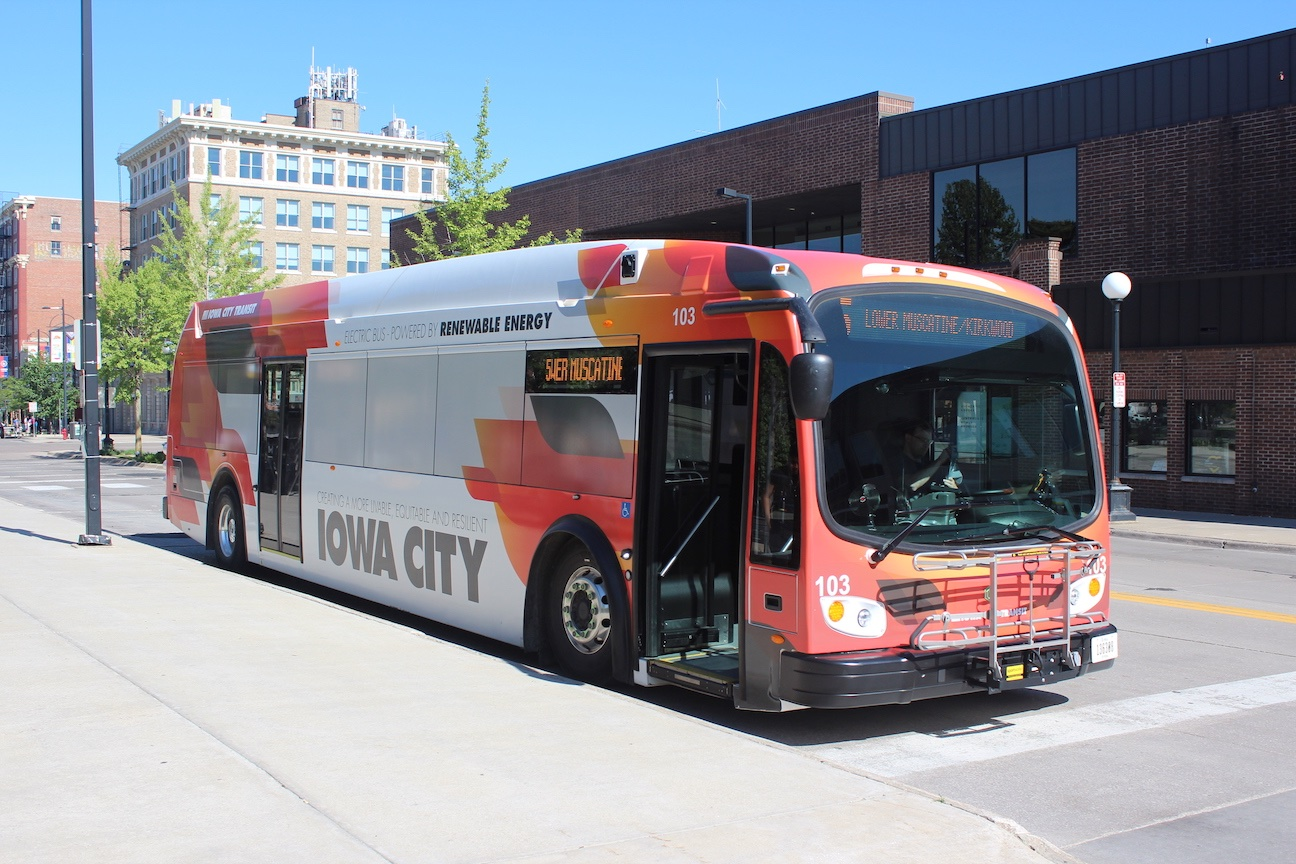
Route 5 at Downtown Interchange.

=== Route list ===
№	Name	Notes
1	South Iowa City	
2	Court Street	
3	Eastside Loop	Operates one AM trip 3A and one PM trip 3P coordinated with local schools. The AM and PM routes follow roughly the same route in opposite directions.; Does not stop at the Downtown Interchange.
5	Lower Muscatine/Kirkwood	
6	Peninsula	
7	North Dodge	ACT loop served during peak hours only.
8	Oakcrest	
9	Towncrest	
10	West Iowa City	Irving Avenue/Shannon Drive served during off-peak hours only.
11	Rochester	
12	Highway 1	
13	South Gilbert	

== Fares and Passes ==
Iowa City Transit has been fare free since August 1, 2023 as part of a two-year pilot program.

== Bus Tracking ==
Real-time bus tracking is available through the Transit app, which provides estimated arrival times at a bus stop and precise locations of buses on the map. The other two transit systems in the Iowa City area, Coralville Transit and Cambus, also use the Transit app. Prior to 2019, bus tracking for the Iowa City area transit systems was provided by BONGO (Bus on the Go).

== Court Street Transportation Center ==
The Court Street Transportation Center, located at 170 East Court Street, serves as a hub for Iowa City Transit and regional transit, with connections to the 380 Express and intercity buses. The facility, opened September 1, 2005, was designed to serve local and intercity buses, and include a child-care facility and parking ramp.

== Future Plans ==
Several plans for the Iowa City area transit systems were considered over the past few years as part of a multi-year transit study. Changes considered include service on Sundays, as well as the elimination of fares.

In early 2021, Iowa City Transit made plans to introduce four Proterra ZX5 electric buses to the fleet, replacing four existing diesel buses. A test bus operated briefly in the spring of 2021, and the four buses entered revenue service in January 2022. Following the bankruptcy of Proterra in 2023, replacement parts became increasingly difficult to obtain. By early 2025, all four electric buses had been removed from service while awaiting repairs, with no timeline for their return to operation. Iowa City Transit was awarded $23 million in federal funding to purchase four additional electric buses and construct a new transit facility to replace the existing facility built in 1984.

== Fleet ==
Fleet number(s)	Photo	Year	Manufacturer	Model	Notes
67-72		2010	Gillig	Low Floor 40'	Funded by the American Recovery and Reinvestment Act of 2009.
73-74		2012	Gillig	Low Floor 40'	
76-79		2017	Gillig	Low Floor 40'	Feature a redesigned livery.
80-86		2018	Gillig	Low Floor 40'	Feature a redesigned livery.

== See also ==
- List of bus transit systems in the United States
- Cambus
