= Cedar Rapids Transit =

Mass transit provider in Cedar Rapids, Iowa

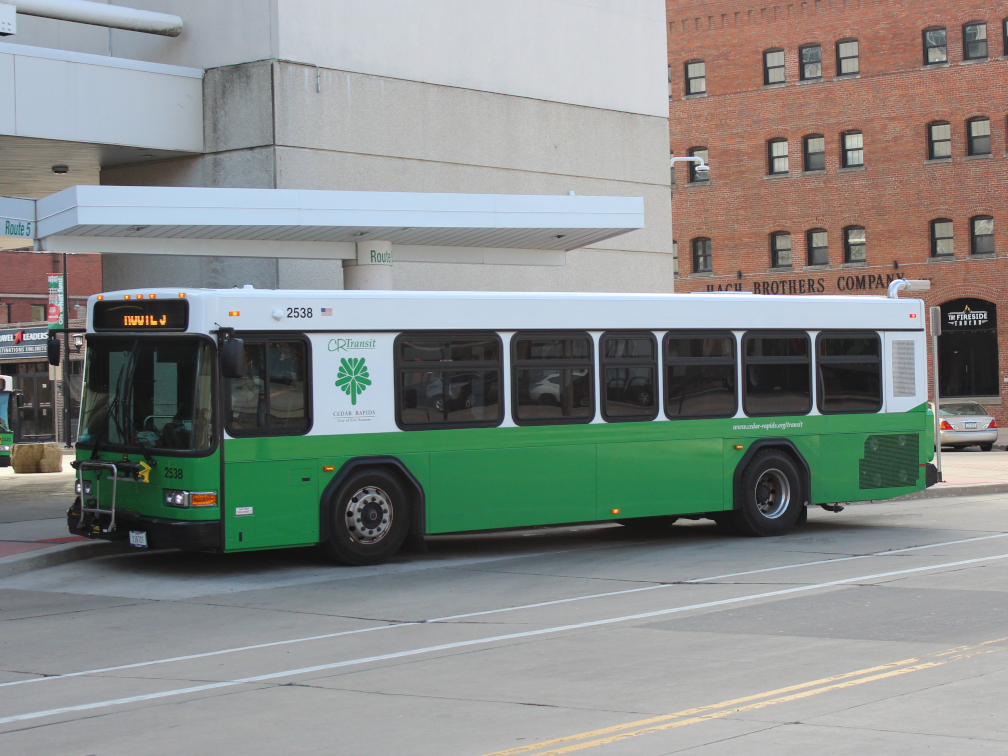
- Cedar Rapids Transit Gillig Low Floor bus.
- Headquarters: 427 8th Street NW
- Locale: Cedar Rapids, Iowa
- Service area: Linn County, Iowa
- Service type: bus service, paratransit
- Routes: 12
- Hubs: 1 (Ground Transportation Center)
- Fleet: 32
- Daily ridership: 2,691 (FY2023)
- Fuel type: Diesel
- Chief executive: Brad DeBrower
- Website: Official site

Cedar Rapids Transit, stylized as CR Transit, is the primary provider of mass transportation in Cedar Rapids, Iowa. Prior to 2008, the Cedar Rapids public transportation system was known as Environmental Alternative for a Greater Lifestyle (EAGL) from 1993 to 2008, and Easyrider prior to 1993. Twelve routes serve the city, with most radiating from the Ground Transportation Center in downtown Cedar Rapids, as well as two circulator routes. In addition to providing transit service, Cedar Rapids Transit also provides ADA Paratransit service to passengers with qualifying disabilities. The system runs Monday through Saturday. There is no service on Sundays.

== Routes ==
Cedar Rapids Transit operates 12 routes, 10 of which originate in downtown Cedar Rapids at the Ground Transportation Center. Additionally, there are two circulator routes that serve Marion and north Cedar Rapids/Hiawatha. Connections to the 380 Express are available at the Ground Transportation Center and at Kirkwood Community College.

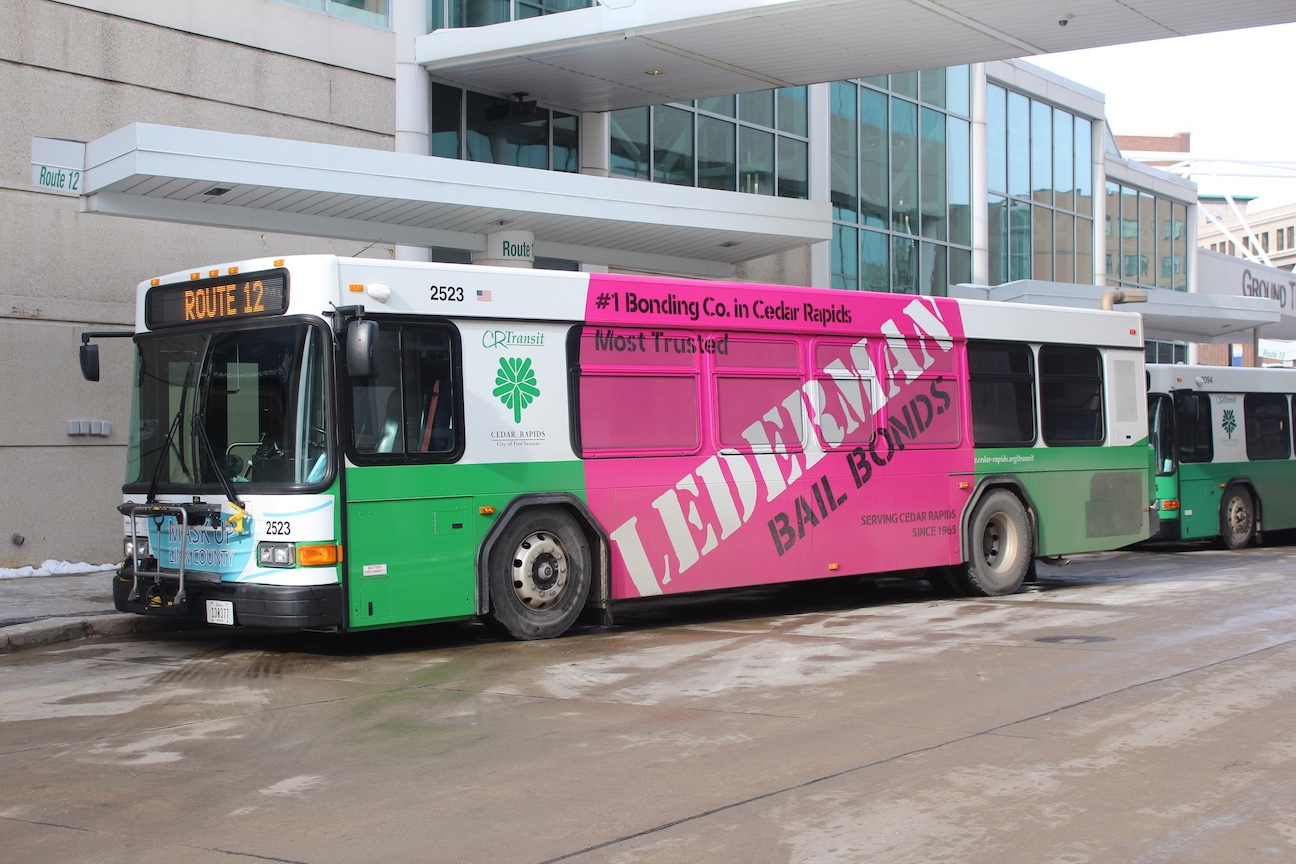
Route 12 at Ground Transportation Center.

=== Route list ===
№	Termini		Via	Notes
1	Downtown Cedar Rapids; Ground Transportation Center	Stoney Point Rd SW	Edgewood Rd NW, 8th Ave SW	
2	Downtown Cedar Rapids; Ground Transportation Center	42nd St SE	Mount Vernon Rd SE, Pioneer Ave SE	
3	Downtown Cedar Rapids; Ground Transportation Center	Rockwell Dr NE	Oakland Rd NE, Council St NE	
5	Downtown Cedar Rapids; Ground Transportation Center	Twixt Town Rd	1st Ave E, Collins Rd	
6	Downtown Cedar Rapids; Ground Transportation Center	Blairs Ferry Rd NE	42nd St NE, Center Point Rd NE	
7	Downtown Cedar Rapids; Ground Transportation Center	76th Ave SW	Bowling St SW, Kirkwood Pkwy SW	
8	Downtown Cedar Rapids; Ground Transportation Center	Wiley Blvd SW	Johnson Ave SW, West Post Rd SW	
10	Downtown Cedar Rapids; Ground Transportation Center	Beverly Rd	Williams Blvd SW, Edgewood Rd SW	
11	Downtown Cedar Rapids; Ground Transportation Center	Wright Brothers Blvd SW	6th St SW, 76th Ave SW	
12	Downtown Cedar Rapids; Ground Transportation Center	1st Ave W	33rd Ave SW, Wilson Ave SW	
20	Lindale Dr	Linn Aire Ave	6th Ave, McGowan Blvd	Marion Circulator
30	Twixt Town Rd	Tower Terrace Rd	Blairs Ferry Rd NE, Boyson Rd NE	NE Circulator

== Fare and Pass types ==
=== Single ride ===
Passenger
- Full Fare / Adults

Free:

- Students - CRCSD, Kirkwood, and Coe College
- Seniors
- Passengers with disabilities
- Medicare Passengers
- Income Based Passengers
- Children Ages 12 & Younger

=== Passes ===
Type
31 Day Pass
10 Ride Pass
Day Pass

== Bus Tracking ==
Bus tracking for Cedar Rapids Transit is available through Ride Systems, which shows all buses on a map with real-time location. The location of each bus is represented as an icon along with the bus number, and is color coded for different routes. Individual routes can also be selected to show the route path and stop locations.

== Ground Transportation Center ==
The Ground Transportation Center, located at 450 1st St SE, serves as the primary transfer point for Cedar Rapids Transit, with connections to the 380 Express as well. The facility opened November 7, 1983 at a cost of $28 million, which included the $9.5 million public portion and $18.5 million office tower and condominiums atop the structure. The design of the structure by Cannon Design also included dedicated space for intercity buses, and was originally served by Burlington Trailways, Greyhound Lines, and Jefferson Lines, however no intercity buses stop here as of 2023.

== Fleet ==
Fleet number(s)	Photo	Year	Manufacturer	Model	Notes
2441-2445		2011	Gillig	Low Floor 35'	
2451-2455		2012	Gillig	Low Floor 35'	
2481-2484		2014	Gillig	Low Floor 35'	
2501-2502		2017	Gillig	Low Floor 35'	
2511-2513		2018	Gillig	Low Floor 35'	
2521-2523		2019	Gillig	Low Floor 35'	Replaced the remaining ex-Omnitrans 1992 TMC RTS buses purchased in the fall of 2008, thus replacing the entire Cedar Rapids Transit fleet with new buses since the 2008 flood.
2531-2532		2021	Gillig	Low Floor 35'	
2533-2534		2022	Gillig	Low Floor 35'	
2535-2536		2023	Gillig	Low Floor 35'	
2537-2538		2025	Gillig	Low Floor 35'	

== See also ==
- List of bus transit systems in the United States
- Metropolitan Transit Authority of Black Hawk County
