= 380 Express =

Commuter service in Linn and Johnson Counties, Iowa

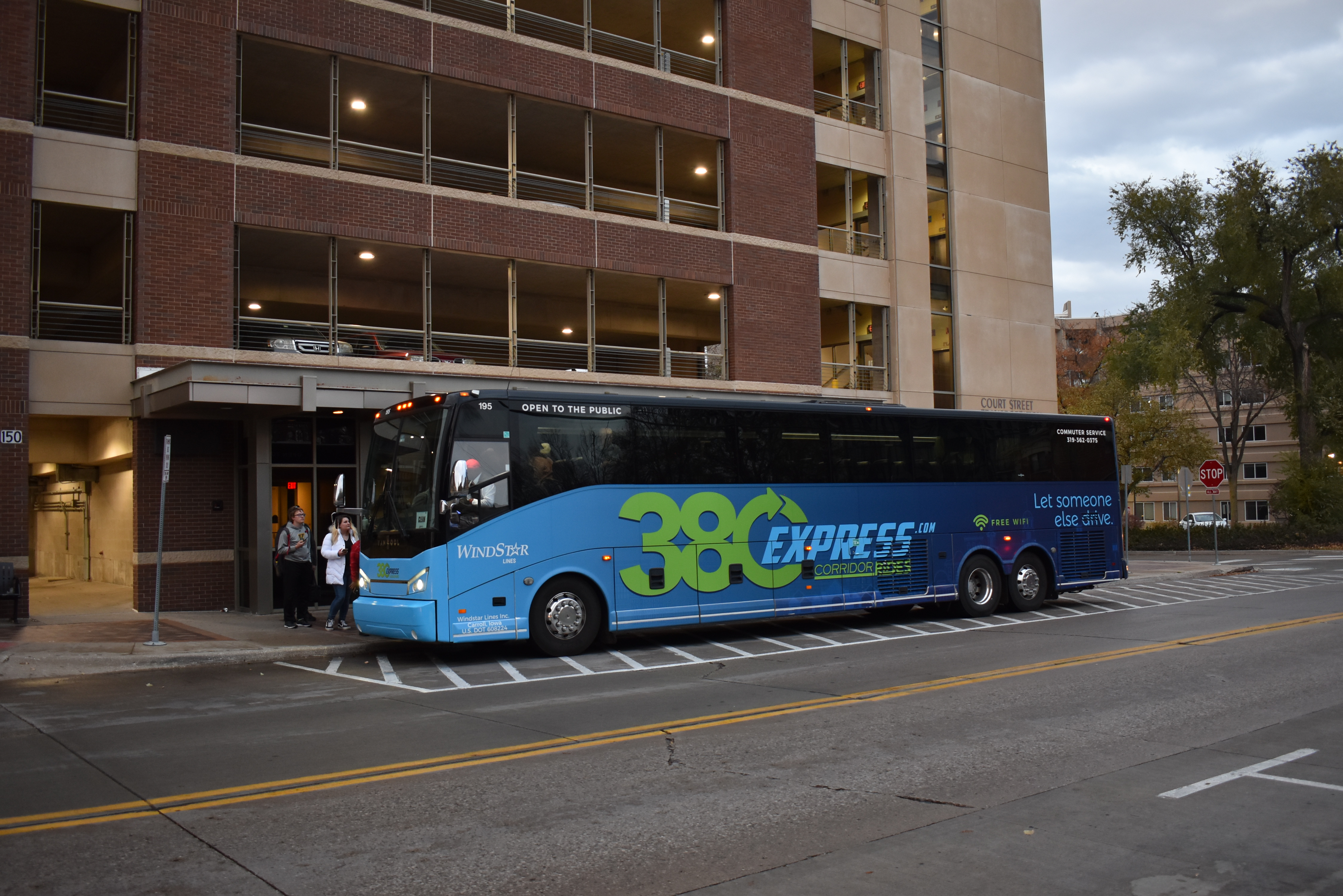
- A 380 Express bus in Iowa City
- Parent: East Central Iowa Council of Governments
- Headquarters: 5755 Willowcreek Drive SW
- Locale: Cedar Rapids, Iowa
- Service area: Johnson and Linn counties
- Service type: Commuter bus service
- Routes: 1
- Stops: 6
- Destinations: 2 (Cedar Rapids and Iowa City)
- Fleet: 7
- Annual ridership: 44,072 (2021)
- Operator: WindStar Lines
- Website: 380 Express

The 380 Express is a commuter bus service between Cedar Rapids and Iowa City. As of 2021, the system provided 44,072 rides over 11,264 annual vehicle revenue hours with 4 buses. The service is operated by Windstar Lines, which is contracted by the East Central Iowa Council of Governments (ECICOG).

== History ==
The 380 Express was begun on October 1, 2018, as a way to reduce congestion during a major roadway construction project around Iowa City. Service was only intended to continue for the duration of construction until 2025. Service began with weekday service, and from September to December 2019, Saturday service was added to the schedule. As of 2023, there is no long term funding source in place, leaving the future of the service in doubt, despite increasing ridership in 2022.

== Service ==
The 380 Express operates 22 roundtrips per day between Cedar Rapids and Iowa City along Interstate 380. In Cedar Rapids, the service connects with Cedar Rapids Transit at the downtown Ground Transportation Center, as well as at Kirkwood Community College. The service also connects with Coralville Transit at the Coralville Intermodal Center, and with Iowa City Transit, Cambus, and Burlington Trailways in downtown Iowa City.

Hours of operation for the system are Monday through Friday, with no service on the weekends. Regular fares are $4.00, with discounts for children, seniors and those with disabilities.

== Fleet ==
The 380 Express fleet consists of exclusively Windstar Lines-owned Van Hool coach buses. All coaches are equipped with free Wi-Fi, 120 V power outlets and USB ports, lavatory, and reclining seats with 3-point seat belts. The coaches are also equipped with a wheelchair lift with two wheelchair securement areas on each coach.

Fleet numbers	Photo	Year	Make	Model
194		2018	Van Hool	CX45
212, 271		2019-2021	Van Hool	CX45
280		2010s	Van Hool	CX35
323-325		2024	Van Hool	CX45

== Ridership ==
The ridership statistics shown here are of fixed route services only and do not include demand response services provided by the ECICOG.

== See also ==
- List of bus transit systems in the United States
- MET Transit
