= Hybrid rail =

Type of passenger rail service in the United States

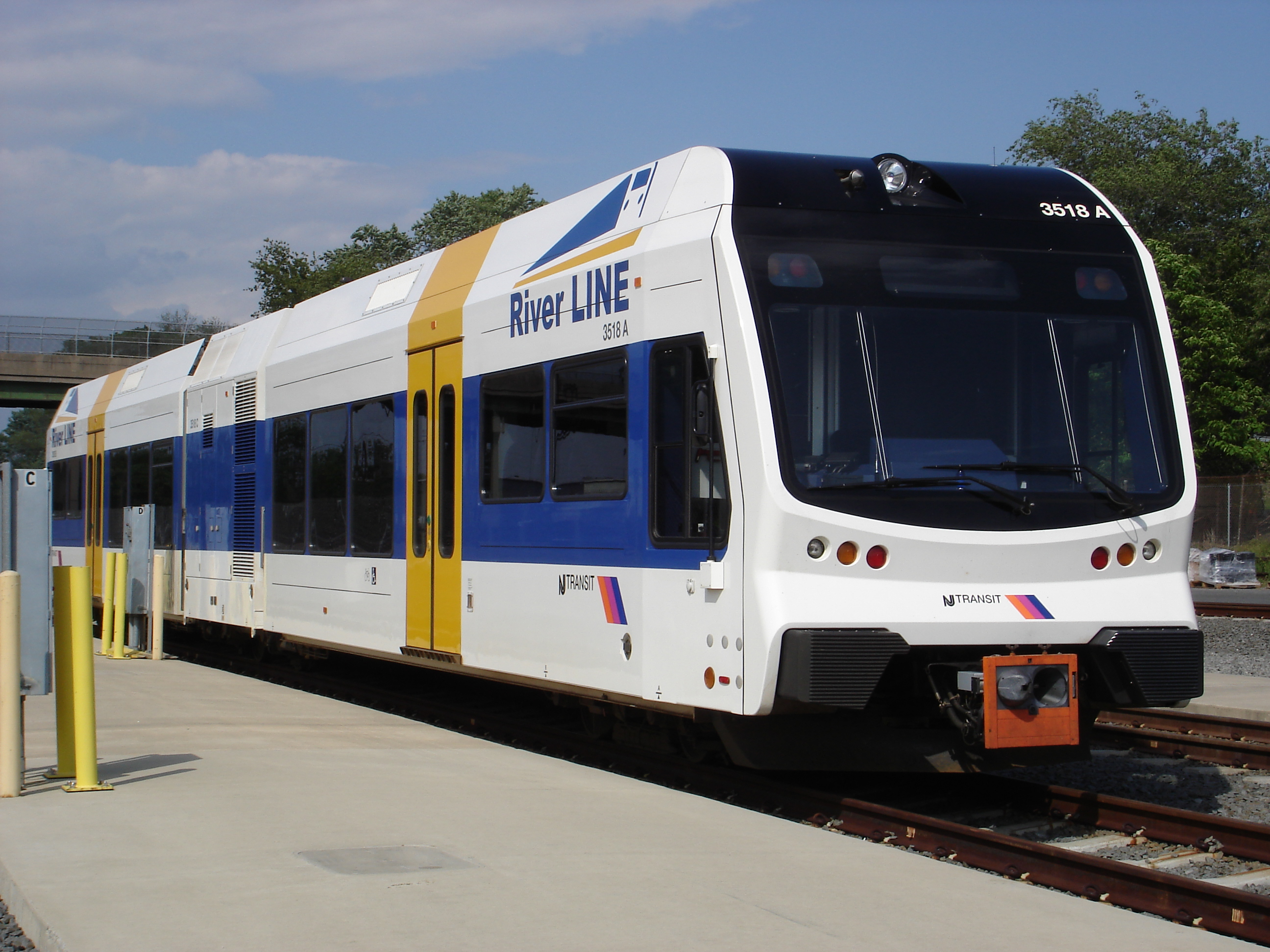
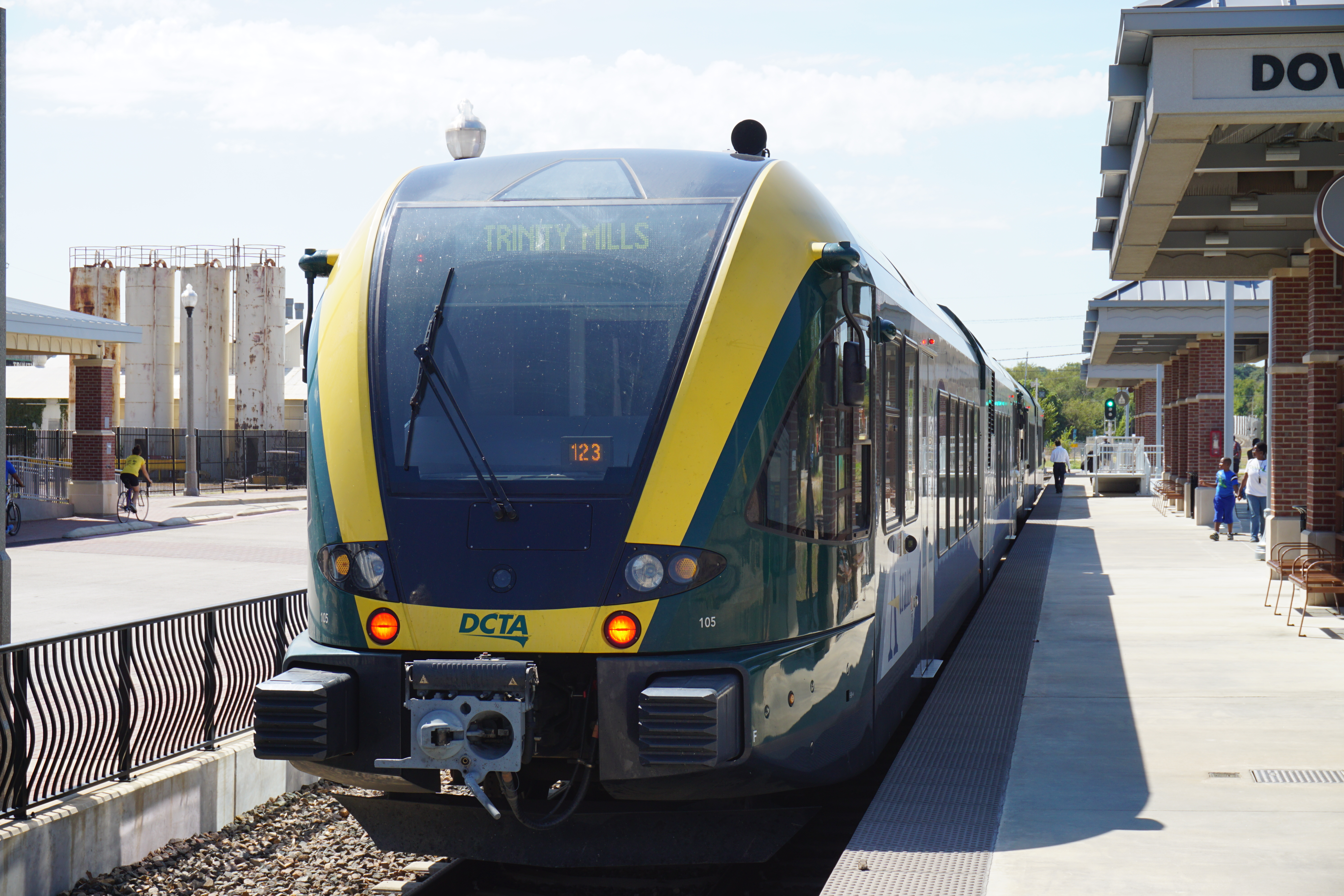
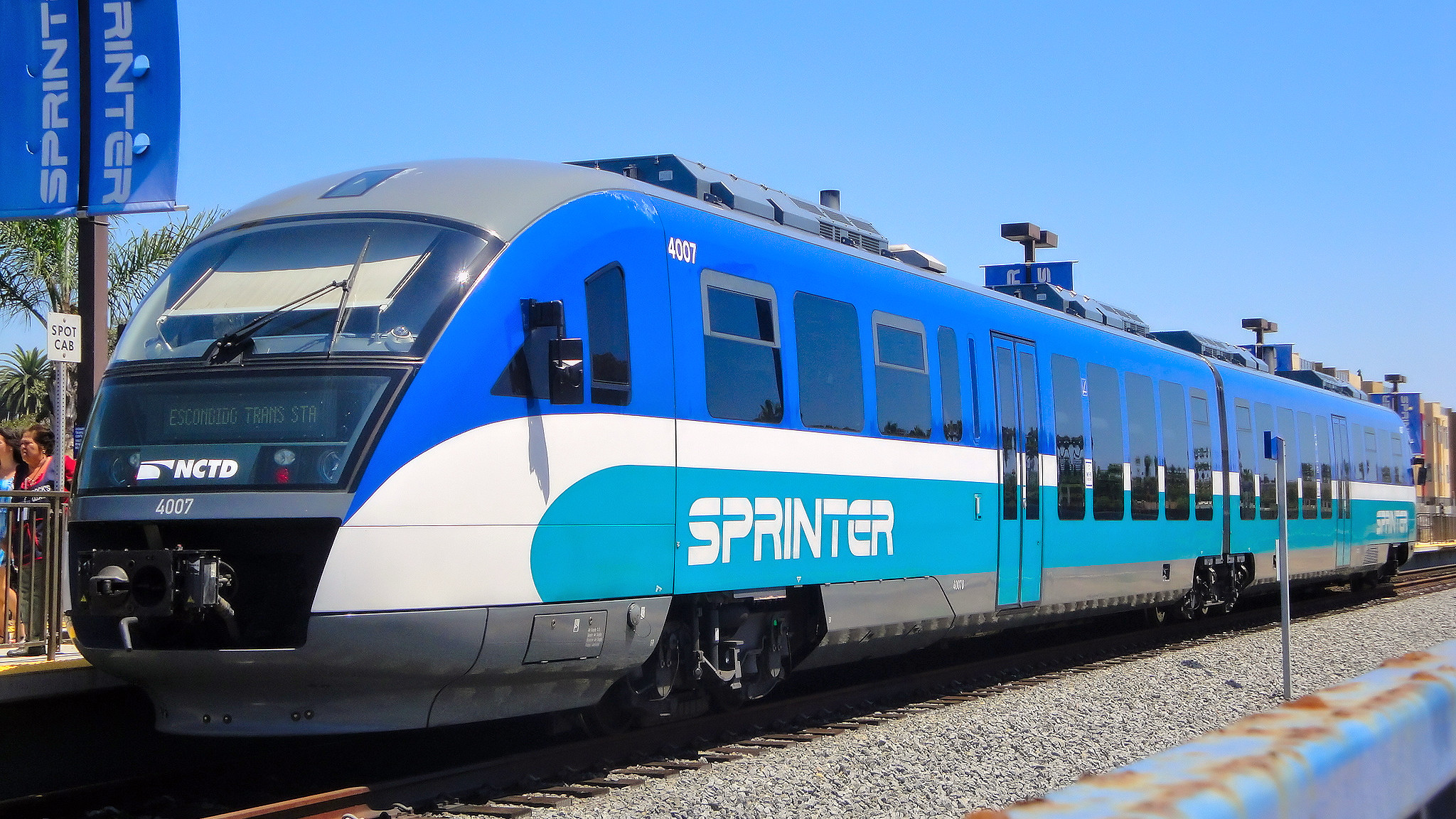
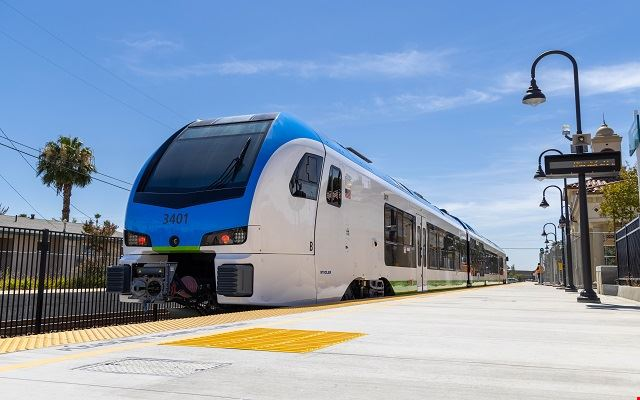
Clockwise from top left:
- River Line (South Jersey)
- A-train (Dallas–Fort Worth metroplex)
- Sprinter (northern San Diego County)
- Arrow (San Bernardino area)

Hybrid rail is a transit mode classification used in the United States for passenger rail services that operate on the national rail network but do not comply with Federal Railroad Administration (FRA) Tier I crashworthiness standards. These systems operate under FRA waivers or through temporal separation from freight trains, allowing the use of lighter, non-compliant diesel multiple units (DMUs) similar to those used in light rail or commuter rail systems.

Hybrid rail differs from conventional commuter rail because it offers frequent, all-day service rather than being limited to peak-period operations. However, service frequencies are generally lower than those of urban light rail systems, which typically operate on dedicated or semi-exclusive rights-of-way. Hybrid rail offers all-day rail service without the high capital costs of electrification or fully dedicated infrastructure.

The first hybrid rail service in the United States was NJ Transit's River Line, which began service in 2004. Since then, similar systems have been introduced in other regions, with several expansions and new projects currently planned or under development.

== Characteristics ==
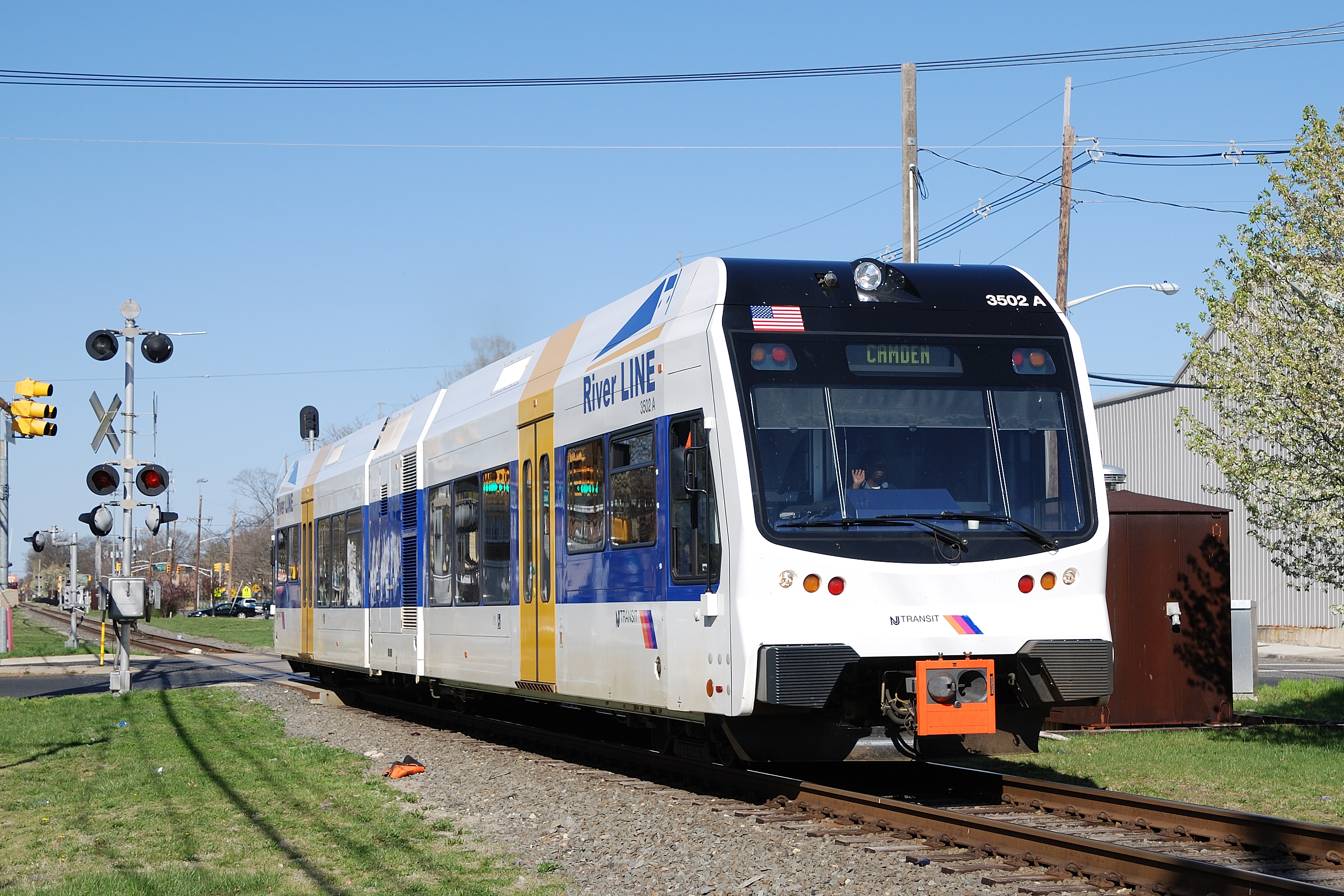
NJ Transit's River Line was the first hybrid rail service in the United States.

Hybrid rail combines technical and operational features associated with both light rail and commuter rail, but it remains distinct from either mode. The term "hybrid" derives from the convergence of both commuter and light rail operating characteristics. In practice, hybrid rail employs lightweight, self-propelled DMUs operating on existing freight rail infrastructure. The Federal Railroad Administration (FRA) classifies these services as operating with vehicles that do not meet Tier I crashworthiness standards, requiring temporal separation from freight traffic under shared-use agreements. This distinction is regulatory rather than service-based.

Despite this federal definition, some hybrid rail systems are legally or operationally classified as light rail by local or state transit agencies. For instance, NJ Transit's River Line and the Denton County Transportation Authority's (DCTA's) A-train in the Dallas–Fort Worth area both use FRA-regulated DMUs with temporal separation but are categorized as light rail in agency planning documents or funding mechanisms. This reflects a broader ambiguity in U.S. transit taxonomy (the way different rail modes are categorized), where service classification may be influenced more by local policy or funding frameworks than by regulatory compliance. The result is a hybrid designation that straddles technical, regulatory, and branding distinctions.

Hybrid rail is typically deployed in corridors with moderate demand, limited capital budgets, or geographic constraints that make full electrification or dedicated rights-of-way impractical. The ability to operate on existing freight corridors reduces infrastructure costs and makes hybrid rail suitable for a range of applications; these include suburban shuttles (e.g., Austin's CapMetro Rail and eBART in eastern Contra Costa County, California), interurban-style services (e.g., the River Line in New Jersey), and low-density regional corridors. In many cases, hybrid rail serves as a lower-cost alternative to light rail or traditional commuter rail in low to medium-demand corridors.

== History ==
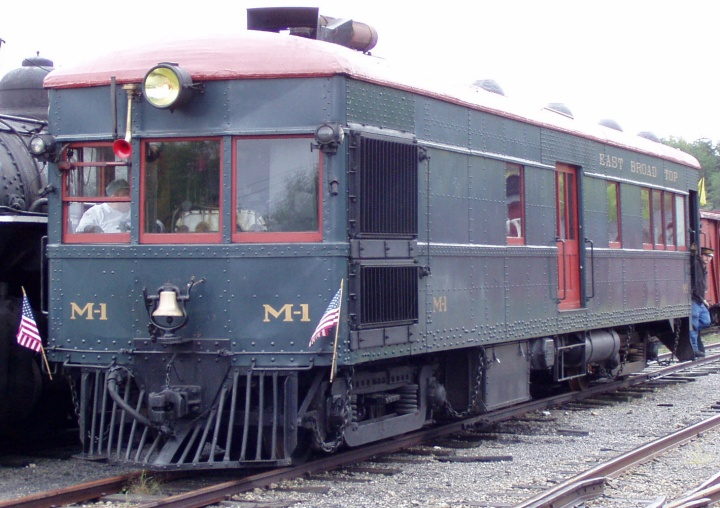
Lightweight diesel multiple units (informally referred to as "Doodlebugs") were popular in North America during the early 20th century.

Early forms of regional passenger rail in North America included interurban electric railways and multiple-unit self-propelled railcars, which operated on both dedicated and shared track. These services declined mid-century due to rising automobile use and federal investment in highways. In the postwar period, diesel multiple unit (DMU) services remained in operation on rural, branch line, and low-demand corridors, often utilizing Budd Rail Diesel Cars (RDCs). Though DMUs remained in limited service through the 1950s, the decade marked a nationwide decline in regional passenger rail. Many services were discontinued or restructured in response to declining ridership and changing travel patterns by the end of that decade.

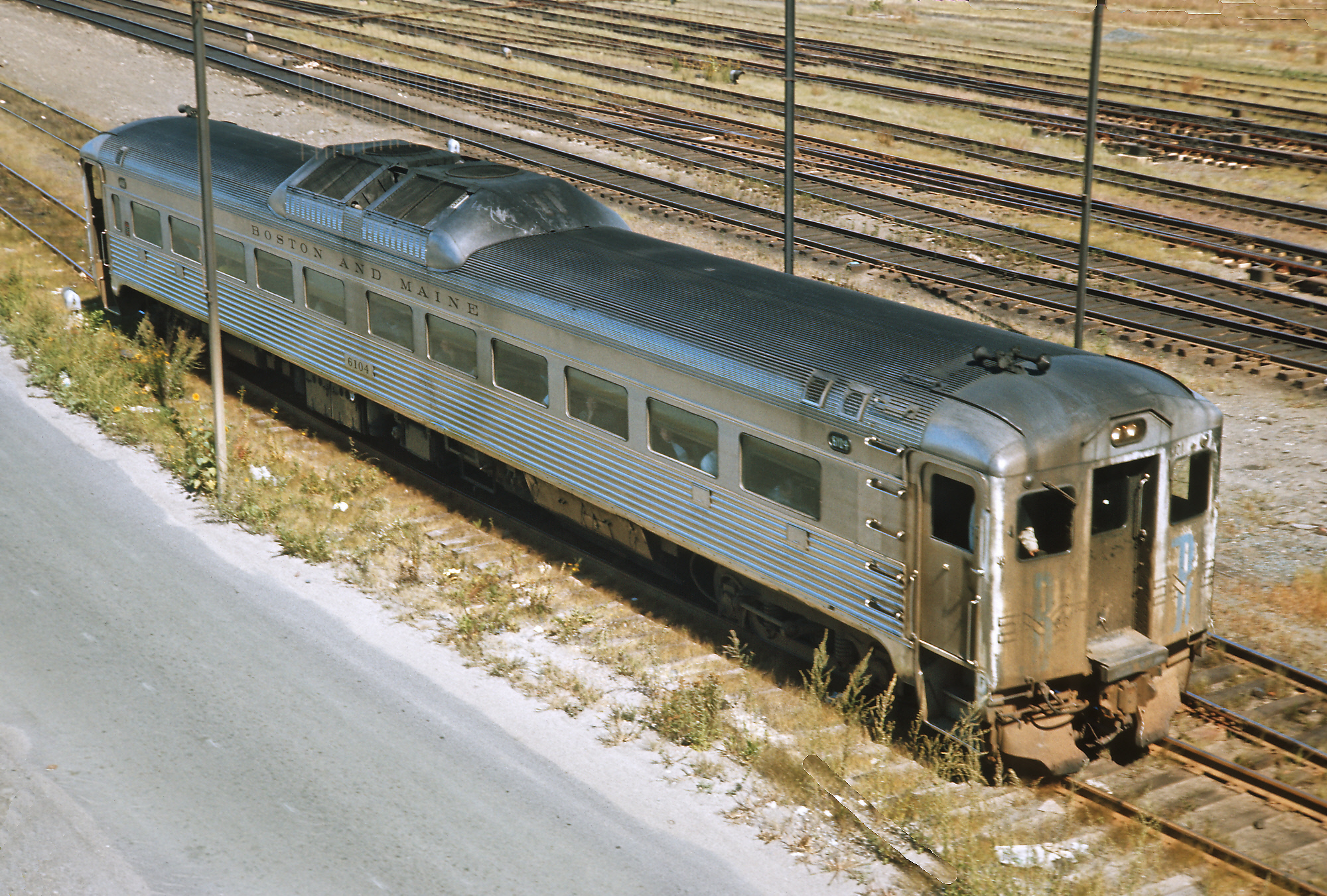
A Boston and Maine RDC approaching North Station in Boston on September 4, 1965.

By the 1960s, most regional passenger rail had either been discontinued or consolidated into subsidized commuter rail networks. By the mid-20th century, the Federal Railroad Administration (FRA) and its predecessors codified crashworthiness standards favoring heavy, reinforced vehicles operating on the national rail system that favored weight specification for push-pull freight operations. These Tier I standards required heavy, reinforced vehicles and effectively excluded lightweight multiple units from shared freight corridors. As a result, commuter rail in the U.S. shifted to locomotive-hauled trains, and the domestic market for passenger DMUs diminished. New or restructured commuter rail services favored high-density corridors with high ridership. In contrast, branch line and low-demand services were effectively eliminated nationwide. The last domestically manufactured DMU in the United States during the twentieth century was the Budd SPV-2000, produced in the late 1970s and early 1980s. The model was considered a commercial failure and contributed to the eventual bankruptcy and closure of the Budd Company.

Outside of North America, lightweight DMU rail systems continued to operate and evolve throughout the mid-to-late twentieth century. In Europe, countries such as Germany, France, and the United Kingdom maintained extensive DMU networks, particularly for regional and rural services. Germany's Schienenbusse and the British Rail Class 101 were designed for low-density routes. Similarly, in Japan, DMUs such as the KiHa series were widely deployed on non-electrified regional lines, offering reliable and efficient service where electrification was not economically viable. In South America, countries such as Argentina and Brazil also utilized lightweight railcars for interurban travel. These systems often featured simple, single-car or two-car configurations—sometimes referred to as "railcars"—designed for minimal infrastructure requirements and lower passenger volumes. The continued development and deployment of DMUs in these regions reflected differing regulatory environments, investment priorities, and operating conditions compared to the United States, Canada, and Mexico, where regulatory constraints and market conditions led to the near-total disappearance of DMU service by the 1980s.

Amid rising costs associated with operating traditional locomotive-hauled commuter trains, U.S. transit agencies in the 1980s and 1990s began reevaluating the potential of lightweight diesel services as a cost-effective solution for regional and lower-ridership corridors. The emergence and rapid expansion of light rail transit (LRT) systems during this period—beginning with projects in San Diego, Portland, and Sacramento—demonstrated the viability of lower-cost urban rail infrastructure paired with lighter rolling stock. These systems often used dedicated rights-of-way or shared space with automobiles, offering flexibility and reduced capital costs compared to heavy rail. The success of light rail projects encouraged planners and policymakers to explore whether similar principles could be applied to longer-distance, non-electrified corridors, particularly those on underutilized lines already owned by freight railroads.

SEPTA in Philadelphia conducted a pilot program in 1993, testing British Rail Class 142 Pacer units on non-electrified lines of its regional rail network. The goal was to assess the feasibility of using lightweight DMUs for suburban services; however, the Pacers faced challenges adapting to American operating conditions, including differences in platform heights, track standards, and regulatory requirements. Consequently, the pilot did not lead to widespread adoption, and all diesel-hauled regional rail services would be eliminated. By the late 1990s, growing interest in lower-cost regional rail prompted the FRA to develop a waiver process for shared-use operations. In 1999, the agency issued formal guidelines allowing non-compliant DMUs to operate under temporal separation from freight trains.

The first system to launch under this framework was NJ Transit's River Line in 2004. The model was subsequently adopted in other regions, including the North County Transit District's (NCTD's) Sprinter (California, 2008) and the Denton County Transportation Authority's (DCTA's) A-train (Texas, 2011), where capital constraints and moderate demand made traditional commuter rail impractical. By the mid-2000s, hybrid rail was promoted as a cost-effective solution for regions seeking to implement passenger rail service without the capital investment required for electrification or conventional commuter rail. Most systems were developed between 2004 and 2012, targeting corridors with existing freight tracks, moderate population densities, and constrained budgets.

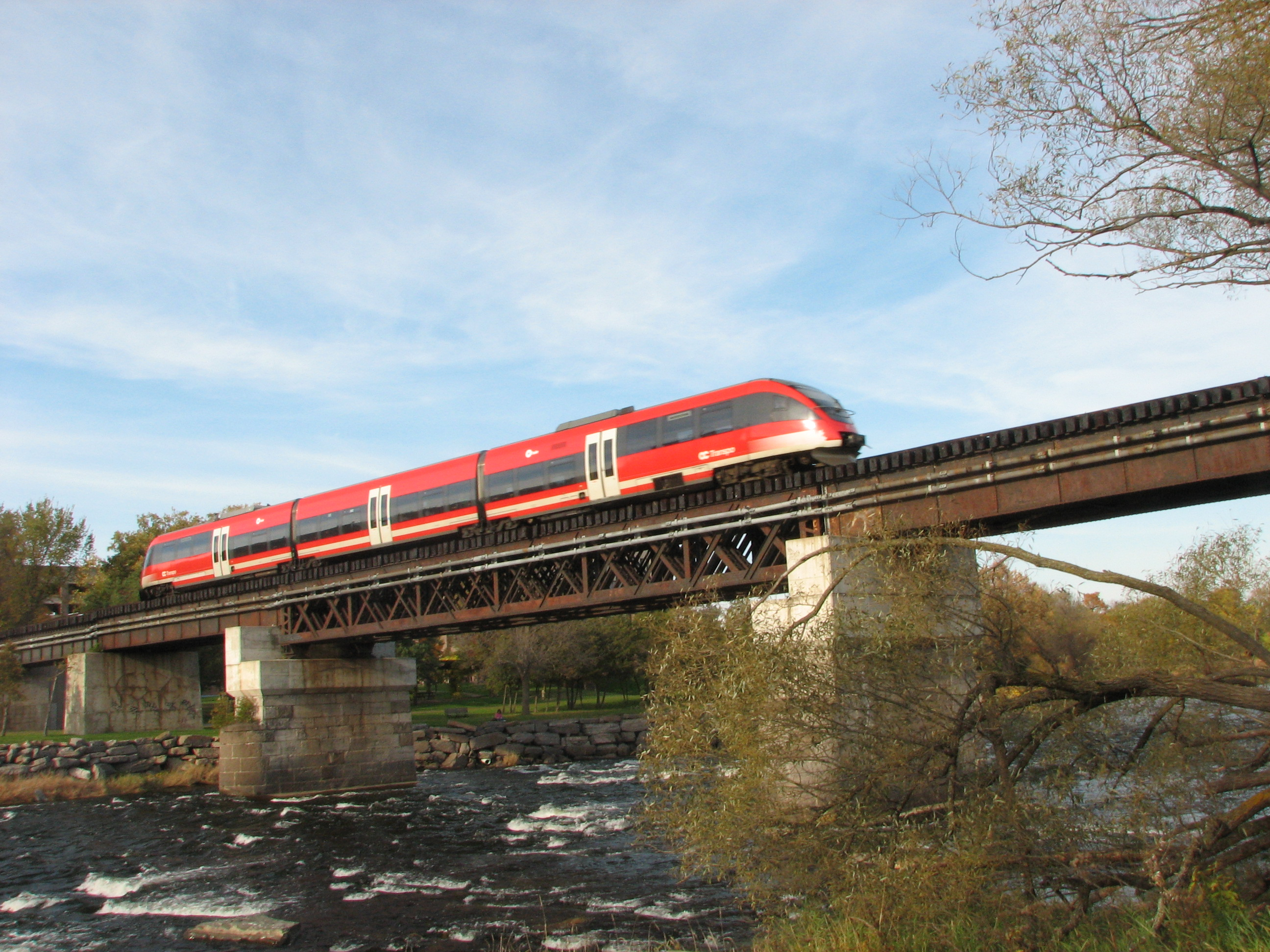
A Bombardier Talent DMU crossing the Rideau River on O-Train Line 2.

Comparable services have also operated in Canada and Mexico under different regulatory frameworks. In Canada, Ottawa's O-Train Line 2 began operation in 2001 as a "diesel light rail" demonstration project using Bombardier Talent DMUs on a shared freight alignment. It remained in service until 2020, when it was closed for conversion to an expanded commuter rail corridor. In Mexico, the Puebla–Cholula Tourist Train operated from 2017 to 2021 as a diesel tram-train service on rehabilitated freight track, connecting the cities of Puebla and Cholula. Although designed for tourism, it functioned as a regional connector, consistent with hybrid rail characteristics. The service was discontinued due to low ridership and high operational costs.

The reception of hybrid rail systems has been mixed. Proponents highlight the mode's ability to restore regional service at a lower cost per mile than commuter rail or light rail, especially in underutilized or freight-shared corridors. However, ridership has generally remained below original projections, and operational constraints—such as limited frequency, lack of electrification, and temporal separation from freight—have reduced effectiveness in attracting discretionary riders. For instance, New Jersey's River Line and California's Sprinter have maintained moderate ridership but failed to catalyze significant transit-oriented development. Texas's A-train similarly underperformed early forecasts, with weekday boardings averaging between 1,200 and 1,500 over its first decade. Since the early 2010s, new hybrid rail development has slowed considerably, due in part to shifting transportation funding priorities, regulatory complexities, and limited ridership gains from existing systems. New projects such as DART's Silver Line are designed for FRA-compliant Tier I operation, aligning them more closely with commuter or regional rail rather than hybrid rail.

== Rolling stock ==
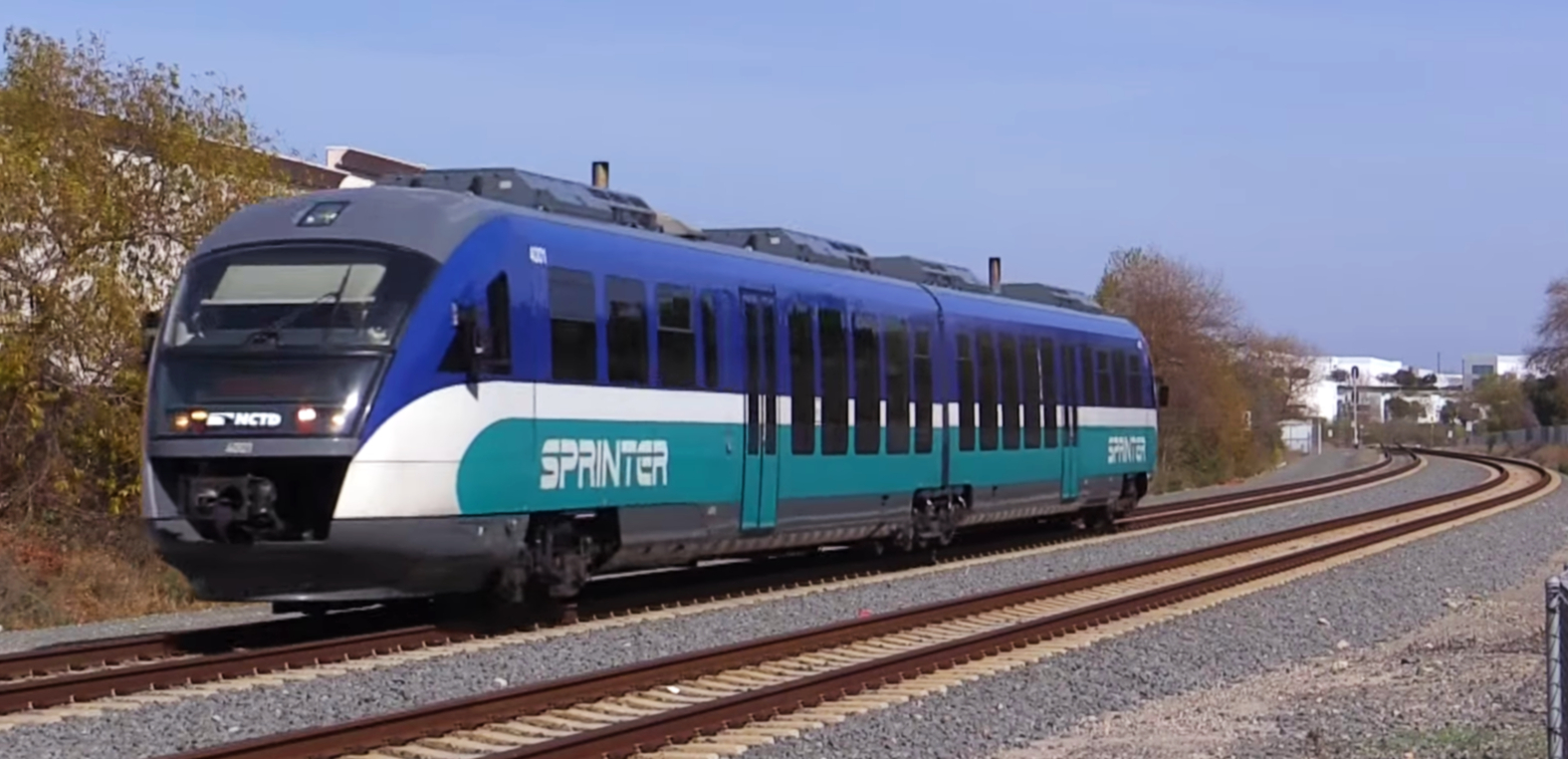
Sprinter in California operates Siemens Desiro Classic DMUs.

Early North American hybrid rail projects relied heavily on equipment derived from European models. A significant enabling factor was the reintroduction of diesel multiple units (DMUs) to the U.S. market by manufacturers such as Siemens and Stadler, which began offering modified versions of their European vehicles. NJ Transit's River Line operates Stadler GTW 2/6 DMUs, a design developed initially for regional services in Europe and adapted for limited compliance with North American safety requirements. Similarly, North County Transit District's (NCTD's) Sprinter in California operates Siemens Desiro Classic DMUs, modified for use under Federal Railroad Administration (FRA) shared-use waivers.

Newer systems, including Trinity Metro's TEXRail in Fort Worth and Metrolink's Arrow service in San Bernardino County, use Stadler FLIRT trainsets. In Europe, FLIRTs are typically used for regional and intercity services operating at higher average speeds on dedicated infrastructure, but their lightweight modular design has been adapted for North American hybrid rail applications. Across most systems, hybrid rail rolling stock typically maintains lighter axle loads and lower overall vehicle weights compared to traditional locomotive-hauled commuter trains. These vehicles are generally bidirectional, feature low-floor boarding for accessibility, and reduce the need for turning facilities at terminals. While most hybrid rail systems avoid mixed street traffic, limited in-street operation occurs on the River Line in Camden, New Jersey.

Some systems originally grouped in with hybrid rail, such as TriMet's WES Commuter Rail in Oregon and Sonoma–Marin Area Rail Transit (SMART) in California, use high-floor FRA Tier I-compliant DMUs. WES operates Colorado Railcar DMUs, and SMART operates Nippon Sharyo DMUs. These vehicles are significantly heavier and more structurally reinforced than typical European-style DMUs, and therefore fall under the regulatory category of conventional commuter rail rather than hybrid rail.

== Hybrid rail systems ==
=== Currently operating ===
System	City / area served	State	Year opened	System length	Stations	Rolling stock	Official classification
River Line	Camden–Trenton	New Jersey	2004	54.7 km (34.0 mi)	21	DMU	Light rail
Sprinter	Escondido–Oceanside	California	2008	35.4 km (22.0 mi)	15	DMU	Hybrid rail
CapMetro Rail Red Line	Austin–Leander	Texas	2010	51.5 km (32.0 mi)	9	DMU	Commuter rail (hybrid)
A-train	Denton–Carrollton	Texas	2011	33.8 km (21.0 mi)	5	DMU	Commuter rail
eBART	Eastern Contra Costa County	California	2018	16.1 km (10.0 mi)	2	DMU	Commuter rail (hybrid)
TEXRail	Fort Worth–DFW Airport	Texas	2019	43.5 km (27.0 mi)	9	DMU	Commuter rail (hybrid)
Arrow	Redlands–San Bernardino	California	2022	14.5 km (9.0 mi)	5	DMU/ZEMU	Commuter rail (hybrid)
DART Silver Line	Plano–DFW Airport	Texas	2025	41.8 km (26.0 mi)	10	DMU	Commuter rail (hybrid)

=== Proposed or under construction ===
System	City / area served	State	Planned opening	System length	Stations	Rolling stock	Official classification	Status
Rock Island Beverly Branch (BEMU Shuttle)	Chicago–Blue Island	Illinois	2027-2028	26.4 km (16.4 mi)	15	BEMU	Commuter rail (hybrid)	Early planning
Glassboro–Camden Line	Glassboro–Camden	New Jersey	2028	29.0 km (18.0 mi)	14	DMU	Light rail (hybrid)	Early planning
Valley Link	Dublin–Mountain House	California	2035	67.6 km (42.0 mi)	7	ZEMU	Commuter rail (hybrid)	Early planning
CapMetro Rail Green Line	Austin–Elgin	Texas	TBD	43.5 km (27.0 mi)	10	DMU	Commuter rail (hybrid)	Proposed
Pop-Up Metro	Philadelphia waterfront	Pennsylvania	TBD	1.9 km (1.2 mi)	TBD	BEMU	Commuter rail (hybrid)	Proposed
West Chester Metro	West Chester	Pennsylvania	TBD	14.8 km (9.2 mi)	6	BEMU	Commuter rail (hybrid)	Proposed

=== Canceled ===
System	City / area served	State	Year proposed	Year canceled	Proposed length	Stations	Rolling stock	Official classification	Reason for cancellation
Indigo Line (Note: Initially proposed with non-FRA-compliant DMUs; later revised to FRA-compliant Nippon Sharyo DMUs.)	Boston / Greater Boston	Massachusetts	2014	2015	Not determined	Not determined	DMU	Hybrid rail	Rising costs, lack of DMU manufacturers
Iowa City–North Liberty commuter rail	Iowa City–North Liberty	Iowa	2024	2025	13.2 km (8.2 mi)	6	BEMU	Commuter rail (hybrid)	Right-of-way dispute

== See also ==
- Light rail
- Railbus
- Railcar
- Diesel multiple unit
- Commuter rail in North America
- Light rail in North America
- Federal Railroad Administration
