= Coralville Transit =

Public transit in Coralville, Iowa, US

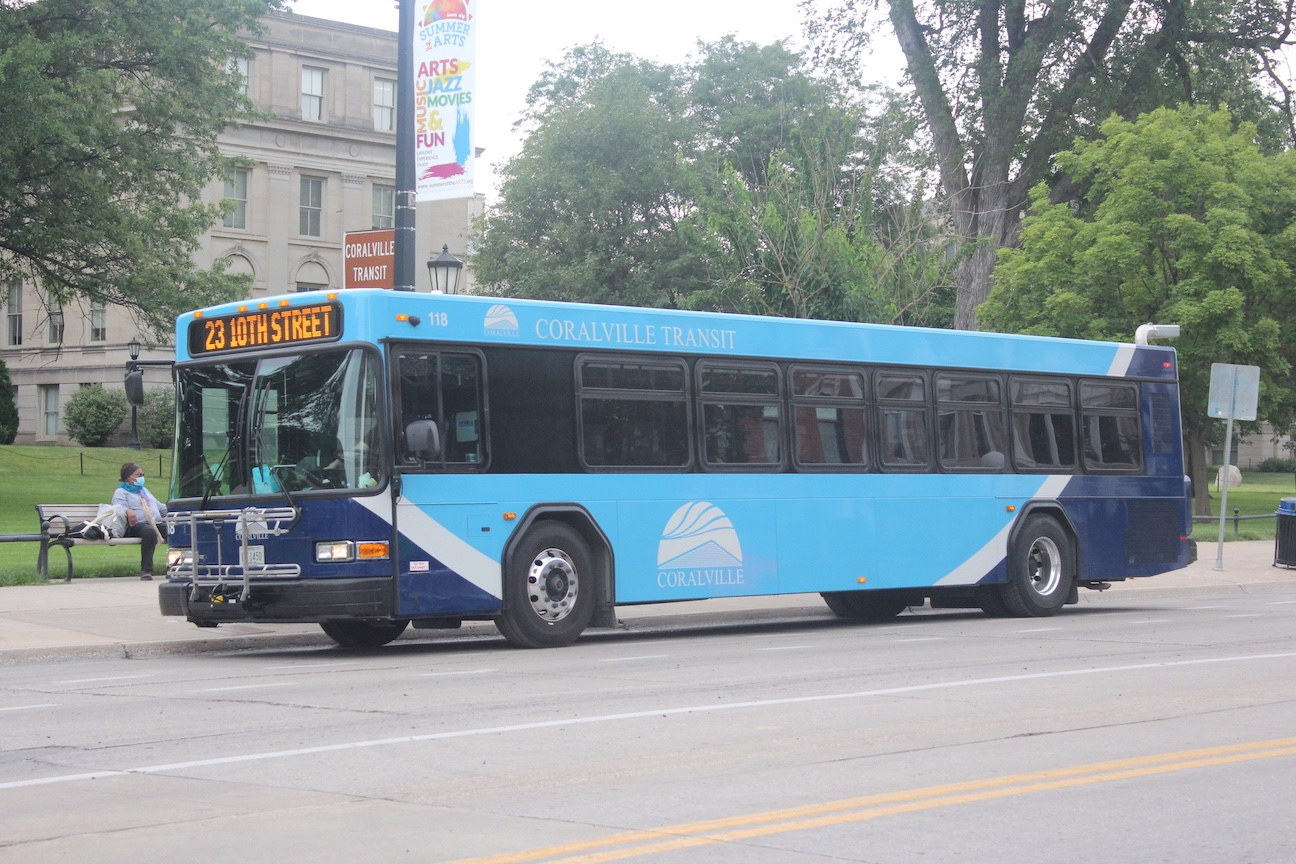
- Coralville Transit bus at the Pentacrest in downtown Iowa City
- Parent: City of Coralville
- Headquarters: 900 10th Street, Coralville, IA 52241
- Locale: Iowa City metropolitan area
- Service area: Coralville; North Liberty; Iowa City
- Service type: Transit bus
- Routes: 6
- Hubs: 2 (Iowa City Downtown Interchange & Coralville Transit Intermodal Facility)
- Fleet: 11
- Fuel type: Diesel
- Chief executive: Vicky Robrock
- Website: coralville.org/transit

Coralville Transit is the public transit operator in Coralville, Iowa, a suburb of Iowa City. Coralville Transit operates 6 routes serving Coralville, Iowa City, and the University of Iowa, with limited service to North Liberty. Coralville Transit has operated as a division of the city of Coralville since 1969.

The service provides several routes connecting downtown Iowa City with various destinations in Coralville, such as Coral Ridge Mall, Iowa River Landing, and Commerce Drive. Coralville Transit services connect to Iowa City Transit, the University of Iowa Cambus, and the 380 Express commuter bus, providing connections throughout the region.

== Routes ==
Coralville Transit provides 6 routes that run between downtown Iowa City, the University of Iowa campus, and various destinations in Coralville. 4 of these routes (routes 20-23) are weekday routes, one of which is a commuter route that runs once during the morning and afternoon rush hours to North Liberty (route 22). There is also a weeknight route (route 24) and a Saturday route (route 25), which are identical to each other in the route they run. All routes originate and terminate at the Iowa City Downtown Interchange (except for route 22, which originates near the Coralville Transit garage for its morning run, and terminates there for its evening run), and routes 20, 22, 24, and 25 serve the Coralville Transit Intermodal Facility at Iowa River Landing.

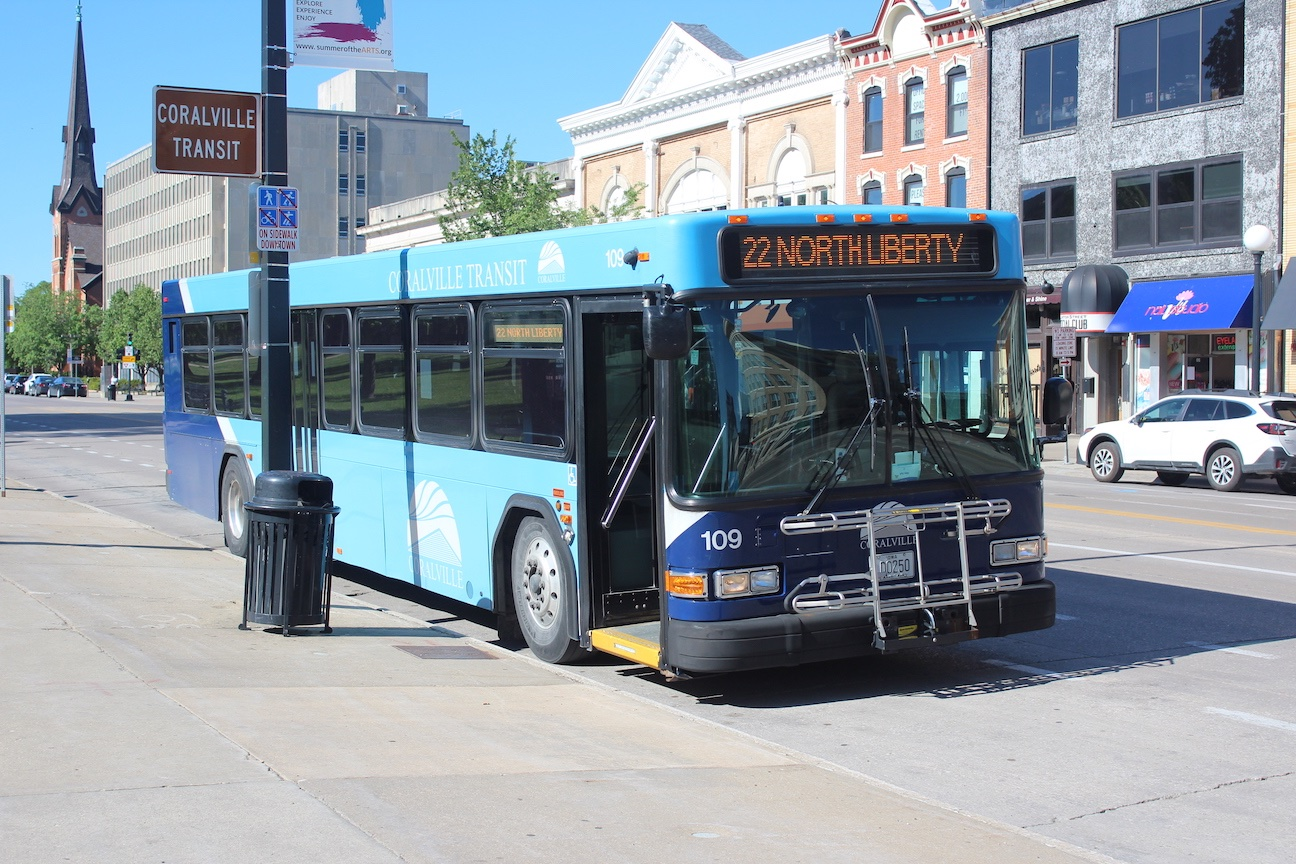
Route 22 at Downtown Interchange.

=== Route list ===
№	Name	Route	Notes
20	Iowa River Landing	Downtown Interchange to Coralville Transit Intermodal Facility	
21	5th Street	Downtown Interchange to Coral Ridge Mall and Commerce Drive via 5th Street	
22	North Liberty	Downtown Interchange to/from various points in North Liberty, originating/terminating at 10th St. & 12th Ave near the Coralville Transit garage	
23	10th Street	Downtown Interchange to Coral Ridge Mall via 10th Street	
24	Night	Downtown Interchange to Coral Ridge Mall via Coralville Transit Intermodal Facility and 10th Street outbound and 5th Street inbound	
25	Saturday	Downtown Interchange to Coral Ridge Mall via Coralville Transit Intermodal Facility and 10th Street outbound and 5th Street inbound	Identical to Route 24.

=== Former routes ===
Prior to October 19, 2020, Coralville Transit consisted of several unnumbered routes, including an express route that served residential areas north of Interstate 80.

Name	Route	Notes
1st Avenue/Iowa River Landing	VA Loop to Coralville Transit Intermodal Facility	Signed as Coralville 1st Avenue; Largely identical to the current Route 20, but terminates at VA loop instead of Downtown Interchange.
10th Street	Downtown Interchange to Coral Ridge Mall via 10th Street outbound and 5th Street inbound	Signed as Coralville 10th Street
AM Express	Downtown Interchange to points north of I-80 via Coralville Transit Intermodal Facility and 2nd Street, clockwise	
Express	Downtown Interchange to points north of I-80 via Coralville Transit Intermodal Facility and 2nd Street, counterclockwise	
Lantern Park	Downtown Interchange to Coral Ridge Mall via 5th Street outbound and 10th Street inbound	Signed as Coralville Lantern Park
North Liberty	Downtown Interchange to/from various points in North Liberty, originating/terminating at 10th St. & 12th Ave near the Coralville Transit garage	Inbound only during AM trip; outbound only during PM trip; Largely identical to the current Route 22
PM Special	Loop route serving various points north and south of I-80, originating/terminating at the Coralville Transit Intermodal Facility	Active during school days in the Iowa City Community School District.
Night/Saturday	Downtown Interchange to Coral Ridge Mall via Coralville Transit Intermodal Facility and 10th Street outbound and 5th Street inbound	Signed as Coralville; Largely identical to the current Routes 24 & 25

== Passes ==
Coralville Transit offers a number of bus passes which are mutually honored by Coralville Transit and Iowa City Transit. In addition, the University of Iowa U-Pass is available to University of Iowa students, faculty and staff. Free transfers are available to Iowa City Transit buses.

== Coralville Transit Intermodal Facility ==
The Coralville Transit Intermodal Facility, located at 906 Quarry Road, serves as a hub for Coralville Transit. Transfers to the 380 Express are available at the facility, which opened in August 2015. The $12.8 million structure includes an indoor waiting area, transit offices, information desks, and a parking ramp.

== Bus tracking ==
Like Iowa City Transit and Cambus, Coralville Transit uses the Transit app to show estimated arrival times at stops and precise locations of buses on the map. Prior to 2019, the BONGO (Bus on the Go) system was used for bus tracking on the three transit systems in the Iowa City area.

== Fleet ==
Fleet number(s)	Photo	Year	Manufacturer	Model	Notes
108		2009	Gillig	Low Floor 40'	First Gillig Low Floor in Coralville Transit's fleet.
109-112		2010	Gillig	Low Floor 40'	Funded by the American Recovery and Reinvestment Act of 2009.
114-117		2017	Gillig	Low Floor 40'	Entered service in November 2017.
118		2020	Gillig	Low Floor 40'	
