= Cambus =

American bus company

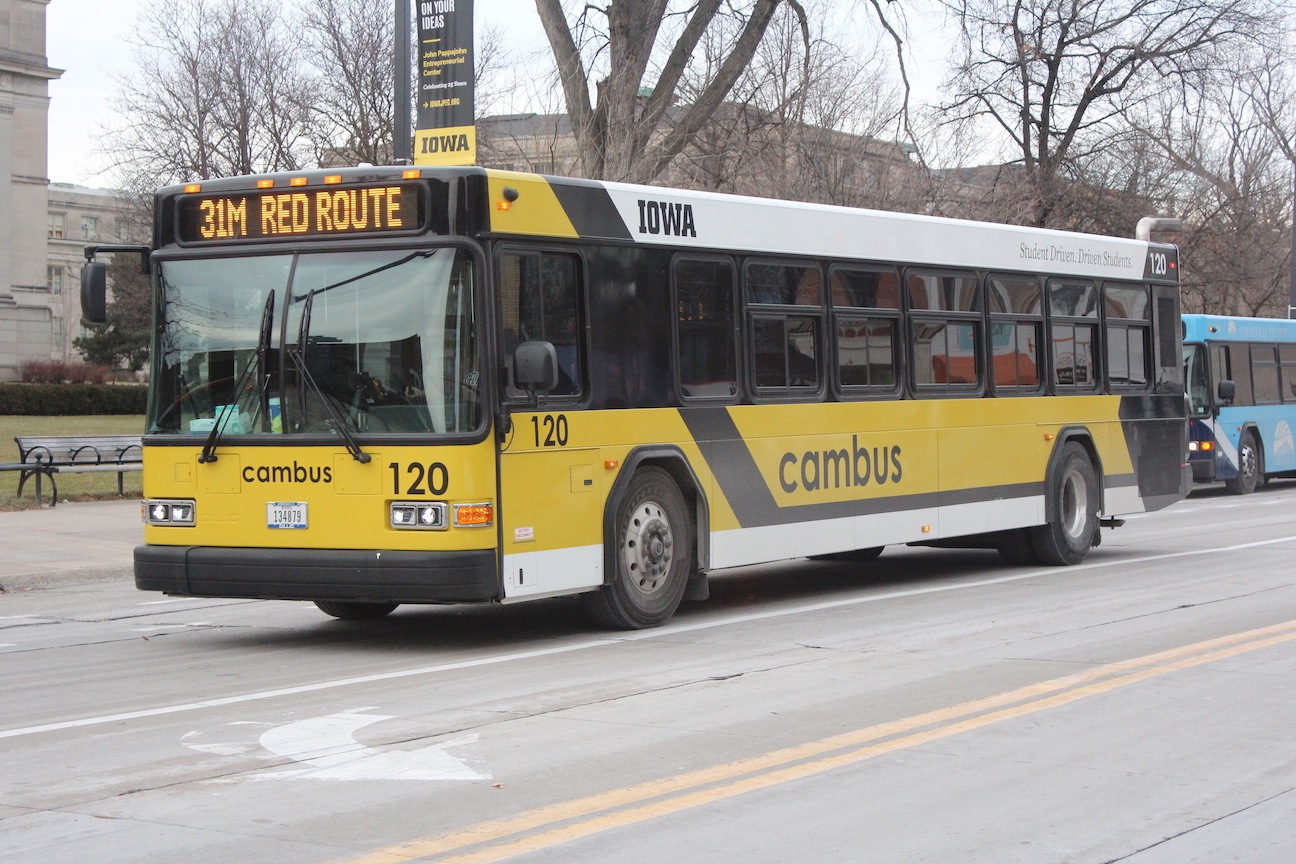
- Cambus bus in downtown Iowa City, 2021
- Founded: 1972
- Headquarters: West Campus Transportation Center
- Locale: Iowa City, IA
- Service area: University of Iowa
- Service type: University bus system
- Routes: 12
- Hubs: 3 (Iowa City Downtown Interchange, Health Sciences Interchange, & West Campus Transportation Center)
- Fleet: 39 (32 Fixed Route buses & 7 Bionic Buses)
- Daily ridership: 8,250
- Fuel type: Ultra-Low Sulfur Diesel & Gasoline
- Chief executive: Mia Brunelli
- Website: transportation.uiowa.edu/cambus

Cambus is an American public transport bus system, primarily serving the University of Iowa campus in Iowa City, Iowa. The service is intended to provide transportation for students, faculty, and staff around the main campus, University of Iowa Research Park, residence halls, and commuter parking lots. Cambus is a zero-fare service open to the general public, and provides approximately 3,000,000 rides per year. Since its founding in 1972, Cambus has provided more than 165 million passenger trips. It is one of three transit systems in the Iowa City area, the other two being Iowa City Transit and Coralville Transit, and Cambus shares several stops with them.

The service is operated by the Department of Parking and Transportation for the University of Iowa with funding from the Parking & Transportation Department, a UI Student fee, and the Federal Transportation Administration. Cambus employs approximately 170 employees. There are only sixteen non-student employees who work specifically for Cambus: the Cambus Manager, Operations Supervisor, Programs and Compliance Coordinator, Maintenance Supervisor, four full-time mechanics, three full-time training supervisors and five full-time drivers. All other employees, including drivers, dispatchers, trainers, student mechanics, departmental supervisors, and office assistants, are students currently enrolled at the University of Iowa.

Cambus operates out of two primary facilities on the University of Iowa campus. The main office and dispatch center are located in the West Campus Transportation Center on Evashevski Drive, north of Kinnick Stadium. The Cambus Maintenance Facility—often referred to by employees as “The Barn”—is located on South Madison Street, south of the Campus Recreation and Wellness Center, and serves as the site where buses are serviced and stored overnight.

== History ==
Cambus was founded by University of Iowa students and has been in operation since March 1972. The name "Cambus" was the result of a naming contest. It started with seven vehicles dating from 1955 and 1956. By 1975, the fleet had grown to 11 vehicles. Twelve new buses were purchased the following year. In 2004, the fleet had 32 vehicles. The University of Iowa campus is divided into east and west halves by the Iowa River. Most Liberal Arts and Sciences classes take place on the east side of the river; thus the purpose of the new bus service was to facilitate easier transportation between the west-side dormitories and the east-side classrooms. At first there was no name for this service, so the founding students created a contest open to all UI students to select one. "Cambus" was the name eventually chosen, and the winner, Rod Speidel, a junior graphic design student, was awarded two free pizzas.

The first Cambus buses were used school buses, repainted by Cambus employees. There were three different bus routes; Red Route, Blue Route, and the Interdorm Shuttle. Cambus also acquired a trailer, which was used as their main office; this was located in the Hancher Auditorium parking lot.

Cambus moved its administrative and dispatch operations to the newly opened West Campus Transportation Center on November 16, 2012. The facility serves as the headquarters for the University of Iowa Department of Parking and Transportation, which includes Cambus among its operating units.

In the 2013 financial year, ridership reached 4.5 million.

In October, 2018, Cambus routes and schedules were integrated with Google Maps.

Following a recommendation from the Iowa City Area Transit Study (ICATS), Cambus began using route numbers in July 2021.

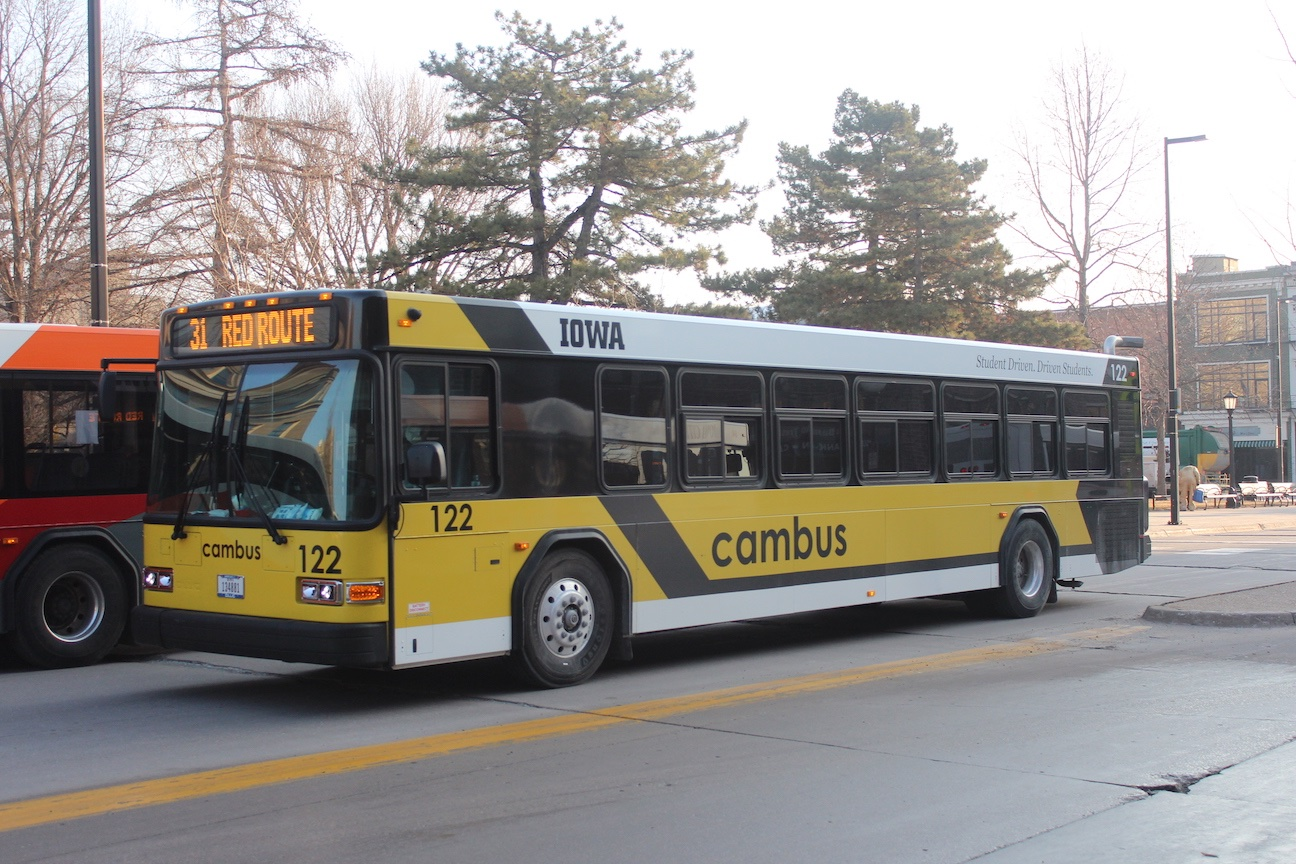
Route 31 at Downtown Interchange/Schaeffer Hall.

== Routes ==
Cambus currently has twelve routes in service, plus several on-demand shuttles intended to fill gaps within fixed route service schedules.

During Academic service (the Spring and Fall semesters), all routes run on weekdays, while 31M Red Route, 32M Blue Route, and 43 Hawkeye-Interdorm run on the weekend. During Summer and Interim service, service runs with reduced frequency without any weekend fixed-route service. 35 Interdorm, 36 East Dorm Shuttle, 43 Hawkeye-Interdorm, and 54 Hancher-Newton Road do not run over the summer. Route maps and schedules are available on the Cambus website. Cambus time is set by the Master Clock at the US Naval Observatory.

During academic service, service operates from approximately 4:30 a.m. until 1:02 a.m. on weekdays.

The gimmick used to remember the directions for Blue and Red Route is: from downtown take "Red to Rienow" and "Blue to Burge."

Cambus also provides special service for university-affiliated groups, including shuttle service for most Hawkeye football games (to/from downtown, Hancher, and the Hawkeye Commuter Lot), Hawkeye basketball games (to/from Hancher and the Hawkeye Commuter Lot), orientation shuttles, campus tours, and other events on campus.

=== Route list ===
No.	Name	Route	Notes
31	Red Route	WCTC → Hardin Library → MERF → PBDB → Hancher East → Mayflower Hall (31M only) → Currier Hall → Schaeffer Hall → Rienow Hall	31M services Mayflower Hall after 7:00 PM on weekdays, and all day on weekends
32	Blue Route	WCTC → Slater Hall → Seamans Center → Macbride Hall → Burge Hall → Mayflower Hall (32M only) → Hancher West → Student Health → Newton Road Ramp → VA Hospital	32M services Mayflower Hall after 7:00 PM on weekdays, and all day on weekends
33	South Campus Shuttle	Macbride Hall → Voxman Music Building → Lot 11 → Seamans Center	Discontinued in October 2023 due to a driver staff shortage
34	Research Park	HSI → MERF → PBDB → IREH → East Lot	Signed as 34 UI Research Park; Shortened in May 2025 to no longer serve destinations north of Oakdale Boulevard; service replaced by the Research Park/MCNL On-Demand shuttle.
35	Interdorm	Mayflower Hall → Currier Hall → Schaeffer Hall → Rienow Hall → Slater Hall → Seamans Center → Macbride Hall → Burge Hall	
36	East Dorm Shuttle	Mayflower Hall → Currier Hall → Schaeffer Hall → Macbride Hall → Burge Hall	
41	Hawk Lot-Hospital	Hawkeye Lot ↔ WCTC	
42	Hawkeye-Pentacrest	Macbride Hall → Schaeffer Hall → Student Health → Newton Road Ramp → HSI (to Hawkeye) → Hawkeye Lot → Aspire → HSI (to downtown) → MERF → PBDB	
43	Hawkeye Interdorm	Macbride Hall → Mayflower Hall → Currier Hall → Schaeffer Hall → Rienow Hall → WCTC (to Hawkeye) → Hawkeye Lot → Aspire → WCTC (to downtown) → Slater Hall → Seamans Center	
51	Hospital-Finkbine/Arena	Finkbine Lot South → Arena Lot East → WCTC	Services Arena before Finkbine in PM service
52	Finkbine-Pentacrest	Macbride Hall → Schaeffer Hall → Newton Road Ramp → HSI (to lots) → Finkbine Lot South → Arena Lot East → HSI (to downtown) → MERF	Services Arena before Finkbine in PM service
53	VA Loop Shuttle	Finkbine Lot South → Arena Lot East → HSI	
54	Hancher-Newton Road	HSI ↔ Hancher Lot East	
61	ODS Commuter	The On-Demand Shuttle service services the existing CAMBUS stops at Lots 85 (Hawkeye Commuter), 65 (Finkbine), 75 (Arena), 55 (Hancher), Aspire, Health Sciences Campus and the West Campus Transportation Center.	Served year-round on weekdays between 8:45 AM and 12:30 AM
62	ODS Main Campus	The On-Demand shuttle serves the main campus zone when other fixed-route services are not available. The On-Demand Shuttle only serves existing CAMBUS stops throughout main campus; it does not include stops in Coralville or at the Research Park campus.	Served during university breaks, and summer weekdays and summer weekends. 8:45 p.m. - 12:30 a.m. during break and summer weekdays, 11:30 a.m. - 6:30 p.m. during summer weekends.
63	ODS Research Park/Medical Center North Liberty	Research Park/MCNL On-Demand Shuttle provides a connection between the Health Sciences Campus on Newton Road and health care facilities on the Research Park campus, including Medical Center North Liberty (MCNL) and Hospital Shared Services Building (HSSB).	Served year-round on weekdays between 6 AM and 6 PM

== Bus Tracking ==
Live bus tracking using GPS was introduced in 2010 with the BONGO (Bus on the Go) service. This was replaced in December 2019 with bus tracking in the Transit app.

== Bionic Bus ==
In accordance with the Americans with Disabilities Act (ADA), Cambus provides paratransit service called the Bionic Bus for University staff, faculty, and students. There are up to 3 paratransit buses in service during normal academic service (fewer run on weekends and during interim service). The service is demand-response curb-to-curb and serves much of Iowa City and Coralville. Student drivers may apply to drive Bionic Bus 3 months after completing training and passing their final drive, and are specially trained. Unlike Iowa City Transit and Coralville Transit, the paratransit service is handled in-house and not contracted to Johnson County SEATS.

== Fleet ==
Fleet number(s)	Photo	Year	Manufacturer	Model	Notes
14-16		2013	Gillig	Low Floor 29'	Used for special services and CDL training and testing
17-23		2020-2026	Ram New England Wheels	ProMaster Frontrunner; LFXLT	Used for on-demand and Bionic Bus service; Bus 17 was retired in April 2026
94-105		2009	Gillig	Low Floor 40'	
106-116		2010-2011	Gillig	Low Floor 40'	
117-118		2013	Gillig	Low Floor 40'	
119		2018	Gillig	Low Floor 40'	
120-122		2019	Gillig	Low Floor 40'	Order placed in December 2018 with the assistance of federal grant money.; Feature a redesigned livery.

== See also ==
- List of bus transit systems in the United States
- Iowa City Transit
