= Madison W. Cornwall =

American settler and politician

Madison W. Cornwall was a pioneering settler in Milwaukee and Waukesha Township in Wisconsin Territory. He served in the Territorial House of Representatives from Milwaukee County, which at that time included what would later become Waukesha County, for all three sessions of the 1st Wisconsin Territorial Assembly.

== Background ==
Cornwall, a native of Monroe County, Virginia is among those recorded as having arrived in Milwaukee in 1835. He (referred to as "Dr. Cornwall") and his companion William A. Nickell are reported to have appeared in what was originally called Prairieville, then Prairieville, and eventually Waukesha in June of 1835. Nickell was also from Monroe County, Virginia and was the son of A. C. and Eliza (Cornwall) Nickell; so Cornwall may be presumed to be a maternal kinsman of Nickell. The two claimed all of Section 9 of that township, and 200 acres more beside, for a total of 849 acres: 1.3125 square miles (339.9 ha). The two spent the summer living out of their wagon, then each built himself a log shanty on the south end of the land. In the territorial census, Cornwall is listed in Waukesha as the head of household of six people, but whether these were family or workers is not known.

== Legislative office ==
Cornwall was part of a ticket of Democrats nominated for the various Milwaukee County seats in the first Territorial Legislature: Alanson Sweet, Gilbert Knapp, William B. Sheldon, Charles Durkee, and Cornwall. All of them were elected, and Cornwall served in all three sessions of that body.

== The absconding Dr. Cornwall ==
An 1880 history of Waukesha County recounts an anecdote describing Democrats advised to avoid being "disappointed in [a candidate], as the Democrats had previously been in the absconding Dr. Cornwall". This implies a scandal or controversy once known to all in the region. This seems connect with an 1842 notice from the Louisville Sun looking for news of Madison W. Cornwall, a former collector for that newspaper.

He is about six feet high, has black hair and eyes, and remarkable lofty and prominent forehead, in which there is considerable sink about midway the eyebrows and hair; is insinuating in his manner, talks a great deal, and has some knowledge of Phrenology which he is very fond of displaying.

== Reported dead ==
In mid-July, 1879, a conference and re-union of pioneering officials of Wisconsin Territory was held in Madison. As part of the proceedings, a list of the former officeholders was read out, and the attendees queried as to the fate of their peers. Cornwall was among those reported dead.
