= 1st Wisconsin Territorial Assembly =

Legislature of the Wisconsin Territory

←	Michigan Territory	2nd	→

Overview
- Legislative body: Legislative Assembly of the Wisconsin Territory
- Meeting place: Belmont, Wisconsin Territory^{(1st session)}; Burlington, Wisconsin Territory^{(2nd & special session)}
- Term: October 25, 1836 – November 5, 1838
- Election: October 10, 1836

Council
- Members: 13
- President: Henry S. Baird (W)^{(1st session)}; Arthur B. Ingram^{(2nd & special session)}

House of Representatives
- Members: 26
- Speaker: Peter H. Engle (D)^{(1st session)}; Isaac Leffler (W)^{(2nd session)}; William B. Sheldon (D)^{(special session)}

Sessions
- 1st: October 25, 1836 – December 9, 1836
- 2nd: November 6, 1837 – January 20, 1838

Special sessions
- Special: June 11, 1838 – June 25, 1838

The First Legislative Assembly of the Wisconsin Territory convened from October 25, 1836, to December 9, 1836, and from November 6, 1837, to January 20, 1838, in regular session. The Assembly also convened in special session from June 11, 1838, to June 25, 1838.

The first session was held at Belmont, Iowa County (in present-day Lafayette County, Wisconsin). The 2nd session and special session were held at Burlington, Des Moines County (in present-day Des Moines County, Iowa).

The three sessions of the 1st Legislative Assembly were the only legislative sessions to take place before the division of the Iowa Territory from the Wisconsin Territory.

== Major events ==
- April 30, 1836: Henry Dodge was appointed the first Governor of the Wisconsin Territory.
- October 10, 1836: George Wallace Jones elected delegate to the United States House of Representatives from Wisconsin Territory's at-large congressional district.
- December 1836: Henry S. Baird appointed the first Attorney General for the Wisconsin Territory.
- January 26, 1837: Michigan was admitted to the United States as the 26th state.
- February 6, 1837: William B. Slaughter appointed the 2nd Secretary of the Wisconsin Territory.
- March 4, 1837: Inauguration of Martin Van Buren as the 8th President of the United States.
- May 10, 1837: The Panic of 1837 began in New York City.
- June 20, 1837: Queen Victoria acceded to the throne of the United Kingdom of Great Britain and Ireland upon the death of King William IV at Windsor Castle.
- June 27, 1837: The first edition of the Milwaukee Sentinel was published in Milwaukee.
- November 7, 1837: Abolitionist Elijah Parish Lovejoy was killed by a pro-slavery mob in Alton, Illinois.
- June 12, 1838: President Martin Van Buren signed legislation creating the Iowa Territory from the part of the Wisconsin Territory west of the Mississippi River. The division became effective July 4, 1838.
- June 28, 1838: The coronation of Queen Victoria took place at Westminster Abbey.
- September 1838: James Duane Doty elected delegate to the United States House of Representatives from Wisconsin Territory's at-large congressional district.
- October 3, 1838: The Sauk leader Black Hawk died in the Iowa Territory.

== Major legislation ==
- November 2, 1836: The Council concurs on adoption of the first great seal of the territory
- December 3, 1836: An Act to establish the seat of government of the territory of Wisconsin, and to provide for the erection of public buildings, 1836 Wis. Terr. Act 11. Established Madison as the capital city of Wisconsin.
- December 7, 1836: An Act to divide the counties of Brown and Milwaukee, 1836 Wis. Terr. Act 28. Created the counties of Calumet, Dane, Dodge, Fond du Lac, Jefferson, Manitowoc, Marquette, Portage, Racine, and Washington.
- December 8, 1836: An Act to divide the county of Iowa, 1836 Wis. Terr. Act 31. Created the counties of Grant and Green.
- January 12, 1838: An Act to abolish imprisonment for debt, and other purposes, 1837 Wis. Terr. Act 37.
- January 17, 1838: An Act relating to the militia, and public defense of the territory of Wisconsin, 1838 Wisc. Terr. Act 58.
- January 17, 1838: An Act to incorporate the borough of Green Bay, 1838 Wisc. Terr. Act 66.
- June 23, 1838: An Act to district the territory of Wisconsin into electoral districts and to apportion the representation of each, 1838 Wisc. Terr. Special Session Act 18.

== Sessions ==
- 1st session: October 25, 1836 – December 9, 1836
- 2nd session: November 6, 1837 – January 20, 1838
- Special session: June 11, 1838 – June 25, 1838

== Leadership ==
=== Council President ===
- Henry S. Baird (W) - during the 1st session
- Arthur B. Ingram - during the 2nd and special sessions

=== Speaker of the House of Representatives ===
- Peter H. Engle (D) - during the 1st session
- Isaac Leffler (W) - during the 2nd session
- William B. Sheldon (D) - during the special session

== Members ==
=== Members of the Council ===
Counties	Councillor	Session(s)			Party
Counties	Councillor	1st	2nd	Spec.	Party
Brown	Henry S. Baird	✓			Whig
Brown	John P. Arndt	✓	✓	✓	Whig
Brown	Joseph Dickinson		✗ (Note: Lost contested seat.)		
Brown	Alexander J. Irwin		✓ (Note: Appointed to vacant seat.)	✓	
Des Moines	Jeremiah Smith Jr.	✓	✓	✓	
Des Moines	Joseph B. Teas	✓	✓	✓	
Des Moines	Arthur B. Ingram	✓	✓	✓	
Dubuque	Thomas McCraney	✓	✓	✓	
Dubuque	John Foley	✓	✓	✓	
Dubuque	Thomas McKnight	✓	✓	✓	Whig
Iowa	Ebenezer Brigham	✓	✓	✓	Whig
Iowa	John B. Terry	✓	✓	✓	
Iowa	James R. Vineyard	✓	✓	✓	Dem.
Milwaukee	Alanson Sweet	✓	✓	✓	Dem.
Milwaukee	Gilbert Knapp	✓	✓	✓	Whig

=== Members of the House of Representatives ===
Counties	Representative	Session(s)			Party
Counties	Representative	1st	2nd	Spec.	Party
Brown	Ebenezer Childs	✓	✓	✓	
Brown	Albert G. Ellis	✓			Dem.
Brown	Alexander J. Irwin	✗			
Brown	George McWilliams	✓ (Note: Won contested seat.)	✓	✓	
Brown	Charles C. Sholes		✓	✓	Dem.
Crawford	James H. Lockwood	✓			Whig
Crawford	James B. Dallam	✓			
Crawford	Ira B. Brunson		✓	✓	Dem.
Crawford	Jean Brunet		✓	✓	
Des Moines	Isaac Leffler	✓	✓	✓	Whig
Des Moines	Thomas Blair	✓	✓	✓	
Des Moines	John Box	✓	✓	✓	
Des Moines	George W. Teas	✓	✓	✓	
Des Moines	David R. Chance	✓	✓	✓	
Des Moines	Warren L. Jenkins	✓	✓	✓	
Des Moines	Eli Reynolds	✓			
Des Moines	John Reynolds		✓	✓	
Dubuque	Loring Wheeler	✓	✓	✓	
Dubuque	Hardin Nowlin	✓	✓	✓	
Dubuque	Hosea T. Camp	✓ (Note: Died.)			
Dubuque	Peter H. Engle	✓	✓	✓	Dem.
Dubuque	Patrick Quigley	✓	✓ (Note: Resigned Jan. 17, 1838.)		
Dubuque	Alexander W. McGregor		✓ (Note: Resigned due to bribery investigation.)		
Dubuque	Lucius H. Langworthy			✓	
Iowa	William Boyles	✓	✓	✓	
Iowa	George F. Smith	✓	✓		
Iowa	Daniel M. Parkinson	✓	✓	✓	Dem.
Iowa	Thomas McKnight	✓	✓	✓	
Iowa	Thomas Shanley	✓	✓	✓	Whig
Iowa	James P. Cox	✓	✓	✓	Whig
Iowa	James Collins			✓	Whig
Milwaukee	William B. Sheldon	✓	✓	✓	Dem.
Milwaukee	Madison W. Cornwall	✓	✓	✓	Dem.
Milwaukee	Charles Durkee	✓	✓	✓	Dem.

== Employees ==
=== Council employees ===
- Secretary:
  - Edward McSherry, 1st session
  - George Beatty, 2nd & special sessions
- Sergeant-at-Arms:
  - William Henry, 1st session
  - Levi Sterling, 2nd session
  - George W. Harris, special session

=== House employees ===
- Chief Clerk:
  - Warren Lewis, 1st session
  - John Catlin, 2nd & special sessions
- Sergeant-at-Arms:
  - Jesse M. Harrison, 1st session
  - William Morgan, 2nd & special sessions
