= John Parker (Iowa politician) =

American politician

John Parker was a local American politician in Dubuque County in the Iowa District of what was first the Michigan Territory, then the Wisconsin Territory, and eventually the Iowa Territory. He was elected to the last legislature of the old Michigan Territory to represent his district; but did not attend.

== Public affairs ==
In 1835, those parts of Michigan Territory who were not set to become part of the new State of Michigan were invited to elect members to a seventh and last Michigan Territorial Council. The citizens of Dubuque County (the north half of the Iowa District) in October elected Parker and Dr. Allen Hill, but due to concerns about the irregularity of their election they did not attend what came to be called the "Rump Council" when it met (briefly) in January 1836. Parker would later publish a statement that his failure to appear "was very satisfactory, to those who elected me at the time", since a proclamation had apparently been issued moving up the meeting date to one which neither Hill nor Parker would be able to attend.

On June 17, 1837, Dubuque County's Democrats nominated Parker for the seat in the House of Representatives (lower house) of the 1st Wisconsin Territorial Assembly, to fill the vacancy created by the death of fellow Democrat Hosea T. Camp. He lost to Alexander W. McGregor (who had not announced a party affiliation), with 311 votes to McGregor's 452.

Parker remained active in local affairs, and after Iowa became a state was elected assessor in 1856 for the City of Dubuque.
