= Isaac Leffler =

American politician (1788–1866)

Member of the U.S. House of Representatives from Virginia's 18th district
- In office March 4, 1827 – March 3, 1829
- Preceded by: Joseph Johnson
- Succeeded by: Philip Doddridge

Speaker of the House of Representatives of the Wisconsin Territory
- In office November 6, 1837 – June 11, 1838
- Preceded by: Peter H. Engle
- Succeeded by: William B. Sheldon

Member of the House of Representatives of the Wisconsin Territory for Des Moines County
- In office October 25, 1836 – November 26, 1838 Serving with Thomas Blair, John Box, George W. Teas, David R. Chance, Warren L. Jenkins, & Eli Reynolds
- Preceded by: Position established
- Succeeded by: Position abolished

Member of the Virginia House of Delegates from the Ohio district
- In office December 3, 1832 – December 2, 1833 Serving with John Parrott
- Preceded by: Samuel H. Fitzhugh & John Parrott
- Succeeded by: John Parrott & John McLure
- In office December 5, 1825 – December 3, 1827 Serving with William McKinley (1825–1826) & Morgan Nelson (1826–1827)
- Preceded by: William McKinley & Zachariah Jacob
- Succeeded by: Samuel H. Fitzhugh & John Parrott
- In office December 1, 1823 – November 29, 1824 Serving with Adam Faris
- Preceded by: Adam Faris & James Shannon
- Succeeded by: William McKinley & Zachariah Jacob
- In office December 1, 1817 – December 6, 1819 Serving with William Irwin (1817–1818) & Moses W. Chapline (1818–1819)
- Preceded by: Alexander Caldwell & William Irwin
- Succeeded by: William Irwin & William Chapline

Personal details
- Born: November 7, 1788 Washington County, Pennsylvania, U.S.
- Died: March 8, 1866 (aged 77) Chariton, Iowa, U.S.
- Resting place: Aspen Grove Cemetery, Burlington, Iowa, U.S.
- Party: Adams Party (1820s); Whig (1830s–1840s)
- Spouses: Rebecca Foreman (m. 1813; died 1830); Lethenia Sprigg Mitchell; (died 1879)
- Children: Jane Ellouise (Kelly)^{(b. 1816; died 1888)}; Emily (Chalfant)^{(b. 1826; died 1898)}; Sarah Lowther (Edwards)^{(b. 1844; died 1908)}
- Relatives: Shepherd Leffler (brother)

Isaac Leffler (November 7, 1788 – March 8, 1866), sometimes spelled Lefler or Loeffler, was an American lawyer and Iowa pioneer who represented Virginia's 18th congressional district in the United States House of Representatives for one term in the 1820s. He also served in the legislatures of the Commonwealth of Virginia, as well as the Wisconsin and Iowa Territories. His younger brother, Shepherd Leffler, became one of Iowa's first congressmen after achieving statehood.

== Early life and education ==
Born on his grandfather's plantation, "Sylvia's Plain," in Washington County, Pennsylvania, near Wheeling, Virginia (now West Virginia), Leffler attended the public schools and was graduated from Jefferson College, (now Washington & Jefferson College), in Canonsburg, Pennsylvania.

== Virginia career ==
After studying law, he was admitted to the bar and commenced practice in Wheeling. He served as a member of the Virginia House of Delegates for six terms, serving in the 1817–1819 sessions, the 1823–1824 session, the 1825–1827 sessions, and the 1832–1833 session. He also served as a member of the Virginia Board of Public Works in 1827.

In 1826, Leffler was elected as an Adams Party candidate to the Twentieth Congress, defeating incumbent Jacksonian Joseph Johnson. When running for re-election in 1828, he was beaten (along with President John Quincy Adams). Although Andrew Jackson defeated Adams, Leffler was defeated by Anti-Jacksonian Party candidate Philip Doddridge. Leffler's term in the U.S. House lasted from March 4, 1827, to March 3, 1829.

== Iowa career ==
In 1835, Leffler moved to the area that is now Burlington, Des Moines County, Iowa—then part of the Michigan Territory. At the time, Iowa and the other regions of the Michigan Territory west of the Mississippi River were broadly divided between Des Moines County in the south and Dubuque County in the north.

Leffler was admitted to the Des Moines County bar on April 15, 1835, and practiced law. While under Michigan's regional governance, he was named as the chief justice of the first judicial tribunal of Des Moines County on April 11, 1836. After the creation of Wisconsin Territory on April 20, 1836, he served in the first legislature of the new Territory from 1836 through 1838, and served as Speaker of the House during the 2nd session of the Assembly, in the winter of 1837–38.

After Iowa Territory was created from areas of Wisconsin Territory west of the Mississippi River—previously referred to as the Iowa District—in 1838, he served as a member of the Iowa Territory house of representatives in 1841.

President John Tyler appointed Leffler as United States marshal for the district of Iowa on December 18, 1843. He served until removed by President James K. Polk on December 29, 1845, when he resumed the practice of law in Burlington. He declined the appointment of the register of the land office at Stillwater (in what was then Minnesota Territory) in 1849. He was appointed by President Millard Fillmore as receiver of public sums of money for the Chariton land district of Iowa on August 30, 1852, and served on that position until removed by President Franklin Pierce on March 29, 1853.

He died in Chariton, Iowa, on March 8, 1866, at age 77. He was interred in Aspen Grove Cemetery, in Burlington.

Virginia House of Delegates
Preceded by Alexander Caldwell & William Irwin	Member of the Virginia House of Delegates from the Ohio district December 1, 1817 – December 6, 1819; Served alongside: William Irwin (1817–1818) & Moses W. Chapline (1818–1819)	Succeeded by William Irwin & William Chapline
Preceded by Adam Faris & James Shannon	Member of the Virginia House of Delegates from the Ohio district December 1, 1823 – November 29, 1824; Served alongside: Adam Faris	Succeeded by William McKinley & Zachariah Jacob
Preceded by William McKinley & Zachariah Jacob	Member of the Virginia House of Delegates from the Ohio district December 5, 1825 – December 3, 1827; Served alongside: William McKinley (1825–1826) & Morgan Nelson (1826–1827)	Succeeded by Samuel H. Fitzhugh & John Parrott
Preceded by Samuel H. Fitzhugh & John Parrott	Member of the Virginia House of Delegates from the Ohio district December 3, 1832 – December 2, 1833; Served alongside: John Parrott	Succeeded by John Parrott & John McLure
U.S. House of Representatives
Preceded by Joseph Johnson	Member of the U.S. House of Representatives from Virginia's 18th congressional district March 4, 1827 - March 3, 1829	Succeeded by Philip Doddridge
