= Lucius H. Langworthy =

Lead miner, businessman, banker and local politician

Lucius H. Langworthy (February 1807 – June 9, 1865) was an American lead miner, businessman, banker and local politician from Dubuque, Iowa who held public office in Michigan Territory, Wisconsin Territory and Iowa Territory.

== Background ==
He was born at Hopkinton, New York, in February. 1807. In 1827, with his brother James, he engaged in lead mining in Illinois, and in 1830 came to what would become Dubuque (then still part of Michigan Territory) for the same purpose, supposedly the first white settlers in that area since the death of Julien Dubuque. The two Langworthy brothers were becoming wealthy from their mining interests, and were joined by brothers Edward and Solon around this time. In 1832, with other squatters, they were compelled to leave by soldiers from Fort Crawford who occupied or burned the structures which had been erected in violation of indigenous treaty rights (the four brothers had built a house [possibly the first in Iowa] and a smelting furnace and had made about 2,000 "pigs" (ingots) of lead by the time of the raid). The Langworthys and other squatters returned during the winter of 1833 and at first lived in brush shanties on islands in the river while rebuilding.

== Public office ==
In 1834 Lucius was appointed as the first sheriff of Dubuque County, by the governor of Michigan territory. He served a brief term in the 1st Wisconsin Territorial Assembly as a member of the House of Representatives (lower house) from Dubuque County after the resignation of Alexander W. McGregor, just before the former Iowa District became the separate Iowa Territory. His brother Edward represented Dubuque for two one-year terms in the legislature of Iowa Territory.

== Personal and civil life ==
He invested in the Dubuque Visitor, said to be the first newspaper west of the Mississippi and north of St. Louis, Missouri. He was one of the early town fathers and as such did much to finance the town and all harbor movements. He and some miners helped to build the first schoolhouse in 1833, and in 1838 Langworthy was made one of the trustees of a newly-chartered Dubuque Seminary and Academy by the legislature. The four brothers were associated under various businesses and corporate structures, and by 1854, they and firms under their ownership owned one-twelfth of all the real estate in Dubuque. Lucius remained interested in mineral rights, and like his brother Edward was a strong advocate of railroads, serving as president of the abortive Dubuque and Keokuk Railroad.

In 1835 he married Mary F. Ruder, with whom he had two sons. In 1842 he married Valeria A. Bemis, with whom he had an additional six children. He died June 9, 1865; the funeral was reportedly the largest ever held in Dubuque up to that time.
