= Thomas McCraney =

American settler in early Iowa

Thomas McCraney (July 22, 1791 - May 21, 1855) was an Iowa settler who served as a member of the 1st Wisconsin Territorial Assembly during the era when the Iowa District was still part of Wisconsin Territory. He later served in the 1846 Iowa constitutional convention.
