= Joseph B. Teas =

American lawyer (1800–1872)

Joseph Bartlett Teas (July 4, 1800 - February 23, 1872) was an American lawyer and minister from Mt. Pleasant, Iowa. He served in the legislatures of three Territories of the United States without ever moving.

Teas was born July 4, 1800, in Nashville, Tennessee. At the age of 13, during the War of 1812 he accompanied his father to the front and was allowed to serve as a teamster, earning a land grant and a pension. After the war, he moved to Beardstown, Illinois, then to Fort Edwards, where he worked for the U.S. Army doing civil surveying of Illinois and what would become Wisconsin Territory. He and his brother moved to Iowa ca. 1833. He married Julia Ann (called "Juliann") Edwards in 1836.

Prior to becoming an attorney, Teas (like his brother George W. Teas) had been a Methodist minister; and both Teas brothers would later return to that vocation, although other accounts only say that George did so. On October 27, 1838, the Teas brothers advertised in the Iowa Territorial Gazette that while they had formerly practiced law in Burlington they were now in Mount Pleasant.

== Legislative career ==
On October 5, 1835, Teas was elected as a member of the 7th Michigan Territorial Council (the so-called "Rump Council" for those parts of the former Michigan Territory which were not to be part of the new State of Michigan), representing (along with Jeremiah Smith, Jr.) what was then Des Moines or Demoins County (the southern portion of the Iowa District). The session met in Green Bay on January 1, 1836; Smith and Teas made the journey on horseback, in mid-winter through deep snows. He was one of the nine (out of 13) members who actually attended, and was elected President pro tempore for the first day of the brief meeting.

He served one term as a member of the Council (Legislature of the Wisconsin Territory), representing Des Moines County of Wisconsin Territory in the 1st Wisconsin Territorial Assembly.

Upon the creation of Iowa Territory, he (along with his brother) was among the twenty lawyers admitted to the practice of law during the first term of the Supreme Court of Iowa Territory.

He later served as a Democratic member of the 5th upper house ("Council" or "Senate") district (Jefferson County) in the 5th and 6th Legislative Assemblies of Iowa Territory (December 5, 1842 - February 17, 1843; December 4, 1843 - February 16, 1844). He succeeded William Greyer Coop, a fellow Democrat, in the 5th Assembly, and Coop in turn succeeded Teas in the 7th Assembly.

== Later years ==
Teas eventually returned to the ministry. He died February 23, 1872, leaving his widow and twelve surviving children (at least three daughters had pre-deceased him).
