= James P. Cox =

American politician (1804–1866)

James Pitman Cox (January 9, 1804 – March 28, 1866; middle name sometimes spelled Pittman) was a tanner, farmer, sheriff and judge from Grant County, Wisconsin.

== Background ==
Cox was born in Philadelphia, Pennsylvania in 1802. He was orphaned at the age of eight, and was raised by a Quaker family. He received a rudimentary education, then was apprenticed to a tanner. Dissatisfied with tanning, in 1824 he migrated to Wisconsin Territory, settling in an area then part of Iowa County, but which would later become Grant County, and in 1832 was a second lieutenant in the Black Hawk War. He married Caroline Dawson, a native of Shawneetown, Illinois, with whom he would eventually have nine children; they finally settled on a farm in a settlement near Potosi in Grant County, where in April 1839 he filed a plat with an extensive plan for a city to be called Osceola, which never materialized. A ferry landing was established at Osceola, and Cox and his partner Justus Parsons were granted authority to run a ferry to cross the Grant River and then the Mississippi River to a place called Parsons Landing in what would soon be declared Iowa Territory, which ferry would run for some years to come.

== Public affairs ==
He served as sheriff for a jurisdiction encompassing what would later become Grant, Iowa and Crawford counties. He served as a probate judge for the county (originally an appointive position). He represented the then Iowa County in the House of Representatives of the 1st Wisconsin Territorial Assembly from 1836-1838 as a Whig. In 1842 he was a Whig nominee for the Territory's Council (equivalent to a state senate), but lost the race. In 1842, 1846 and 1848, he was elected as a Whig to the county commission, and served as its chairman in 1842 and 1848. In early 1848, he was nominated for the new Wisconsin State Assembly's 4th Grant County district, which included the districts of Hurricane, New Lisbon, Pleasant Valley, Potosi and Waterloo, losing to Democrat Arthur W. Worth.

== Later years ==
He had acquired 400 acres of government land in the area of Lancaster in Grant County, and returned to farming. In 1853, he presided over the first successful county fair in the county, and took prizes himself in such categories as "best four-year-old stallion" and "best three-year-old mare." He joined the new Republican Party soon after it was formed in Wisconsin, and labored to organize it there. He died at his home in Lancaster on March 28, 1866. Caroline Dawson Cox died in 1901. They are both buried in Hillside Cemetery in Lancaster.
