= Allen Hill (physician) =

American physician

Allen Hill was an American physician from Dubuque County in the Iowa District of what was first the Michigan Territory, then the Wisconsin Territory, and eventually the Iowa Territory. He was elected to the last legislature of the old Michigan Territory to represent his district; but did not attend.

== Background ==
Hill is recorded as settling with his family in the region around Dubuque, at that time a primitive but booming mining and smelting settlement, in 1833, and was one of only two physicians in the region when a cholera epidemic swept through that summer.

== Public office ==
In 1835, those parts of Michigan Territory who were not set to become part of the new State of Michigan were invited to elect members to a seventh and last Michigan Territorial Council. The citizens of Dubuque County (the north half of the Iowa District) in October elected Hill and John Parker, but due to concerns about the irregularity of their election they did not attend what came to be called the "Rump Council" when it met (briefly) in January 1836. Parker would later publish a statement that his failure to appear "was very satisfactory, to those who elected me at the time", since a proclamation had apparently been issued moving up the meeting date to one which neither Hill nor Parker would be able to attend. Parker was a Democrat, but Hill's affiliation is unknown.
