= David Rorer =

American lawyer

David Rorer (May 12, 1806 – July 7, 1884) was a lawyer, judge, sometime politician, author and anti-slavery advocate from Burlington, Iowa, who played a prominent role in the early history of Burlington and in Iowa legal history, and is credited with bestowing the nickname of "Hawkeyes" upon Iowans.

== Early life ==
Rorer was born May 12, 1806, son of Abraham Rorer and Nancy (Cook) Rorer, on their farm in Pittsylvania County, Virginia. He attended the local schools, and eventually read law under local attorneys Nathaniel H. Claiborne and Henry Calaway for two years. In 1826 he was admitted to the bar and moved to Little Rock, Arkansas Territory, where he took up practice. He owned the ferry in Little Rock. A 1908 history states, "he kept a good house of entertainment" on the city's north side, and entertained Territorial Governor John Pope. By the census of 1830, he owned seven slaves, which marked him among the elite of the region. In 1831, he was elected county judge of Pulaski County.

== Going north ==
According to an account by his daughter Delia, "Still under 30 years of age, he was rapidly making a name for himself in the South, but he found himself entirely out of sympathy with the people over the slavery issue." After a discussion around 1835 with an unnamed member of Congress in which the Congressman predicted the South would break away from the union, Rorer and his wife Martha elected to "throw in with the free North and the Union," Delia wrote. Rorer freed his slaves and offered to take them with his family beyond the reach of slavery. Only one came with the family: the children's nurse, called "Nin". The family and Nin left Little Rock for St. Louis, Missouri, intending to settle in Rock Island, Illinois. But during their time in St. Louis, Rorer became friends with Jean-Pierre Chouteau, a prominent merchant and Indian trader, who recommended a settlement called Shoqoquon, also known as Flint Hills, in the newly-opened Black Hawk Purchase (part of Wisconsin Territory).

The Rorers arrived in Flint Hills in 1836 on the steamboat Olive Branch. On the voyage, Rorer met Jackson Kemper, Episcopal Missionary Bishop of the Northwest, and eventually convinced the bishop to establish a mission in the area.

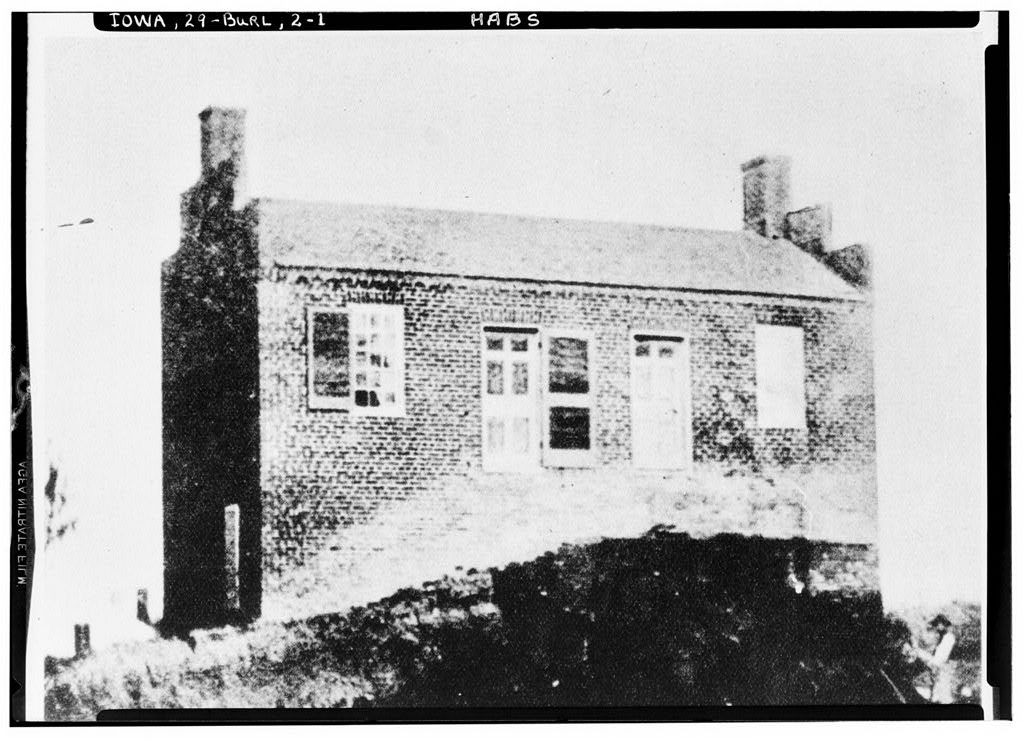
Judge David Rorer House, first brick house built in Iowa, circa 1837

The family and Nin first occupied a two-room log cabin, but within months Rorer had commissioned a brick house, the first to be built in what became the state of Iowa.

== Public office ==
On July 4, 1838, part of the Iowa District of Wisconsin Territory was split off to form Iowa Territory. Rorer (newly widowed) ran for Territorial Delegate to the 26th United States Congress. He eventually came in fourth out of nine candidates, with 605 votes (13.53% of the total), to fellow Democrats William W. Chapman's 1,490 (33.32%) and Peter H. Engle 1,454 (32.51%) and Whig Benjamin F. Wallace's 913 (20.42%). During the campaign, Rorer condemned "a damned Pennsylvania faction" within the Democratic Party, which was taken as a slam against Engle and his fellow Pennsylvania native, local journalist (co-founder of The Gazette, now The Hawk Eye) and politician Cyrus S. Jacobs. On October 31, 1838 (ten days after the election), Jacobs and Rorer ran into each other on a Burlington street. When Rorer refused to apologize for his remarks, Jacobs pulled a gun, then struck Rorer with his cane; Rorer drew his own pistol and fired, killing Jacobs (who had won election to the territorial legislature in the same election which Rorer lost). It was ruled that Rorer had acted in self-defense, but he vowed, "I will never again campaign for election."

== Private life ==
In March of 1827 in Little Rock he married Martha Martin, a Georgia-born widow (whose husband had owned the aforementioned ferry and inn on the north side of the city), with whom he had two sons and two daughters. Martha died in 1838, and in 1839 Rorer married Delia M. Viele of Scott County, Iowa, with whom he had three daughters.
