= 1867 United States Senate election in Wisconsin =

- January 23, 1867
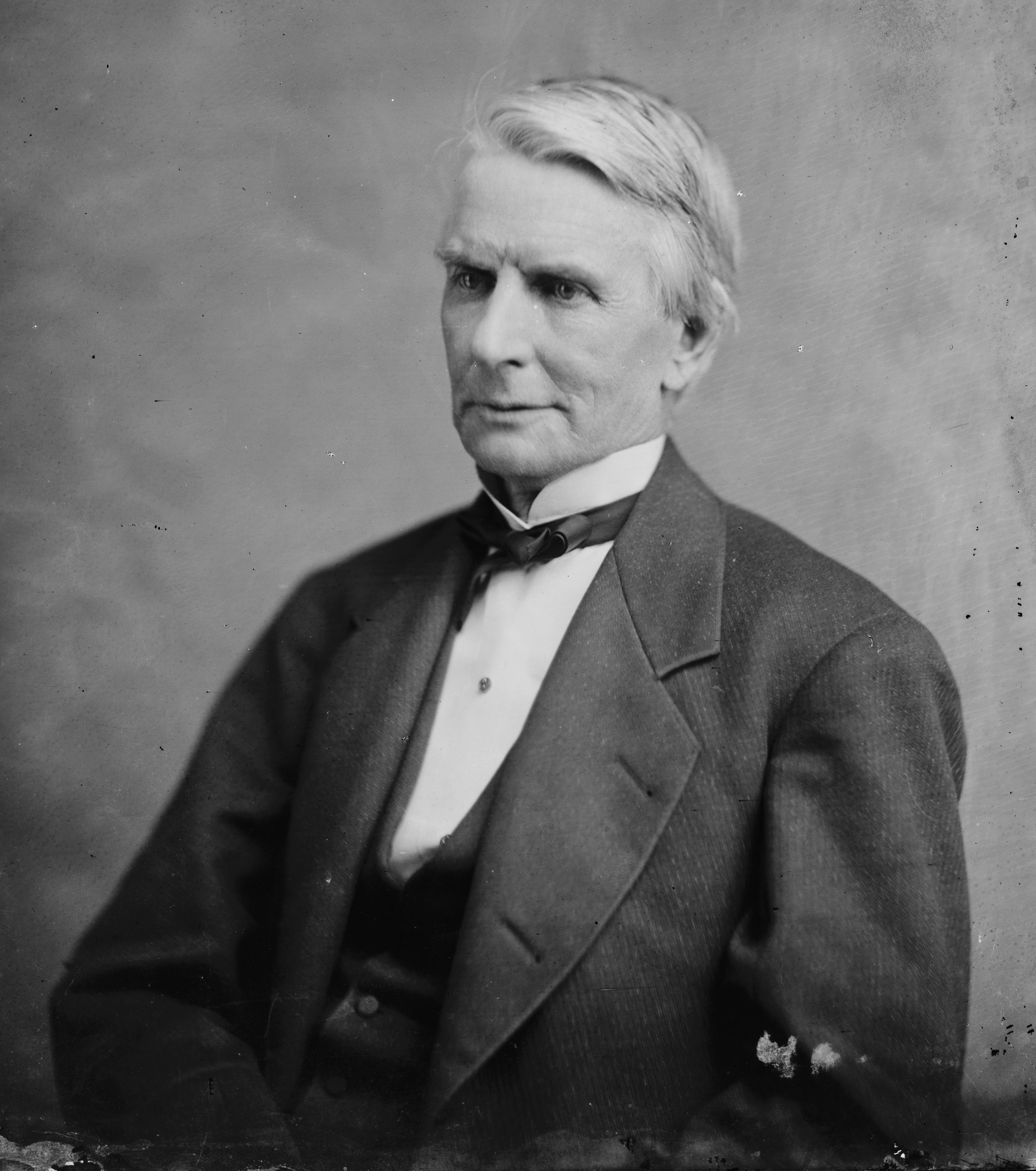

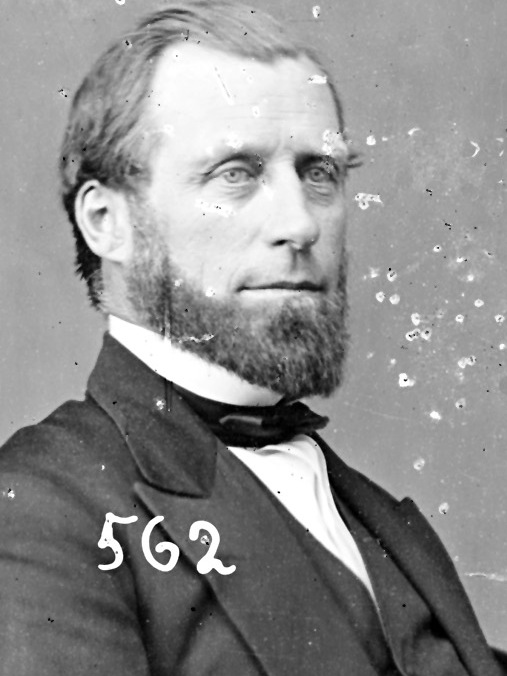
Nominee	Timothy O. Howe	Charles A. Eldredge	others
Party	Republican	Democratic
Legislative vote	95	31	2
Percentage	74.22%	24.22%	1.56%
U.S. senator before election
Timothy O. Howe
Republican
Elected U.S. Senator
Timothy O. Howe
Republican

The 1867 United States Senate election in Wisconsin was held in the 20th Wisconsin Legislature on January 23, 1867. Incumbent Republican U.S. senator Timothy O. Howe was re-elected on the first ballot.

At the start of the 1867 term, Republicans held large majorities in both chambers of the Wisconsin Legislature, bolstered by the National Union Party coalition, and were easily able to re-elect their incumbent U.S. senator. His re-election was considered a foregone conclusion in newspapers, and there doesn't appear to have been any other candidates for the Republican nomination.

== Major candidates ==
=== Democratic ===
- Charles A. Eldredge, incumbent U.S. representative of Wisconsin's 4th congressional district.

=== Republican ===
- Timothy O. Howe, incumbent U.S. senator, former Wisconsin circuit court judge from Green Bay.

== Results ==
The 20th Wisconsin Legislature met in joint session on January 23, 1867, to elect a U.S. senator. The voting was almost entirely along party lines, with one Republican and four Democratic members absent. Of the 128 in attendance, Timothy O. Howe received the votes of all but one of the Republican and Union legislators, winning the election.

1st Vote of the 20th Wisconsin Legislature, January 23, 1867
Party	Candidate	Votes	%
Republican	Timothy O. Howe (incumbent)	95 (Note: Howe received the votes of all National Union (Republican) members except representatives Joseph A. Frost (who was absent) and Joseph Wedig (who voted for Eldredge); he also received one cross-over vote from Democratic senator Matthew J. Meade.)	74.22%
Democratic	Charles A. Eldredge	31 (Note: Eldredge received the votes of all Democrats except senators Matthew J. Meade and Gerrit T. Thorn and representative Harrison Carroll Hobart (who voted for others), and representatives George W. Clason, Charles D. Gage, Charles H. Miller, and Thomas Robinson (who were absent); he also received one cross-over vote from Republican representative Joseph Wedig.)	24.22%
Democratic	Edward S. Bragg	1 (Note: Democratic senator Gerrit T. Thorn voted for Edward S. Bragg.)	0.78%
Democratic	Joshua J. Guppey	1 (Note: Democratic representative Harrison Carroll Hobart voted for Joshua J. Guppey.)	0.78%
	Absent	5	
Majority		65	50.78%
Total votes		128	96.24%
Republican hold			
