= John F. Meade =

19th century American politician

Member of the Wisconsin State Assembly from the Brown County district
- In office January 1, 1849 – January 7, 1850
- Preceded by: David Agry
- Succeeded by: Charles D. Robinson

Personal details
- Born: September 20, 1819 Harrisburg, Pennsylvania, U.S.
- Died: May 6, 1850 (aged 30) Brown County, Wisconsin, U.S.
- Cause of death: Suspicious death
- Resting place: Woodlawn Cemetery, Allouez, Wisconsin
- Party: Democratic
- Spouse: Mary Frances Lawe (m. 1841–1850)
- Children: Edward Lawe Meade; (b. 1843; died 1869)
- Relatives: Matthew J. Meade (brother)

John Francis Meade (September 20, 1819 – May 6, 1850) was an American farmer, land speculator, Democratic politician, and Wisconsin pioneer. He served one term in the Wisconsin State Assembly, representing Brown County during the 2nd Wisconsin Legislature (1849), and served a year as register of the U.S. land office at Menasha, Wisconsin. Before Wisconsin statehood, he also served several years as county clerk of Brown County, at a time when Brown County comprised much of the northeast quadrant of the Wisconsin Territory.

Meade died under suspicious circumstances in 1850; a local controversy ensued, as many in the community believed he had been murdered. The mystery was never definitively resolved.

== Biography ==
Meade was born in Harrisburg, Pennsylvania, on September 20, 1819, the child of Irish American immigrants. His mother died in 1829, leaving two sons and two daughters. The girls went to stay with relatives, then into a residential school. In 1834, John's oldest sister, Catherine, moved to Green Bay in the Wisconsin Territory to teach at a newly-established Catholic parochial school there. She was soon married, and brought her father and all her siblings to Wisconsin with dispatch.

In May 1839, John Meade was among those residents of Wisconsin Territory who signed a petition to hold regional and then territory-conventions to nominate candidates for Delegate to Congress. In the October 1841 general election, he was elected as the Democratic candidate for county clerk with a 55-vote margin of victory. His name recurs under that title on legal notices in 1842, 1843, and 1844; and we may reasonably suspect that he had been re-elected. In September 1844 he was again elected on the Democratic ticket as county clerk for Brown County.

He served as the register of the United States General Land Office in Menasha, Wisconsin, from March 8, 1847, to June 15, 1848. "The long shelves were loaded down with massive tomes containing the land descriptions and the history of each quarter section with maps and diagrams of hundreds of thousands of acres, and the corners were piled high with boxes and barrels of letters and documents, the accumulation of half a century... In these dingy, dirty, dark dens were transacted land sales of half Wisconsin, of fabulous value now; and for which the receiver of the land office took in over the pine board counter... the daily receipts of which he kept in a tin pan of a safe that could have been cracked open with a hammer."

In the fall of 1848, he was elected to represent Brown County, replacing fellow Democrat David Agry. When he assumed office in the Assembly in January 1849, he is reported to have been 28 years old, a farmer originally from Pennsylvania who had been in Wisconsin twelve years. He was succeeded for the 1850 session by fellow Democrat Charles D. Robinson.

In February 1850 he was one of nine investors in The Two Rivers and Green Bay Plank Road Company, with a capital stock of $100,000 to build a plank road from Two Rivers to Green Bay.

== Personal life and family ==
John Meade was a son of David P. Meade and his wife Lydia (née Wilde). Both parents were Irish immigrants, originally from Dublin.

John's sister Catherine, who had summoned the family to Wisconsin, married George W. Lawe, the son of Judge John Lawe and his half-Menominee wife, Sophia Therese (née Rankin). John Lawe was a prominent fur trader and associate judge for Brown County, who had come to Wisconsin from Canada in 1797. On December 7, 1842, John was appointed Assistant Clerk of the House of Representatives of the Wisconsin Territory.

Lawe also had a daughter, Mary "Polly" Lawe. John Meade married Mary Lawe on November 6, 1841, in Brown County. They had at least two sons. As a result of his wife and sons' Menominee heritage, Meade received $150 on their behalf under the terms of Article 4 of the treaty of October 18, 1848, between the United States and the Menominee Indians.

Meade's younger brother, Matthew J. Meade, also went on to a notable career in Wisconsin, serving as a Wisconsin state senator, and serving as a Union Army officer in the American Civil War.

On May 6, 1850, a house in a local shanty town burnt down, and the body of Meade was discovered in the rubble. Contemporary accounts differed as to what had happened to him, but his gold watch was missing, and locals asserted that he had been robbed and murdered, and that his body had been discovered under a pile of straw.

During his career in real estate, on September 7, 1847, Meade sold 149.18 acres of undeveloped land to Amos A. Lawrence, to establish the school that would become Lawrence University. Meade's contract with the buyer contained a condition that the school would be built on that land and would remain there. Shortly after Meade's death, the buildings of the Lawrence Institute—as it was known at the time—burned down, and the trustees of the school decided to relocate to another nearby location. The trustees then bolstered their endowment by selling much of Meade's original 149 acres, which had become valuable property in the middle of the growing village of Appleton, Wisconsin—in fact, all of what became the business district of the city of Appleton sits within that original 149 acre tract. Meade's son and heir, Edward Lawe Meade, determined that these actions violated the terms of the original land sale, and sued to have the land restored to his ownership. Meade lost at the U.S. district court, but chose to pursue appeals up to the U.S. Supreme Court, which ultimately affirmed the lower court, in the case known as Mead v. Ballard (74 U.S. 290).

Wisconsin State Assembly
Preceded by David Agry	Member of the Wisconsin State Assembly from the Brown County district January 1, 1849 – January 7, 1850	Succeeded by Charles D. Robinson
