= 7th Michigan Territorial Council =

1836 Meeting of the legislative body governing Michigan Territory

←	6th	1st Wisconsin Territorial Assembly	→

Overview
- Legislative body: Michigan Territorial Council
- Jurisdiction: Michigan Territory
- Term: January 1, 1836 – January 15, 1836

Michigan Territorial Council
- Members: 13 members
- President: William S. Hamilton

Sessions
- 1st: January 1, 1836 – January 15, 1836

The Seventh Michigan Territorial Council, also known as the Rump Council, was a meeting of the legislative body governing Michigan Territory in January 1836, during the term of Acting Governor John S. Horner. At the time, most of Michigan Territory was awaiting admission to the union as the state of Michigan and had already seated its new state legislature. This was the final session of the Council and consisted only of members from the "contingent remainder" or "rump territory"—the remaining counties that formed the new Wisconsin Territory later that year.

== Background ==
A constitutional convention in May 1835 drafted a new state constitution for the portion of Michigan Territory that makes up the modern state of Michigan. At the same election in which the constitution was ratified on October 5, 1835, voters elected the first members of the Michigan Legislature, which was set to take over legislative power from the territorial council. In order to ensure that the remainder of the territory was not left without representative government during the transition period, at its final session before the convention, the council had authorized Territorial Secretary and Acting Governor Stevens T. Mason to apportion seats on the next council among the counties not covered by the new constitution. He did so in a proclamation on August 25, 1835, which called for the reconfigured council to meet in Green Bay on January 1, 1836.

Shortly after Mason's proclamation, President Andrew Jackson replaced him as secretary with John S. Horner, who also became acting governor. Horner issued a proclamation of his own on November 9, 1835, calling on the council to meet in Green Bay a month sooner, on December 1. Travel conditions made it difficult to make the trip to Green Bay on such short notice, and the newly-elected members apparently each spontaneously decided to ignore Horner's proclamation and instead meet on the previously-announced date of January 1, 1836.

== Session ==
Nine of the 13 elected members of the council attended the session in Green Bay beginning January 1, which was sufficient to constitute a quorum. Acting Governor Horner did not travel to Green Bay for either his own December 1 meeting date or the January 1 date, but sent a letter on December 30 explaining his absence, which meant that the council could not take up any legislative business.

The council adjourned sine die on January 15, 1836. The Territory of Wisconsin was created on July 3 of that year, with a new bicameral legislature; the 1st Wisconsin Territorial Legislature convened on October 25.

== Leadership and organization ==
On January 2, 1836, William S. Hamilton (son of Alexander Hamilton) was elected president of the council, Albert Gallatin Ellis secretary, Thomas A. B. Boyd recording clerk, William B. Long enrolling clerk, Levi Sterling sergeant-at-arms, W. H. Bruce doorkeeper, and Charles Green and George W. Lawe messenger and assistant messenger, respectively.

The council debated whether it was worthwhile to appoint standing committees, given the absence of Acting Governor Horner; they elected to create the following committees in order to be prepared in case the governor did arrive:

- Claims: Lawe, Smith, Vineyard
- Enrollment: Burnett, Edgerton, Vineyard
- Expenses: Edgerton, Knapp, Slaughter
- Judiciary: Burnett, Edgerton, Slaughter
- Militia: Slaughter, Smith, Teas
- Schools: Knapp, Smith, Teas
- Territorial Affairs: Burnett, Edgerton, Teas

== Members ==
The apportionment of seats on the council among the counties of the "rump territory" was determined by Mason's August 25, 1835, proclamation, and the election of members took place on October 5, 1835.

Members
District	County	Name	Party	Notes
1	Brown; Milwaukee	Benjamin Hyde Edgerton		
1	Brown; Milwaukee	Gilbert Knapp	Whig	
1	Brown; Milwaukee	John Lawe		
1	Brown; Milwaukee	William B. Slaughter		
1	Brown; Milwaukee	George H. Walker	Dem.	Did not appear at session
2	Iowa	William S. Hamilton	Whig	
2	Iowa	Robert C. Hoard		Did not appear at session; elected October 5, resigned October 9, 1835
2	Iowa	James Russell Vineyard	Dem.	
3	Crawford	Thomas P. Burnett	Dem.	
4	Dubuque	Allen Hill		Did not appear at session
4	Dubuque	John Parker	Dem.	Did not appear at session
5	Des Moines	Jeremiah Smith Jr.	Dem.	
5	Des Moines	Joseph B. Teas	Dem.	
