= Thomas McKnight =

Thomas McKnight is a personal name. It may refer to:

- Thomas McKnight (artist), American painter
- Thomas McKnight (Iowa pioneer), Iowa lawyer, businessman and politician
- Thomas McKnight (Wisconsin pioneer), Wisconsin local pioneer and local politician
- Tom McKnight (1868–1930) English footballer

== See also ==
- Thomas MacKnight (disambiguation)
