= Potosi Brewery =

- U.S. National Register of Historic Places
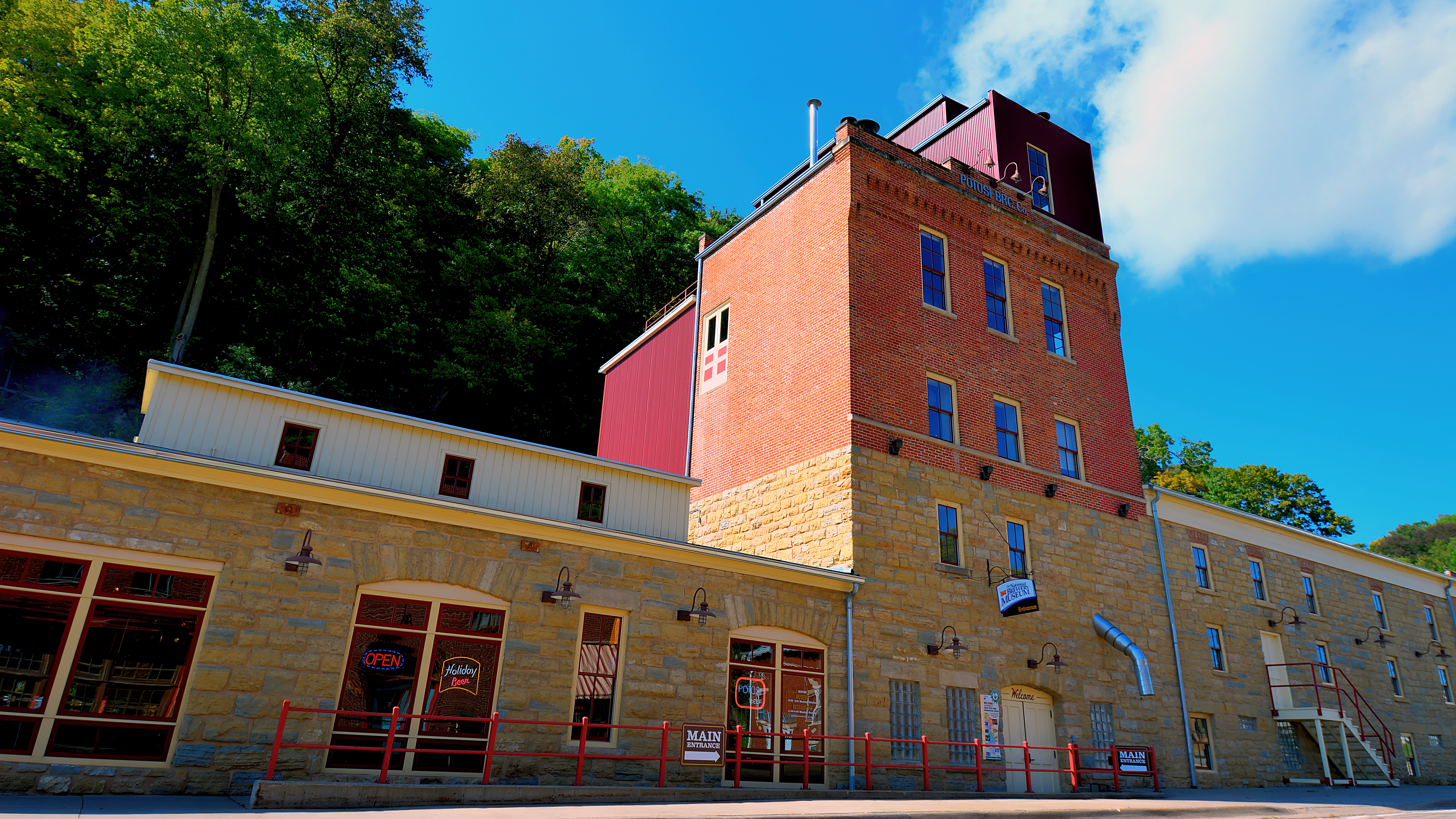

- Location within Wisconsin Location within the United States
- Location: Main St., Potosi, Wisconsin, United States
- Coordinates: 42°40′37″N 90°43′32″W
- Area: 3.5 acres (1.4 ha)
- Built: 1890
- NRHP reference No.: 80000138
- Added to NRHP: November 19, 1980

The Potosi Brewery is located in Potosi, Wisconsin, United States. It was added to the National Register of Historic Places in 1980.

== History ==
Beer began being brewed in the building in 1852 by Gabriel Hail and John Albrecht. In 1886, the building was bought by Adam Schumacher. The Potosi Brewing Company was officially founded by Schumacher and his brothers, Nicholas and Henry, in 1906. Beer was brewed in one building and piped underground to a bottling facility across the street. At its peak, it was the fifth-largest brewer in the United States. During Prohibition, the Potosi Brewery produced nonalcoholic beer by brewing beer and boiling the alcohol out of it. They also bottled milk from the company's farm.

In 1972, the brewery ceased operations. Gary David purchased the building, damaged by a fire, at auction for $6,300 in 1995. He donated it to the Potosi Foundation in 2001 and the brewery property was officially transferred. The Potosi Brewing Company building re-opened as a museum and brewpub in 2008 following a $7.5 million restoration. The Potosi Foundation, a 501(c)(3) non-profit organization and sole owner of the Potosi Brewing Company, reopened the brewery in 2008. The Foundation is run by a board of elected volunteers and donates its profits to charity.

== Production ==
In 2015, the business opened a new production facility, in addition to the museum and brewpub. It produced around 8,000 barrels of beer per year with the capacity to brew 20,000. Prior to that, beer was being brewed at Stevens Point Brewery.

The brewery uses caves attached to the original building to age some of its products. In 2017, they expanded distribution to retailers in Iowa. In addition to their own brand, the brewery is also contracted to produce beer for other manufacturers.

== Museums ==
In 2004, it was chosen as the site of the National Brewery Museum by the American Breweriana Association and operates on a long-term lease for the building. The museum opened in June 2008, displaying materials related to the production and promotion of American beers. As of 2018, the museum saw approximately 65,000 visitors annually.

The site also features the Potosi Brewing Company Transportation Museum, with historic vehicles and displays about the area transportation of beer to customers. It is part of the Great River Road, a network of museums and interpretive centers that cover the history of transportation on the Mississippi River. The brewery itself once used a ferry to transport beer downriver to Dubuque, Iowa.
