= Jeremiah Smith Jr. =

American settler (1802–1862)

Jeremiah Smith Jr. (March 23, 1802 - February 28, 1862) was an early settler in what is now Burlington, Iowa but was then in the Iowa District of the Michigan Territory. He worked as a merchant and land speculator, and later became a farmer and grower of fruit trees. He served as a representative for Des Moines County (which then made up the southern portion of what would later become Iowa) in the council (the upper house) of the 1st Wisconsin Territorial Assembly, since at that time Iowa was part of Wisconsin Territory, from October 25, 1836, to June 25, 1838.

== Background ==
Born March 23, 1802, in Ohio, Smith came with his family to Illinois. He served in a mounted rifle brigade in 1832 during the Black Hawk War. It is unclear from the available sources whether the sobriquet "Major Smith" found in some Burlington-area historical documents refers to Jeremiah Smith Jr. or his father Jeremiah Sr. In late 1832, while the area around Burlington was still technically the property of the local Native American tribe, Smith and some others arrived, did some exploration and staked out land claims in an area about one and a half miles outside of what would become Burlington, where in later years Smith would have his farm. In early 1833, they returned and erected some buildings and made some improvements to the lands they claimed, but were allegedly driven out and the structures burned by United States Army troops out of Fort Armstrong on Rock Island under the command of Lt. Jefferson Davis, since the treaty with the Indians did not require them to yield possession of the land until June 1, 1833. The Smiths and other settlers returned to Burlington in late 1833 or very early 1834, while the Iowa District was still part of Michigan Territory. Smith had a farm about a mile and a half outside of town and owned property in town on Water Street along the Mississippi River, where he built a warehouse and a general store, which did its business with the Native Americans, and treated pelts as almost equivalent to cash money; he also got into land speculation.

== Public affairs ==
In 1835, those parts of Michigan Territory who were not set to become part of the new State of Michigan were invited to elect members to a seventh and last Michigan Territorial Council, known to history as the "Rump Council." The citizens of Demoins or Des Moines County (the south half of the Iowa District) in October elected Smith and Joseph B. Teas. The session met in Green Bay on January 1, 1836; Smith and Teas made the journey on horseback, in mid-winter through deep snows. He was one of the nine (of the thirteen elected) to actually attend the brief session.

Smith was a Council member from Des Moines County, and Peter Hill Engle was a Representative from Dubuque County (the northern half of what is now Iowa) and Speaker of the House, when the Wisconsin Territorial Legislature first met in Belmont, Wisconsin in 1836. Smith and other Iowans convinced the legislature to move the temporary seat of government to Burlington on the Iowa side of the Mississippi River by promising to build a capitol building with his own personal funds. The legislature passed a bill locating the seat of government at Burlington until March 4, 1839, unless buildings were to be completed sooner at Madison.

In the summer of 1837, Smith erected a two-story frame building that measured 40 feet by 70 feet, near his other properties on Water Street, at the cost of $8000. The Wisconsin Territorial Legislature convened in "Smith’s Capitol" in Burlington on November 6, 1837. The Council occupied the second story and the House of Representatives occupied the lower story. Each of the legislative chambers had a lobby separated from the chamber by a railing, was heated with hearths and a stove in the lobby. The Burlington newspaper described the building as “handsomely built” and a great improvement, as a desk was furnished for each member rather than a single table that was provided in Belmont.

On December 12, 1837, Smith's capitol building burned down along with seven other structures, including his other properties downtown on Water Street. He spent years trying to recoup his losses from the U.S. Government, asserting that the government owed him for the cost of the Capitol. Smith was not successful in convincing Washington that he should be reimbursed for a building he owned and had neglected to insure.

== Outside the legislature ==
During 1837, the Smiths' house operated as a boarding house, and one of their guests for an unknown number of weeks was the defeated Sauk war leader Black Hawk.

On July 4, 1838, Iowa became a territory; Smith appears not to have sought political after Iowa Territory was separated from Wisconsin, and did not serve in the Iowa Territorial Legislature or in the Iowa State Legislature after Iowa statehood. He was, however, among those signing a call for a Democratic Party meeting for Des Moines County in May 1844. He reportedly concentrated on farming until his death. He died February 28, 1862, and is buried in Aspen Grove Cemetery in Burlington with Ellen M. Smith (1806–1885).
