= Joseph Doddridge =

American historian and clergyman (1769–1826)

Joseph Doddridge (1769–1826) was an American historian and clergyman. His historical writings, including Notes on the Settlements and Indian Wars of the Western Parts of Virginia, document the experiences of early European settlers and their conflicts with Native American tribes, particularly the Mingo. As a minister, Doddridge established Episcopal congregations in the Upper Ohio Valley.

== Early life and education ==
Joseph Doddridge was born in 1769 near Bedford, Pennsylvania, and raised further west at Doddridge's Fort, located in an area disputed between Virginia and Pennsylvania, now part of Washington County, Pennsylvania. The family farm also included Doddridge's Chapel, a site frequently visited by Methodist circuit riders, including the bishop Francis Asbury.

His brother, Philip Doddridge, was a political advocate for western Virginians during the Virginia Constitutional Convention of 1829–1830.

As a young man, Doddridge initially pursued a career as an itinerant Methodist preacher, but later shifted his focus to medicine and the Episcopal ministry.

After his father died, Doddridge attended Canonsburg Academy (which later became Washington & Jefferson College), an institution affiliated with Scotch-Irish Presbyterians. He then traveled to Philadelphia, where he studied medicine and received theological training under the guidance of Bishop William White, preparing for ordination in the Episcopal Church.

== Ministry ==
Upon settling along Buffalo Creek, in what is now Wellsburg, West Virginia, Doddridge became a leader in the Episcopal Church, establishing congregations throughout the region. His efforts contributed to the formation of churches in what are now the dioceses of Pittsburgh, Ohio, Southern Ohio, Virginia, and West Virginia. Despite his advocacy, Doddridge was unsuccessful in his efforts to organize dioceses in rural Northern Appalachia, and his work was later overshadowed by the ministry of Bishop Philander Chase.

== Writings and legacy ==
Doddridge is most remembered for his historical writings, particularly Notes on the Settlements and Indian Wars of the Western Parts of Virginia (1824), which offers valuable insights into the life and struggles of early settlers in the region. His work is cited as a source for understanding the dynamics between European settlers and Native Americans during the late 18th century. In particular, Doddridge's 1821 play Logan, the Last of the Race of Shikellemus portrays the complex relationships between colonists and indigenous peoples. Some scholars note that Doddridge's perspective on colonial violence was more critical than that found in other contemporary accounts.

== Sources ==
- Richards, Samuel J. (2018). "The East-West Divide and Frontier Efforts of the Reverend Dr. Joseph Doddridge". Pennsylvania History: A Journal of Mid-Atlantic Studies. 85 (4): 460–487. doi:10.5325/pennhistory.85.4.0460. ISSN 0031-4528.
