= Philip Doddridge (Virginia politician) =

American politician

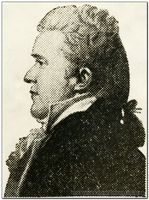
- Profile of Philip Doddridge

Member of the U.S. House of Representatives from Virginia's 18th district
- In office March 4, 1829 – November 19, 1832
- Preceded by: Isaac Leffler
- Succeeded by: Joseph Johnson

Chairman of the Committee on the District of Columbia
- In office 1829–1832
- Preceded by: Gershom Powers
- Succeeded by: George Corbin Washington

Member of the Virginia House of Delegates from Brooke County
- In office December 1, 1828 – 1829 Serving with Jesse Edgington
- Preceded by: Samuel Herdman
- Succeeded by: John Hindman
- In office December 2, 1822 – November 30, 1823 Serving with Robert Hartford
- Preceded by: Richard Brown
- Succeeded by: Jesse Edgington
- In office 1820–1821 Serving with John Edie
- Preceded by: John Edgington
- Succeeded by: Richard Brown
- In office December 4, 1815 – 1817 Serving with John Edie
- Preceded by: William Brown
- Succeeded by: William Brown

Member of the Virginia Senate from Monongalia, Ohio, Harrison, Randolph, Wood, and Brooke Counties
- In office 1804–1807
- Preceded by: Thomas Wilson
- Succeeded by: James Pindall

Personal details
- Born: May 17, 1773 Bedford County, Province of Pennsylvania, British America
- Died: November 19, 1832 (aged 59) Washington, D.C., U.S.
- Resting place: Congressional Cemetery, Washington, D.C.
- Party: Anti-Jacksonian
- Occupation: Attorney

Philip Doddridge (May 17, 1773 – November 19, 1832) was a Virginia lawyer and sectional leader of western (now West) Virginia. He served in the United States House of Representatives representing the Wheeling District in the Upper Ohio River Valley, as well as in both houses of the Virginia General Assembly.

His brother, Joseph Doddridge, was a prominent historian and Episcopal priest in the region.

== Early life and education ==
Philip Doddridge was born in Bedford County in the Province of Pennsylvania. He was the son of John and Mary Wells Doddridge. Doddridge grew up along Cross Creek at Doddridge's Fort in frontier Washington County, Pennsylvania, site of Doddridge's Chapel frequently visited by Methodist circuit riders including bishop Francis Asbury.

His education included tutoring from his father, attending Canonsburg Academy (a forerunner to Washington & Jefferson College), and reading law with mentors in Wellsburg. He also once traveled down the Mississippi River on a flatboat.

He married Juliana Parr Musser, and they had at least five sons who survived them. The family also owned at least household slaves.

== Career ==
In 1796, Doddridge settled downstream along the Ohio River at newly founded Wellsburg (then Charleston), Virginia (now West Virginia). He became active in civic affairs and in Trinity Episcopal Church founded by his brother, the Rev. Dr. Joseph Doddridge, a frontier author, physician and Episcopalian missionary.

He was admitted to at least the Virginia bar in 1797. Wellsburg was the county seat of Brooke County, Virginia (now West Virginia), and as a frontier lawyer, Doddridge also practiced in nearby counties of Pennsylvania, and Ohio specializing in land disputes common in his day. West Virginia founder Waitman T. Willey read law under Doddridge. Another of his students served as a Judge of the Missouri Supreme Court – Silas Bent Jr., father of William Bent and Charles Bent, the trader and first territorial Governor of New Mexico during the United States invasion and occupation of the Mexican territory during the Mexican-American War. Silas Jr. married Doddridge's cousin, Martha Kerr.

== Politics ==
From 1804 to 1809, Doddridge won election and re-election to the Senate of Virginia representing the six northwestern Virginia counties, but he resigned during what normally would have been his second four-year part time position after accepting a position as Commonwealth Attorney (prosecutor) for Brooke County. In 1815, Brooke County voters elected Brooke as one of their two representatives in the Virginia House of Delegates, and he would both win and lose re-election several times. Doddridge was a leading advocate for the Virginia Constitutional Convention of 1829–1830 during which he was the leading voice for western reformers seeking greater say in Richmond amid east-west sectionalism.

In 1822, he was an unsuccessful candidate to the Eighteenth Congress and in 1824 to the Nineteenth Congress, although he served in the Virginia House of Delegates. Reportedly, Daniel Webster said Doddrige was "the only man I really feared in debate." Doddridge was elected as an Anti-Jacksonian candidate to the Twenty-first and Twenty-second Congresses. During that time, he was an outspoken advocate of congressional authority during the 1832 Stanbery-Houston Affair. He was also chairman of the House Committee for the District of Columbia (Twenty-first and Twenty-second Congresses) tasked with codifying the district laws inherited from Maryland and Virginia. Doddridge served in the U.S. House of Representatives from March 4, 1829 and died in office.

== Family life ==
Philip Doddridge married Julia Parr Musser in Lancaster, Pennsylvania, on April 30, 1800. They had five sons and five daughters.

== Death and legacy ==
Doddridge fell ill and died in Washington, D.C., November 19, 1832. He was interred in the Congressional Cemetery. His student, Waitman Willey, wrote a sketch of his life, now held in Morgantown by the West Virginia and Regional History Center. Descendants later donated his papers (and those of his descendants) to the same entity.

Phillipsburg, Ohio, on the Ohio River, was originally named for Doddridge. After the Brilliant Glass Company located there in 1880, the town and railway station changed the town's name to Brilliant. Doddridge County, West Virginia is also named in his honor.

Limited research has been conducted regarding the life of Philip Doddridge. One historian has argued that historical accounts of Doddridge often feature inaccuracies due to reliance on primary sources from the Virginia Tidewater. In autumn 2019, an article in West Virginia History argued that: "Some historians have reduced Doddridge to a caricature by relying too heavily on sources laden with the anti-Appalachian views of Virginia’s eastern elites motivated by self-preservation of their plantation lifestyles reliant on black slavery. In other instances, historians omit Doddridge’s name from accounts of historical events in which he played a key role. Similarly, advocates for an independent West Virginia later used Doddridge to fit their own purpose to highlight western needs to separate from Richmond. These competing approaches continue to influence lopsided narratives that sometimes bizarrely exclude Philip Doddridge from summaries of the Virginia Constitutional Convention of 1829–30 for which he was a chief proponent and the leading reformer."

== See also ==
- List of members of the United States Congress who died in office (1790–1899)

U.S. House of Representatives
Preceded by Isaac Leffler	Member of the U.S. House of Representatives from Virginia's 18th congressional district March 4, 1829 - November 19, 1832	Succeeded by Joseph Johnson
