= Matthew J. Meade =

19th century American politician

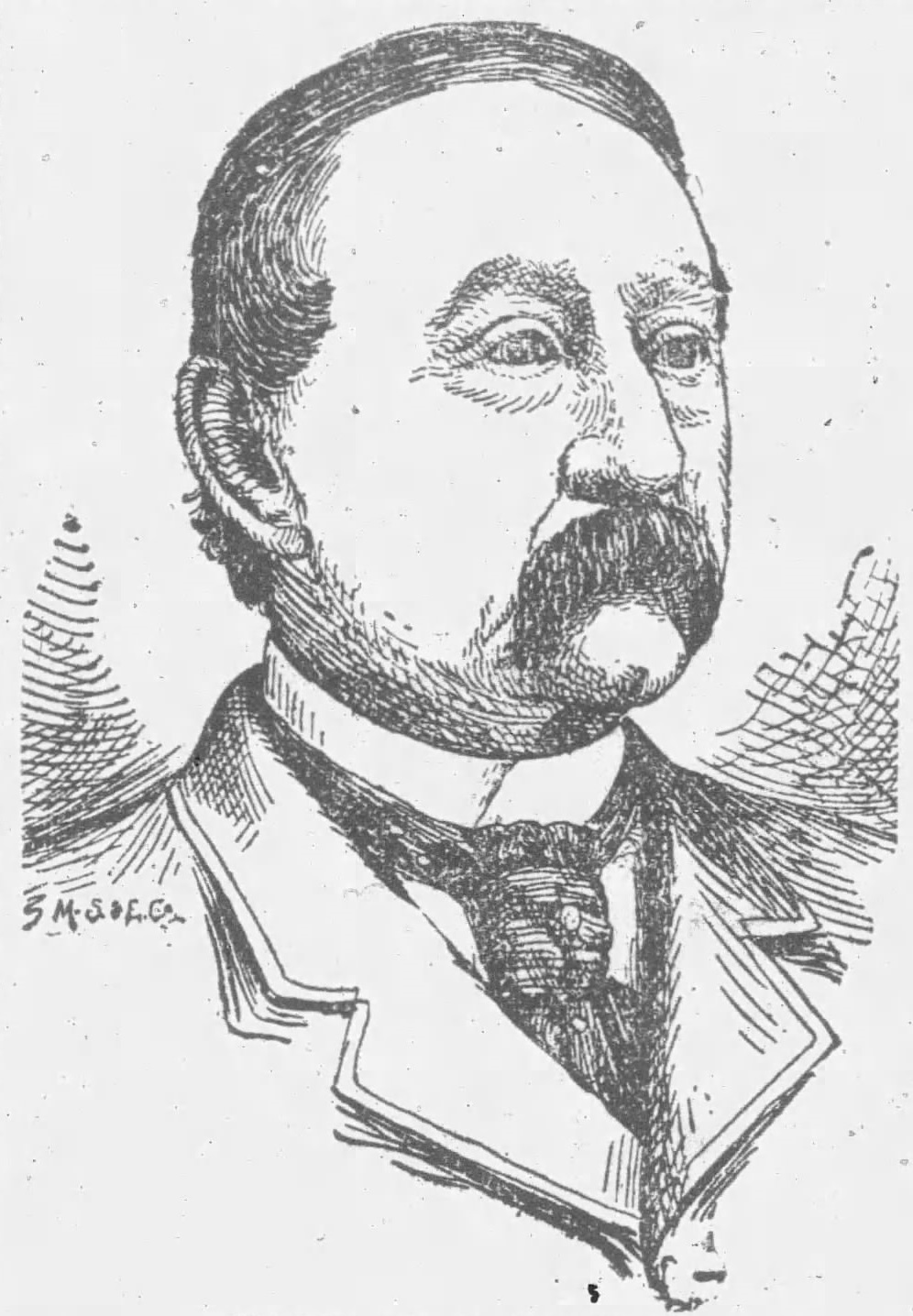
- From obituary in The Mining Times (May 7, 1896)

Clerk of Brown County, Wisconsin
- In office January 1, 1871 – January 1, 1881
- Preceded by: John B. Eugene
- Succeeded by: Patrick Ryan

Member of the Wisconsin Senate from the 2nd district
- In office January 1, 1866 – January 6, 1868
- Preceded by: Frederick S. Ellis
- Succeeded by: William J. Abrams

Personal details
- Born: December 7, 1823 Shippensburg, Pennsylvania, U.S.
- Died: April 21, 1896 (aged 72) Kaukauna, Wisconsin, U.S.
- Resting place: Woodlawn Cemetery, Allouez, Wisconsin
- Party: Democratic
- Spouse: Harriet Pelton (m. 1858–1896)
- Children: John Francis Meade; (b. 1861; died 1891)
- Relatives: John F. Meade (brother)
- Occupation: Farmer

Military service
- Allegiance: United States
- Branch/service: United States Volunteers (Union Army)
- Years of service: 1862–1864
- Rank: Captain, USV
- Unit: 32nd Reg. Wis. Vol. Infantry
- Battles/wars: American Civil War

Matthew James Meade (December 7, 1823 – April 21, 1896) was an American farmer, Democratic politician, and Wisconsin pioneer. He was a member of the Wisconsin Senate, representing Brown County during the 1866 and 1867 sessions. His former home in Kaukauna, Wisconsin, is listed in the National Register of Historic Places as the Capt. Matthew J. Meade House. His name was often abbreviated as M. J. Meade.

== Early life ==
Matthew J. Meade was born December 7, 1823, at Shippensburg, Pennsylvania. His mother died when he was a child, after which his sisters were sent to a seminary in Ohio. In 1834, his eldest sister, Catherine, went west to the frontier village of Green Bay, accompanying the Catholic bishop Frederick Rese, to serve as a teacher at a newly established Catholic school. Shortly after arriving, she married George W. Lawe, the son of the prominent and wealthy fur trader John Lawe. She then sent to her father and siblings and invited them to join her in the new territory. Matthew J. Meade arrived in Green Bay shortly before his 12th birthday, in 1835.

Meade was first elected to county office in 1858, when he was elected register of deeds of Brown County, running on the Democratic Party ticket. He was subsequently re-elected in 1860.

== Civil War service ==
Shortly after his second election, the American Civil War began. He served out the remainder of his term and in the Summer of 1862 began raising a company of volunteers for the Union Army. His company was enrolled as Company F in the 32nd Wisconsin Infantry Regiment, and Meade was commissioned their captain. The 32nd Wisconsin Infantry mustered into federal service on September 25, 1862, and left the state in October for service in the western theater of the war. They were assigned to William T. Sherman's corps and marched to join the Vicksburg campaign. During their march, however, they received word of the Holly Springs Raid and were ordered to return to Tennessee for provost duty. They remained in Tennessee until January 1864, when they were sent to Vicksburg to join the Meridian campaign through central Mississippi, then joined the Atlanta campaign into Georgia. They participated in the capture of Atlanta in the fall of 1864. Meade suffered injuries at Atlanta and resigned in November 1864.

== Postbellum career ==
In 1865, Meade ran for office again, as the Democratic Party nominee for Wisconsin Senate in the 2nd Senate district. At the time, the district comprised Brown and Kewaunee counties. He won the election and went on to serve in the 1866 and 1867 legislative sessions. He did not run for re-election in 1867.

He subsequently ran for county clerk in 1868, but lost the election to Republican John B. Eugene. He returned to run again in 1870, and this time won the office. He went on to serve five terms as clerk, leaving office in January 1881.

During the 1870s and 1880s, Meade became active in dealing real estate in the neighboring Outagamie County, and in 1885 he built an elaborate new mansion in Kaukauna, Wisconsin, where he resided for the rest of his life. He was active through his later years with the local posts of the Grand Army of the Republic.

Matthew J. Meade suffered a stroke in April 1896 and never recovered. He died at his home in Kaukauna on April 21, 1896.

== Personal life and family ==
Matthew J. Meade was the last of four children born to David P. Meade and his wife Lydia (née Wilde). Both parents were Irish American immigrants. David Meade enlisted in the U.S. Navy during the War of 1812 and served as purser aboard the Susquehanna, under the command of his brother, Edward Meade. After Matthew's mother died, all the remaining Meade family ultimately moved to Brown County, Wisconsin. Matthew's eldest brother, John F. Meade, served one term in the Wisconsin State Assembly, and died under suspicious circumstances in 1850.

Both of Meade's sisters married prominent and wealthy fur traders in northern Wisconsin. His sister Catherine married the previously mentioned George Lawe. His sister Mary Elizabeth married Charles A. Grignon, who built her a mansion as a wedding present—that building is today known as the Charles A. Grignon House in the National Register of Historic Places.

Matthew Meade married Harriet Pelton at Green Bay, Wisconsin, on December 21, 1858. They had one son, John Francis Meade, but he died of tuberculosis at age 31.

Matthew Meade's former residence in Kaukauna is also listed in the National Register of Historic Places as the Capt. Matthew J. Meade House.

Wisconsin Senate
| Preceded by Frederick S. Ellis | Member of the Wisconsin Senate from the 2nd district January 1, 1866 – January 6, 1868 | Succeeded by William J. Abrams |
Political offices
| Preceded by John B. Eugene | Clerk of Brown County, Wisconsin; January 1, 1871 – January 1, 1879 | Succeeded by Patrick Ryan |
