= Thomas Shanley =

Pioneer settler

Thomas Shanley (c. 1800 – March 19, 1875) was a pioneer settler from Lancaster, Wisconsin who served as a member of the 1st Wisconsin Territorial Legislature.

== Early life ==
With his friend Henry Hodges, Shanley came to the lead mines in the Wisconsin Territory's Lead District, first to Hardscrabble in 1826, then to Beetown in 1827. They came to Cassville (where they built a log warehouse) in 1828; and in 1831 they became the first settlers in Lancaster, in what would later become Grant County, Wisconsin. On the prairie south of what would become the city of Lancaster, Hodges and Shanley built a double log cabin which served as a refuge for travelers in the region.

== Politics ==
Shanley was elected to serve in the House of Representatives (the lower house of the Wisconsin Territorial Assembly) as one of the seven members from Iowa County, which at that time was far more extensive. He served in all three sessions spanning the period from October 25, 1836 – June 25, 1838. He was a Whig.

In 1846, Shanley published a platform addressed to the voters of Grant County, stating that he had been urged to run for delegate, presumably to the Wisconsin Constitutional Convention. He was running, but was not elected. The platform has been reprinted by the State Historical Society of Wisconsin.

== Settled life ==
In January 1838, an academy was chartered in Cassville, and Shanley served as one of its trustees. In 1844, a threshing machine was built for Shanley at his place near Lancaster, apparently the first in the county; it is unclear whether "place" means farm or not. In 1849, Lancaster was organized as a town. In 1850 and 1851, Shanley served on the town's board of supervisors (equivalent to a city council).

Shanley died March 19, 1875.
