= Calvin H. Upham =

19th century American politician

C. H. Upham
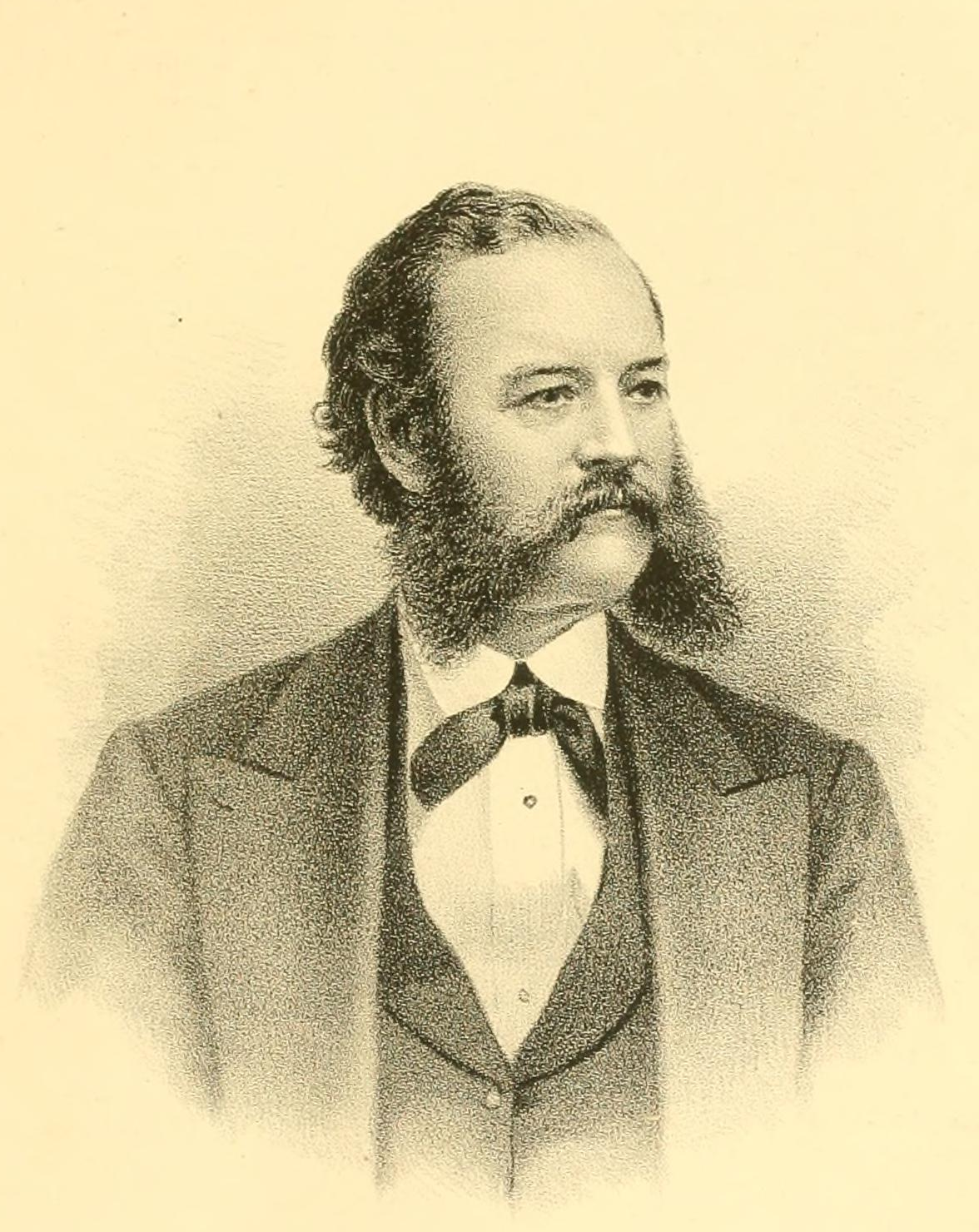
- From The History of Fond du Lac County, Wisconsin (1880)

Member of the Wisconsin State Assembly from the Racine 1st district
- In office January 6, 1862 – January 5, 1863
- Preceded by: Gilbert Knapp
- Succeeded by: Horatio T. Taylor

Personal details
- Born: February 18, 1828 Westminster, Massachusetts, U.S.
- Died: February 26, 1892 (aged 64) Ripon, Wisconsin, U.S.
- Cause of death: Stroke
- Resting place: Hillside Cemetery, Ripon, Wisconsin
- Party: Republican
- Spouse: Amanda E. Gibbs (m. 1851)
- Children: Frederic William Upham^{(b. 1861; died 1925)}; Catherine J. (Everhard)^{(b. 1864; died 1948)}; 1 other
- Relatives: William H. Upham (brother)

Military service
- Allegiance: United States
- Branch/service: United States Volunteers; Union Army
- Years of service: 1864–1865
- Rank: Captain, USV
- Unit: Department of the Gulf
- Battles/wars: American Civil War

Calvin Hoadley Upham (February 18, 1828 – February 26, 1892) was an American businessman, politician, and Wisconsin pioneer. He served one term in the Wisconsin State Assembly, representing Racine. He was a brother of William H. Upham, the 18th governor of Wisconsin. In historical documents, his name is almost always abbreviated as C. H. Upham.

== Biography ==
Calvin Upham was born in Westminster, Massachusetts, in February 1828. He ventured to the west in 1848, settling for several years at Niles, Michigan. He moved to Racine, Wisconsin, in 1853, and worked in the forwarding and commission business.

Upham became associated with the Republican Party when it was established in the 1850s. He was elected city clerk in 1859, and was re-elected in 1860. In 1861, he held both offices of city clerk and city comptroller. He was elected to the Wisconsin State Assembly in the Fall of 1861 and served in the 1862 session of the legislature. He represented Racine County's 1st Assembly district, which then comprised just the city of Racine.

After the outbreak of the American Civil War, Upham became one of the founding donors and officers of the "Racine Soldier's Relief Society", which collected charity to outfit Racine's soldiers and care for their dependents. He was later appointed an enrollment officer for the city of Racine, soliciting volunteers for service in the Union Army. Towards the end of the war, he received a federal commission as a captain in the commissary and subsistence division and assigned to the Department of the Gulf. He served just over a year, from March 1864 through June 1865.

In 1866, Upham moved north to Shawano, Wisconsin, to engage in the lumber business. While living there, he was an organizer and delegate to Wisconsin's 1868 "Soldiers' and Sailors' Convention", to select delegates to a national convention, to repudiate efforts to end Reconstruction and restore the political power of former Confederate sympathizers. He was a partner in the corporation which was formed to purchase and overhaul the Milwaukee Sentinel in 1870, under Alexander McDonald Thomson.

He moved to Ripon, Wisconsin, in 1877. He was appointed postmaster at Ripon in 1882, under President Chester A. Arthur and postmaster general Timothy O. Howe. He served until a replacement was named by President Grover Cleveland in December 1885.

He suffered a stroke in February 1892 and died at his home in Ripon.

== Personal life and family ==
Calvin H. Upham was the eldest child of Alvin Upham and his wife Sarah (née Derby). His grandfather, Jonathan Upham, was a soldier in the Continental Army during the American Revolutionary War and was present at the surrender of Yorktown. The Uphams were direct descendants of John Upham, an English colonist who came to the Massachusetts Bay Colony in 1635, and was one of the first settlers of Weymouth, Massachusetts.

Calvin had several siblings, most notable was William H. Upham, who also emigrated to Wisconsin and served in the Union Army. William Upham later became the 18th governor of Wisconsin.

Calvin Upham married Amanda E. Gibbs at Westminster, Massachusetts, in November 1851. They had at least three children, though one died young. Their son, Frederic William Upham, became a prominent businessman in Chicago.

Wisconsin State Assembly
Preceded by Gilbert Knapp	Member of the Wisconsin State Assembly from the Racine 1st district January 6, 1862 – January 5, 1863	Succeeded by Horatio T. Taylor
