= Arthur B. Ingram =

19th-century American politician

President of the Council of the Wisconsin Territory
- In office November 6, 1837 – July 4, 1838
- Preceded by: Henry S. Baird
- Succeeded by: William Bullen

Member of the Council of the Wisconsin Territory for Des Moines County
- In office October 25, 1836 – July 4, 1838 Serving with Jeremiah Smith Jr. and Joseph B. Teas
- Preceded by: District established
- Succeeded by: District abolished

Member of the Virginia House of Delegates from the Tyler County district
- In office 1826–1829
- In office 1815–1817

Personal details
- Relatives: Arthur I. Boreman (nephew)

Arthur B. Ingram, Inghram or Ingraham was a farmer, originally from Tyler County in what was then Virginia.

== Legislative service ==
Ingram (as he was then known) served five one-year terms in the Virginia House of Delegates representing Tyler County: 1815–1816, 1816–1817, 1826–1827, 1827–1828 and 1828–1829. His sister Sarah was the mother of Arthur Ingram Boreman, later first Governor of West Virginia.

== Moving on ==
He moved to Illinois, and then to the Wisconsin Territory and served in the 1st Wisconsin Territorial Assembly from 1836 to 1838 representing the southern part of what would soon become the Iowa Territory in the Territorial Council (equivalent of a state senate). He was elected President of the council for the 2nd (1837) session of the legislature, and for a subsequent special session in 1838. Iowa Territory was created July 4, 1838.

His fourth daughter and eighth child, Margaret Fee Ingraham, married W. W. Chapman.
