= Thomas MacKnight =

Thomas MacKnight may refer to:

- Thomas Macknight (1829–1899), Anglo-Irish newspaper editor, biographer and publisher
- Thomas MacKnight (minister) (1762–1836), Scottish minister, physicist, mathematician and geologist

== See also ==
- Thomas McKnight (disambiguation)
