= Peter H. Engle =

American lawyer and judge (1808–1844)

The Honorable Peter H. Engle

Judge of the Court of Common Pleas for St. Louis County
- In office February 5, 1841 – February 7, 1844
- Appointed by: Thomas Reynolds

1st Speaker of the Legislative Assembly of the Wisconsin Territory
- In office October 25, 1836 – November 6, 1837
- Preceded by: Position established
- Succeeded by: Isaac Leffler

Representative to the Legislative Assembly of the Wisconsin Territory from Dubuque County
- In office October 25, 1836 – November 26, 1838
- Preceded by: Position established
- Succeeded by: Position abolished

Personal details
- Born: Peter Hill Engle; January 10, 1808 Chester, Pennsylvania, U.S.
- Died: February 7, 1844 (aged 36) St. Louis, Missouri
- Resting place: Bellefontaine Cemetery; St. Louis, Missouri
- Party: Democratic

Military service
- Allegiance: United States
- Branch/service: Wisconsin Territorial Militia
- Years of service: 1836–1838
- Rank: Colonel

Peter Hill Engle (January 10, 1808 – February 7, 1844) was an American lawyer, judge, and Iowa pioneer. He served as the first Speaker of the Legislative Assembly of the Wisconsin Territory after it was established, when it still contained the territory of the future states of Iowa and Minnesota. He later served as a judge of the St. Louis County, Missouri, Court of Common Pleas from 1841 until his death.

== Biography ==
Engle was born in Chester, Delaware County, Pennsylvania, in 1808. He moved to Dubuque in 1836 and was one of the first lawyers in the county. This region was then part of the Michigan Territory, but was just beginning to transition to the newly designated Wisconsin Territory. An election was held to establish a territorial legislature and select a congressional delegate. In all, the Iowa District, that is, the portion of the Wisconsin Territory west of the Mississippi River, sent twelve delegates. Engle, although he had only been in the county for five months, was elected as one of Dubuque County's five representatives to the first Legislative Assembly.

=== Wisconsin Assembly ===
At the assembly, held in Belmont, then part of Iowa County, in the fall of 1836, Engle was elected as the Speaker for the 1st session of the legislature. He was also appointed Colonel of the territorial militia by Governor Henry Dodge. As a member of the Assembly, he was part of a commission which made the selection and purchase of the collection for the first library of the Wisconsin Territory, funded by a $5,000 appropriation from Congress. After the separation of Iowa from Wisconsin, the library, located in Iowa, became the property of the Iowa Territory.

Engle's Dubuque delegation had been elected on a platform of pursuing a capitol near Dubuque, on the western bank of the Mississippi River, and attempting to forestall a division of the territory. They were unsuccessful on both priorities, as the Des Moines delegation broke with them and secured a temporary capitol at Burlington, then in Des Moines County. After the failure of their initial platform, Hill was one of the delegates, to the 1837 Burlington Convention which laid out recommendations for a new Iowa Territory composed of the western half of the Wisconsin Territory. In June 1838, the Iowa Territory was officially established by Congress as a separate entity from the Wisconsin Territory.

=== 1838 Iowa congressional election ===
Just days after separation, Engle announced he would run for delegate to the 26th United States Congress on behalf of the new territory, to succeed his friend George Wallace Jones, who had been elected the representative of the Wisconsin Territory for the previous congress. Engle was aided by allies of Jones in the local press, which accused his main Democratic rival, William W. Chapman, of being unsupportive of the Democratic agenda in Washington, D.C. Letters between Jones and Wisconsin territorial governor Henry Dodge also demonstrate their personal dislike for Chapman.

There would ultimately be nine candidates in the race, but, in addition to Engle and Chapman, only two others campaigned seriously for the role—fellow-Democrat David Rorer and Whig candidate Benjamin F. Wallace. Engle had the strong support of the northern counties as he made an issue of the southern representatives' betrayal of Dubuque in the Wisconsin Assembly.

He was seen as a strong favorite to win the election that summer, but his campaign was derailed by an incident in August, when he nearly drowned in the Wapsipinicon River. His life was saved by a passing American Indian, but he was sick from the incident and unable to campaign for the final weeks before the election, held on September 10, 1838. A rumor spread that he had died from the incident and he ultimately fell 36 votes short of Chapman.

=== Missouri ===
Shortly after the election, Engle left the Iowa Territory for Missouri, settling in St. Louis. In July 1839, he is seen as one of the co-signers on a letter of support for Missouri's Democratic U.S. Senator Thomas Hart Benton. Again, in Missouri, Engle became involved in public affairs, and, in 1841, he was appointed Judge of Common Pleas for St. Louis County by Governor Thomas Reynolds. In 1843, he along with other "northern" Democrats supportive of Benton and former President Martin Van Buren started a partisan newspaper, the St. Louis Standard to advocate their politics.

Judge Engle died in St. Louis, February 7, 1844, at age 36, after an illness of several months. He was interred at Bellefontaine Cemetery in St. Louis.

== Electoral history ==
Iowa Territory's At-Large Congressional District Election, 1838
Party	Candidate	Votes	%	±%
General Election, September 10, 1838
Democratic	William W. Chapman	1,490	33.32%	
Democratic	Peter H. Engle	1,454	32.51%	
Whig	Benjamin F. Wallace	913	20.42%	
Democratic	David Rorer	605	13.53%	
Independent	Lawrence Taliaferro	3	0.07%	
Whig	William H. Wallace	3	0.07%	
Whig	Isaac Leffler	2	0.04%	
Independent	H. Craighton	1	0.02%	
Independent	John Foley	1	0.02%	
Total votes		4,472	100.0%	
Democratic win (new seat)				
