= Frank J. Bell =

American aviator

Frank Joseph Bell (June 4, 1880 – November 5, 1957) was an American aviator from Wisconsin. Bell also worked as a dentist. Bell was a member of the Early Birds of Aviation.

== Biography ==
He was born in 1880 in Potosi, Wisconsin. In 1912, Bell flew the first recorded flight into Billings Logan International Airport in Billings, Montana. He utilized a homemade Curtiss 0-x-5 airplane. In 1913, he made the longest flight to date in Montana, a record he held until 1916. He was the 198th person to gain an American pilots' license.

He married Alice A. McCormick in 1906.

He was made a fellow of the American College of Dentistry in 1939.

He died on November 5, 1957, in Billings.
