= Thomas McKnight (Wisconsin pioneer) =

American politician

Thomas McKnight was an American from Mineral Point, Wisconsin Territory who served in the 1st Wisconsin Territorial Assembly. He served in the House of Representatives (the lower house) at the same time as Thomas McKnight of Dubuque in the Iowa District was serving in the Council (the upper house).

== Background ==
McKnight came to Mineral Point before 1832.

== Public office ==
In October 1836, McKnight was elected as one of seven members of the House of Representatives from Iowa County, which would hold three sessions between October 25, 1836 and June 25, 1838. When Mineral Point was first chartered as a "borough" (as townships were then called) in 1837, McKnight was elected as its first President (equivalent to mayor).

== Forty-Niner ==
In February 1851, McKnight was among the many people listed as having left Mineral Point for California during the California Gold Rush. His name was not among those marked as having already returned, or who had died, or both.
