= Grant River =

River in Wisconsin, United States

Coordinates: 42.6633°N 90.7468°W

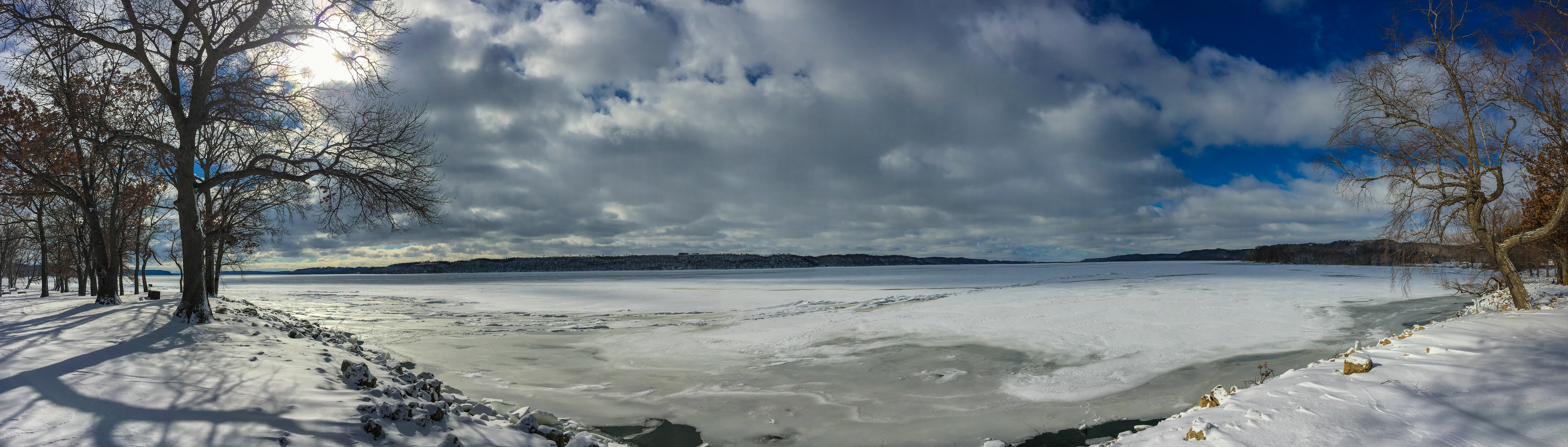
The frozen Mississippi River at Grant River Recreation Area in Potosi, Wisconsin.

The Grant River is a 44-mile-long (71 km) tributary of the upper Mississippi River in southwestern Wisconsin in the United States. It flows for its entire length in Grant County. The city of Potosi is located near its mouth. Tributaries include Boice Creek, Rattlesnake Creek, Pigeon Creek, Blake Fork, Little Grant River, Borah Creek, and Rogers Branch. As part of the Driftless Area of Wisconsin, the river has a substantial valley.

The Army Corps of Engineers maintains the Grant River Recreation Area at the river's mouth. Camping, fishing and boating are the main attractions.

The river was named for an early trapper who lived on the river bank.

== See also ==
- List of Wisconsin rivers

== Sources ==
- Grant River Recreation Area
- Wisconsin Dept. of Natural Resources - Grant and Platte Basins
- U.S. Geological Survey Geographic Names Information System: Grant River
