= Potosi Badger Huts Site =

- U.S. National Register of Historic Places
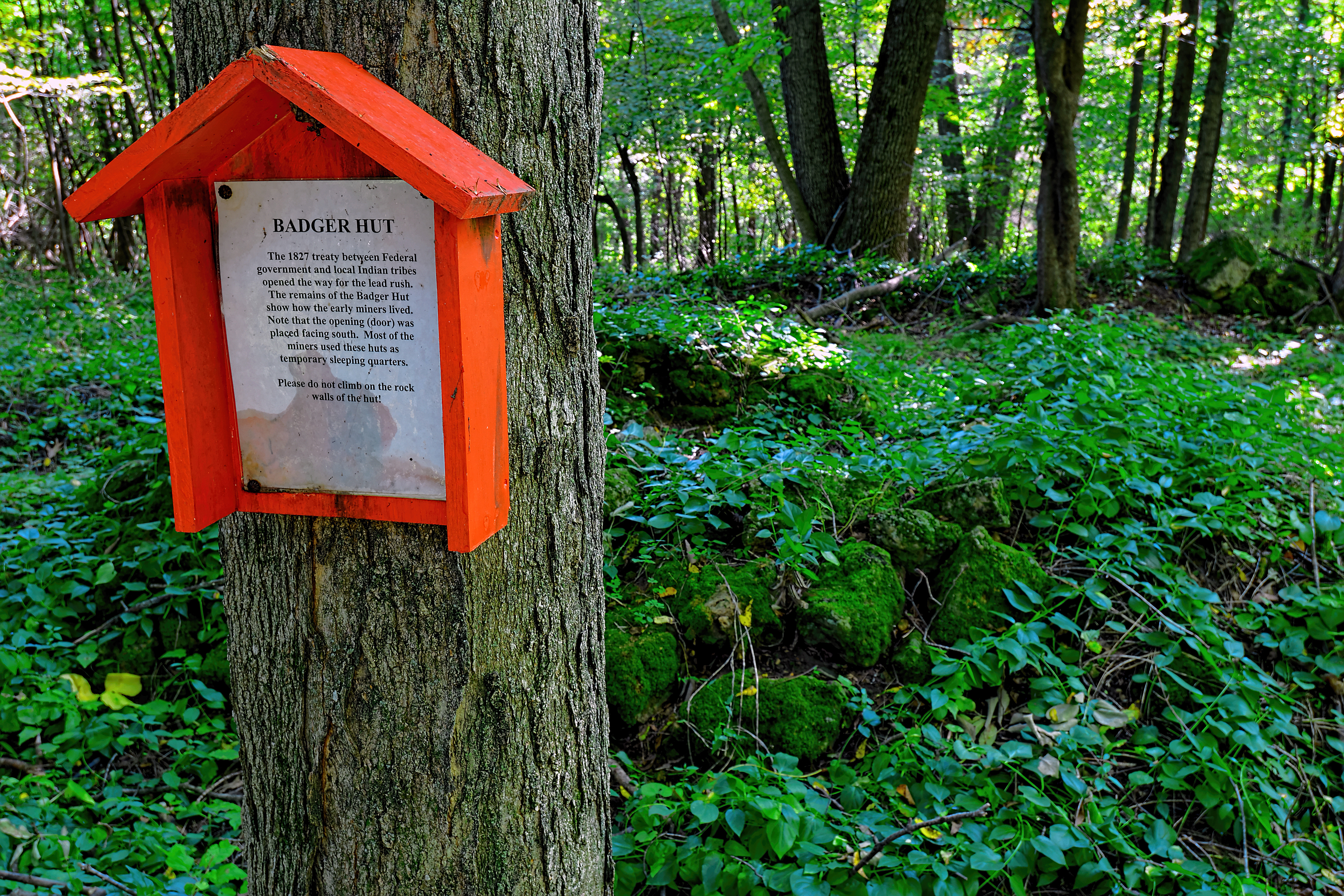
- A portion of the site.
- Location: Potosi, Wisconsin
- Coordinates: 42°41′10″N 90°42′45″W
- Area: 9.8 acres (4.0 ha)
- NRHP reference No.: 96001532
- Added to NRHP: December 27, 1996

The Potosi Badger Huts Site is located in Potosi, Wisconsin. It was listed on the National Register of Historic Places in 1996. It was listed for its potential to yield information in the future.

It is an archeological site which includes the remnants of two structures, plus 100 "diggings", shafts, and a possible adit. The site derives "from the early 1830s and was probably abandoned by the late 1840s, when the initial lead boom ended. Covering approximately 10 acres, the site is located on the top and sides of a southwest to northeast bearing ridge that overlooks the village of Potosi."

== History ==
The National Register of Historic Places states that "Although no artifacts have yet been recovered to assign these structures to the early lead mining era, the appearance of the rock walls suggest some antiquity. The stones are moss-covered and the spaces between the stones have filled with dirt. Long-term Potosi residents also regard them as the remains of early miners' (a.k.a. badgers) huts. The evidence, admittedly, remains circumstantial."
