= Gilbert Knapp =

Founder of Racine, Wisconsin

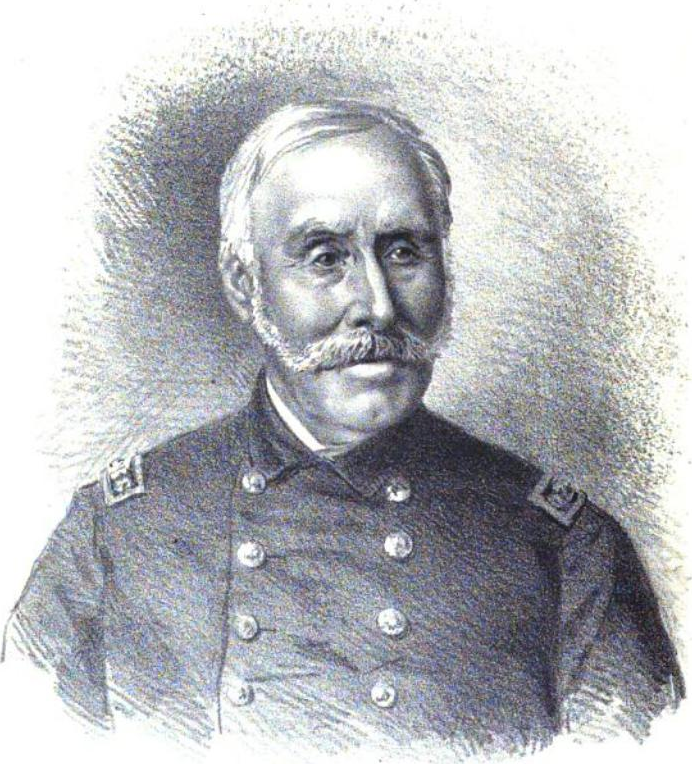

Member of the Wisconsin State Assembly from the Racine 1st district
- In office January 7, 1861 – January 6, 1862
- Preceded by: William P. Lyon
- Succeeded by: Calvin H. Upham

Member of the Council of the Wisconsin Territory from Milwaukee County
- In office October 25, 1836 – November 26, 1838 Serving with Alanson Sweet
- Preceded by: Position Established
- Succeeded by: Daniel Wells, Jr. William A. Prentiss

Personal details
- Born: December 3, 1798 Chatham, Massachusetts, U.S.
- Died: July 31, 1887 (aged 88) Racine, Wisconsin, U.S.
- Resting place: Mound Cemetery, Racine
- Party: Republican; Democratic (before 1855); Whig (before 1835)
- Spouses: Maria Annan; (m. 1821; died 1828); Hannah H. Annan; (m. 1831; died 1832); Almira Meach; (m. 1837; died 1876)
- Children: with Maria Annan; Robert Annan Knapp^{(b. 1822; died 1876)}; Mary Annan (McClurg)^{(b. 1826; died 1888)}; Gilbert Knapp^{(b. 1827; died 1900)}; at least 1 other
- Parents: John Elnathan Knapp (father); Sarah (Smith) Knapp (mother)
- Occupation: sailor, land speculator
- Known for: Founder of Racine, Wisconsin

Military service
- Allegiance: United States
- Branch/service: U.S. Revenue Cutter Service
- Years of service: 1818–1828; 1861–1874
- Rank: Captain
- Commands: USRC Alexander J. Dallas; USRC Wm. P. Fessenden
- Battles/wars: War of 1812; American Civil War

Gilbert G. Knapp (December 3, 1798 – July 31, 1887) was an American sailor and land speculator. He was the founder of Racine, Wisconsin, and was instrumental in establishing the city and county of Racine. For many years before and after the establishment of Racine, he was a captain in the United States Revenue Cutter Service, commanding several ships in the Great Lakes.

== Early life ==
Knapp was born on December 3, 1798, in Chatham, Massachusetts. His father, John Knapp, was a soldier in the American Revolutionary War, and, after the war, captained a merchant ship and engaged in trade to European ports. As a young man, Gilbert Knapp studied the science of navigation, and, at age 13, joined the crew Captain Childs, his uncle by marriage, sailing to Canada and Spain.

== War of 1812 and Cutter Service ==
At the outbreak of the War of 1812, he joined the crew of the Leo, a privateer commanded by Captain Besonne, under contract to the United States to run dispatches to France. Their mission involved running the British blockade of French ports and avoiding capture from British men-of-war. They ultimately made three successful voyages, surviving several engagements with British navy and privateers.

During the war, he became acquainted with several officers who had served under Commodore Oliver Hazard Perry at the Battle of Lake Erie, and was convinced that he should turn his interests to the navigation and geography of the Great Lakes. In 1818, he joined the United States Revenue Cutter Service and sailed the great lakes, studying its harbors and tributary rivers. In 1819, he was commissioned a captain, and given command of the USRC Alexander J. Dallas, stationed at Detroit for about eight months. He was then assigned to Mackinac Island, at the strait connecting Lake Huron to Lake Michigan, where he broke up an extensive fur smuggling ring. In the later part of his service, he was assigned to Erie, Pennsylvania.

During one of his many cruises on Lake Michigan, Captain Knapp went ashore at the mouth of the Root River to explore the region. The Root River was then known as "Chippecotton", which is the Potawatomi word for "Root". He determined that this would be a good place for a settlement and harbor and resolved to return.

== Settling Port Gilbert ==
Knapp was vocally opposed to the candidacy of Andrew Jackson in the 1828 United States presidential election, telling a crowd of people in Erie, "I consider General Jackson a cut-throat and a murderer, and his wife a strumpet, and if he should be elected I never will hold an appointment under him." Jackson won the presidency, and Knapp was dismissed from the Revenue Cutter Service.

Knapp moved to Chautauqua County, New York, and worked as a merchant marine. The 1833 Treaty of Chicago, signed after the Black Hawk War, opened up the possibility for settlement on the west coast of Lake Michigan. Thus, in 1834, Captain Knapp set out to return to the Root River site. The treaty did not come into force until 1835, thus the land still belonged to the Potawatomi, but Knapp determined to settle the area before some other claim could be established.

He sold his New York property and traveled to Chicago, where he obtained the investment of Gurdon Saltonstall Hubbard, an early settler in that area. Hubbard helped him find an Indian guide, who brought him to the trading post at "Skunk Grove" (now Franksville, Wisconsin), where he found a guide to take him east to the Lake shore. He camped in the area for two days, scouting the shore and river, and confirmed his earlier beliefs that the site would be appropriate for a settlement. He returned to Chicago with his report.

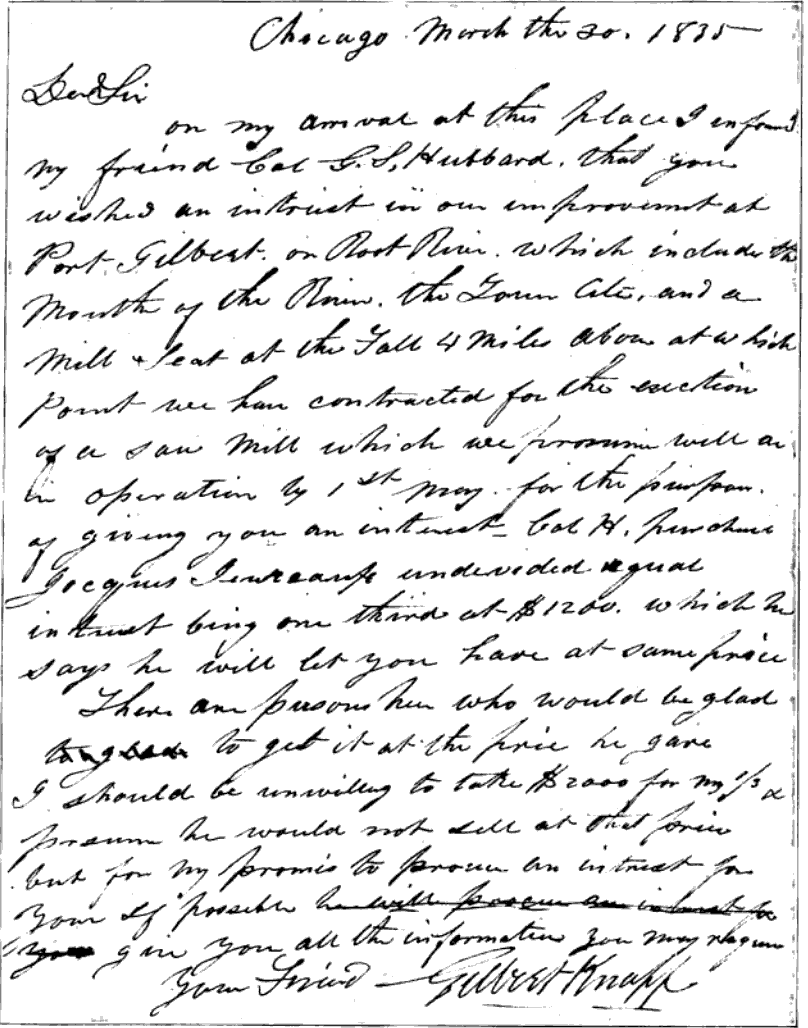
Knapp's March 30, 1835, letter to Barker, offering him a one third stake in their venture

In November 1834, he returned to the river with three men and constructed a cabin with material carried from Chicago. This was the first settlement at what is now Racine, Wisconsin. He left two of his men, William and A. J. Luce, as his agents on the land while he returned to Chicago and the east that winter. In Buffalo, New York, he sought out an old acquaintance, Jacob A. Barker, who had expressed an interest in the venture. Barker purchased a one-third stake in the venture for $1,200 (about $35,000 adjusted for inflation to 2020), formally offered in a March 30, 1835, letter. Thus Knapp, Hubbard, and Barker became equal financial partners in a claim of 140.98 acres on either side of the mouth of the Root River. On the claim, they established the Town of "Port Gilbert"—named in honor of Knapp—the first colonial settlement in southeastern Wisconsin. The name was later changed to "Racine", the French word for "root".

Later in 1835, Knapp brought his children from New York, and his sister, Sarah Milligan, became the first woman to join the town, bringing her three daughters as well. Within a year, there were 100 settlers in Racine County. By 1840, the population of Racine and Kenosha County (which were then the same county) was 3,475.

== Wisconsin Territory ==
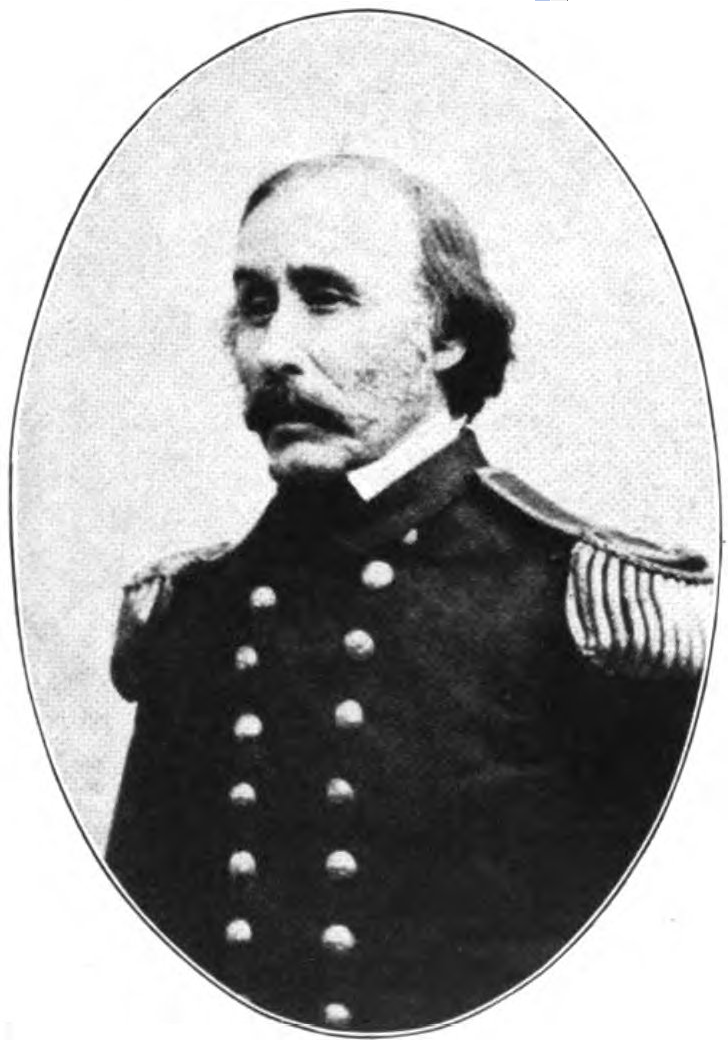
Captain Knapp

At the time of the settlement at Port Gilbert, all of the present state of Wisconsin was part of the Michigan Territory. In 1835, when the state of Michigan was organized, Knapp was selected as one of the representatives of the remainder territory to serve in the 7th Michigan Territorial Council. On July 3, 1836, the Wisconsin Territory was organized from that remainder.

The first election in the Wisconsin Territory was to be held October 10, 1836. For political purposes, Racine fell under Milwaukee County at this time, and Milwaukee County was entitled to two council members. A convention was held at Rochester which nominated Knapp as Racine's candidate for one of those seats. His chief opponent was William See, of Rapids. Knapp easily won the seat, alongside Milwaukee resident, Alanson Sweet. Knapp's victory was loudly celebrated in Racine.

He served in the first three sessions of the Wisconsin territorial legislature. And his service in the legislature produced the new Racine County from the southeastern section of Milwaukee County. On January 2, 1838, the first three towns of Racine County—Racine, Mount Pleasant, and Rochester—were officially established by an act of the territorial legislature.

In 1838, Knapp gave financial backing to the creation of the Racine Argus, the first newspaper in the county. During this time, Knapp was engaged in extensive legal struggles over his claims. Settlers had rushed into the area after the 1835 settlement of the Treaty of Chicago, and several had taken up tracts of land already claimed by Knapp. His claims were eventually upheld, in 1842, when the county seat was established at Racine.

In 1848, Knapp was one of the incorporators of the Rock River Plank Road, which connected Racine to Janesville, Wisconsin.

== Later years ==
Knapp was elected to one term in the Wisconsin State Assembly, serving in the 14th Wisconsin Legislature as a Republican.

Knapp returned to the Revenue Cutter Service and served before and after the Civil War. Near his retirement, he commanded the USRC William P. Fessenden. He retired in 1874 and spent the remainder of his life in Racine.

== Family ==
In 1821, during his time in the Cutter Service in Michigan, he married Maria Annan, his first wife. They had four children together before her death in 1828. In 1831, he married Hannah Annan, the sister of his first wife, but she died only a year later. In 1837, he married his third and final wife, Almira Meach. They were married forty years until her death in 1876.

== Death and legacy ==
After the death of his third wife, Knapp lived the last decade of his life at the home of his daughter, Mary Annan McClurg, at the present site of the Racine Legacy Museum and Veterans Center, at 820 Main Street. He died there on July 31, 1887.

His funeral was held August 3, 1887. All flags in the city and on ships in the harbor were flown at half mast. Honorary pallbearers included United States Senator James Rood Doolittle and Case Corporation founder J. I. Case.

He was buried at Racine's historic Mound Cemetery. His grave was unmarked until 1944, when the Veterans of Foreign Wars donated a marker.

He is memorialized by the Captain Gilbert Knapp Monument at 1751 Michigan Boulevard in Racine. The Gilbert Knapp Elementary School, at 2701 17th Street, is named for him, and contains a plaque memorializing him.

== See also ==
- A Comprehensive Biography of Gilbert Knapp, the Founder of Racine, by Francis J. Reich

Wisconsin State Assembly
Preceded by William P. Lyon	Member of the Wisconsin State Assembly from the Racine 1st district January 7, 1861 – January 6, 1862	Succeeded by Calvin H. Upham
