= Potosi, Wisconsin =

- Village
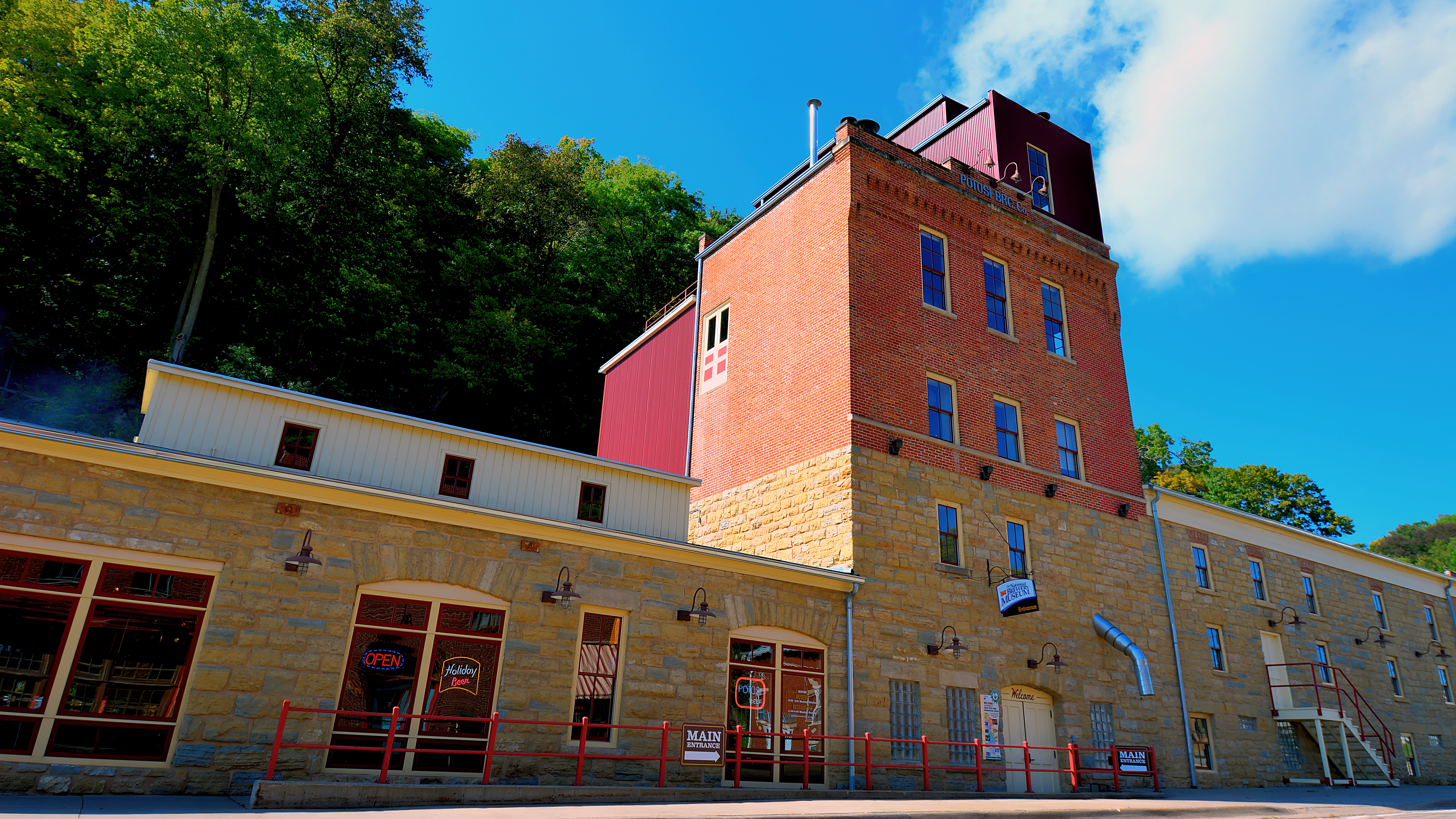
- Potosi Brewery

- Location of Potosi in Grant County, Wisconsin.
- Coordinates: 42°41′22″N 90°42′44″W
- Country: United States
- State: Wisconsin
- County: Grant

Area
  - Total: 1.68 sq mi (4.34 km^{2})
  - Land: 1.66 sq mi (4.30 km^{2})
  - Water: 0.019 sq mi (0.05 km^{2})
- Elevation: 814 ft (248 m)

Population (2020)
  - Total: 646
  - Density: 389/sq mi (150/km^{2})
- Time zone: UTC-6 (Central (CST))
  - Summer (DST): UTC-5 (CDT)
- Area code: 608
- FIPS code: 55-64650
- GNIS feature ID: 1583964

Potosi is a village in Grant County, Wisconsin, United States. The population was 646 at the 2020 census. The village is in the Town of Potosi.

== History ==
Potosi is located where Wisconsin's lead ore belt intersects with the Mississippi. Three villages – Head of the Hollow, Van Buren, and Lafayette – formed in the 1830s. In 1839, James P. Cox platted a city called Osceola on the river bank southeast of Lafayette, but no lots were sold. The three villages were merged on February 19, 1841, to form Potosi. Possible origins for the town's name include the Spanish word for lead, a corruption of the Native American name of a settler's wife, and Potosi, Missouri, where some early miners originated (itself named for the fabled silver mines of Potosí, Bolivia).

== Geography ==
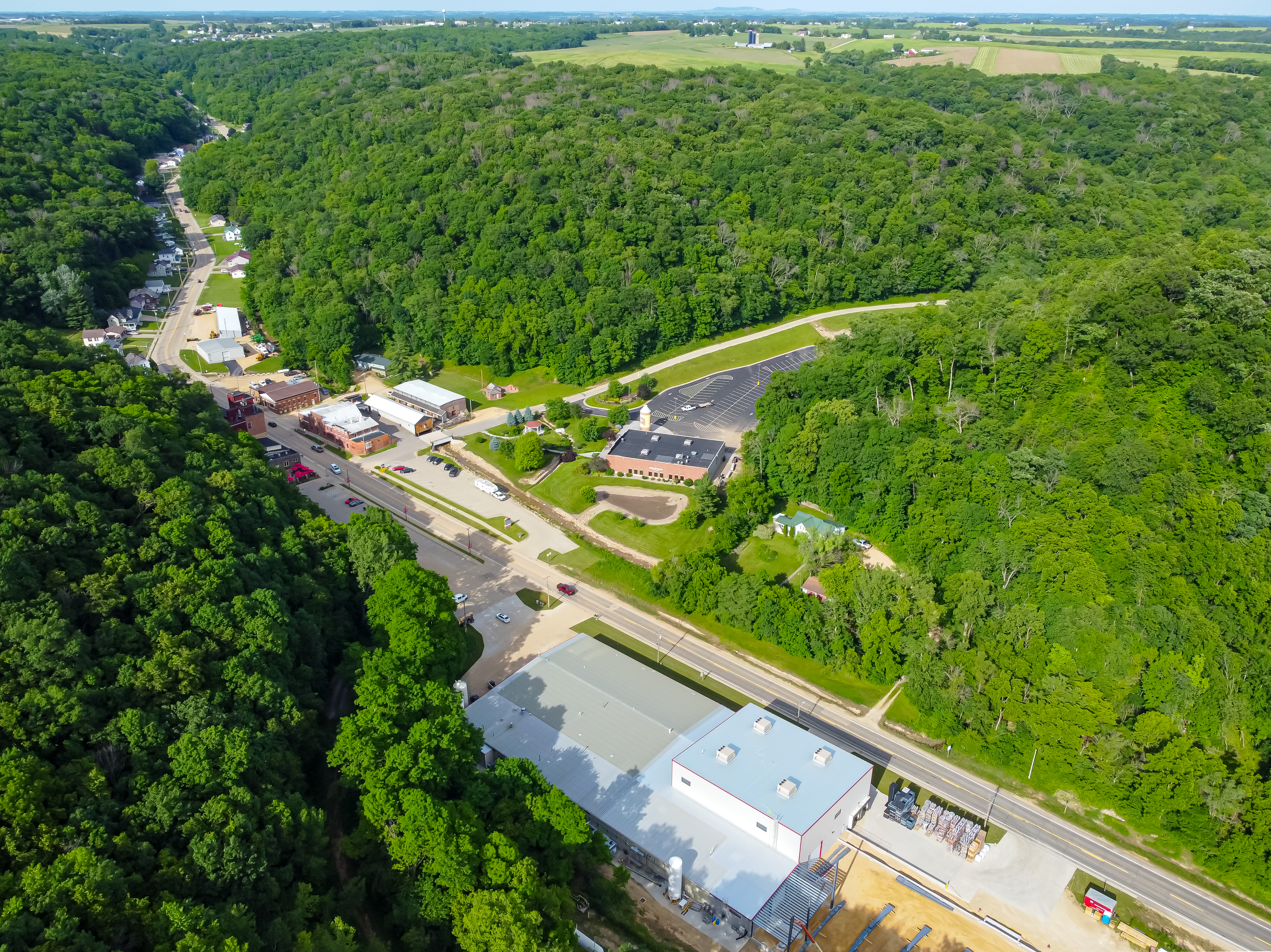
Wisconsin Highway 133 runs through town

According to the United States Census Bureau, the village has a total area of 1.67 square miles (4.33 km^{2}), of which 1.65 square miles (4.27 km^{2}) is land and 0.02 square miles (0.05 km^{2}) is water.

== Demographics ==
Historical population
Census	Pop.	Note	%±
1880	466		—
1900	434		—
1910	464		6.9%
1920	501		8.0%
1930	447		−10.8%
1940	506		13.2%
1950	556		9.9%
1960	589		5.9%
1970	713		21.1%
1980	736		3.2%
1990	654		−11.1%
2000	711		8.7%
2010	688		−3.2%
2020	646		−6.1%
U.S. Decennial Census

=== 2010 census ===
As of the census of 2010, there were 688 people, 295 households, and 203 families living in the village. The population density was 417.0 inhabitants per square mile (161.0/km^{2}). There were 322 housing units at an average density of 195.2 per square mile (75.4/km^{2}). The racial makeup of the village was 98.7% White, 0.1% Native American, 0.7% Asian, 0.1% from other races, and 0.3% from two or more races. Hispanic or Latino of any race were 0.6% of the population.

There were 295 households, of which 26.8% had children under the age of 18 living with them, 55.3% were married couples living together, 10.5% had a female householder with no husband present, 3.1% had a male householder with no wife present, and 31.2% were non-families. 27.1% of all households were made up of individuals, and 12.5% had someone living alone who was 65 years of age or older. The average household size was 2.33 and the average family size was 2.79.

The median age in the village was 45.3 years. 21.4% of residents were under the age of 18; 8.6% were between the ages of 18 and 24; 19.6% were from 25 to 44; 30.9% were from 45 to 64; and 19.5% were 65 years of age or older. The gender makeup of the village was 48.5% male and 51.5% female.

=== 2000 census ===
As of the census of 2000, there were 711 people, 302 households, and 199 families living in the village. The population density was 432.1 people per square mile (166.4/km^{2}). There were 320 housing units at an average density of 194.5 per square mile (74.9/km^{2}). The racial makeup of the village was 99.02% White, and 0.98% from two or more races. 0.98% of the population were Hispanic or Latino of any race.

There were 302 households, out of which 29.5% had children under the age of 18 living with them, 57.0% were married couples living together, 6.0% had a female householder with no husband present, and 34.1% were non-families. 30.8% of all households were made up of individuals, and 18.2% had someone living alone who was 65 years of age or older. The average household size was 2.35 and the average family size was 2.96.

In the village, the population was spread out, with 24.1% under the age of 18, 8.3% from 18 to 24, 26.6% from 25 to 44, 23.2% from 45 to 64, and 17.9% who were 65 years of age or older. The median age was 38 years. For every 100 females, there were 98.1 males. For every 100 females age 18 and over, there were 97.1 males.

The median income for a household in the village was $35,294, and the median income for a family was $47,955. Males had a median income of $28,478 versus $25,982 for females. The per capita income for the village was $17,189. About 4.9% of families and 7.3% of the population were below the poverty line, including 6.1% of those under age 18 and 11.5% of those age 65 or over.

== Arts and culture ==
Potosi is the home of the Potosi Brewing Company. The Potosi Brewery in the village operated from 1852 to 1972, and reopened in 2008 following a restoration project which converted the facility into a museum and brew pub. In 2015, the business opened a new production facility in Potosi.

Known as the "Catfish Capital of Wisconsin," the village holds an annual Catfish Festival and Fireman's Fish Fry, typically on the second weekend of August. The event includes a truck and tractor pull, beanbag and a euchre tournament, fireworks, live music, a parade, and the fish fry. The National Brewery Museum and Library opened in the village on the site of the Potosi Brewery in 2008. The museum features historic beer and brewing memorabilia, including signs, advertisements, bottles, cans, and miscellaneous paraphernalia.

Local road signs herald Potosi's Main Street as "the longest Main Street in the world." A newspaper article traces the claim to a 1950s item in Ripley's Believe It Or Not! which made the more qualified statement that it is the longest Main Street without a cross street. Current maps show a three-mile stretch, with numerous streets—including one named "Cross Street"—that drain into it and end, forming T-shaped intersections, but no street that continues across it. The stretch is divided into two portions each with a distinct street name: North Main Street and South Main Street.

The Potosi Badger Huts Site, remnants of the region's lead mining history, are listed on the National Register of Historic Places and accessible by trail.

== Notable people ==
- Frank J. Bell, aviator and dentist
- William Biddlecome, lawyer
- Joshua B. Bradbury, farmer, teacher, and legislator
- Lafayette Caskey, carpenter and legislator
- Edward John Dorn, United States Naval Governor of Guam
- John Lewis Dyer, Methodist circuit rider, who carried gospel to Colorado in 1860s and 1870s; mined lead near Potosi in 1840s
- Melvin Grigsby, Union Army and Spanish–American War veteran who served as South Dakota Attorney General
- William Hull - lawyer and legislator
- Keith Krepfle, football player
- William Josiah MacDonald, U.S. Representative from Michigan
- James Wilson Seaton, lawyer and legislator
- Fred A. Thomas, Montana State Representative
