= William B. Sheldon =

American lawyer and pioneer (1805–1847)

Speaker of the Legislative Assembly of the Wisconsin Territory
- In office June 11, 1838 – November 26, 1838
- Preceded by: Isaac Leffler
- Succeeded by: John W. Blackstone

Representative to the Legislative Assembly of the Wisconsin Territory from Milwaukee County
- In office October 25, 1836 – November 26, 1838
- Preceded by: Position established

Personal details
- Born: William Billings Sheldon; 1805 Red Hook, New York, U.S.
- Died: October 20, 1847 (aged 41–42) Buffalo, New York
- Cause of death: Asthma
- Resting place: Oak Hill Cemetery; Janesville, Wisconsin
- Party: Democratic
- Spouses: Anna Bonesteel; (m. 1820; died 1845)
- Children: Maria (Gardner) (Wright) (Scammon) (1821–1901); Cornelia (Woodle) (1824–1867); Frances Elizabeth Ogden (1831–1900)

William Billings Sheldon (1805 – October 20, 1847) was an American lawyer and Wisconsin pioneer. He was an early settler of Janesville, Wisconsin, and served in the Legislature of the Wisconsin Territory. He was Speaker of the Assembly during the Special Session of the 1st Legislature.

== Biography ==
Born in Red Hook, Dutchess County, New York. He married Ann Bonesteel, of Woodstock, New York, and they lived for a time in Delhi, New York, where their children were born. Sheldon was associated with the New York Militia and rose to Brigadier General for the 25th Infantry Brigade, 6th Division, in 1836.

In 1836, Sheldon moved west with his family, settling in Milwaukee, Wisconsin Territory. There, he was elected as one Milwaukee's representatives to the 1st Legislative Assembly of the Wisconsin Territory. He served in all three sessions of the 1st Assembly, and was chosen as Speaker for the Special session in the summer of 1838. In 1839, Sheldon moved his family to Janesville, in Rock County, where he was one of the first settlers. That year, he was appointed Justice of the Peace for Rock County by Governor Henry Dodge, and remained in that office until 1842. He was also appointed, in 1840, a commissioner to locate suitable land for a university in the Milwaukee region. And, in 1842, he was listed as Commissary General of the Wisconsin Militia.

After the death of his wife, in 1845, Sheldon appears to have donated his property in Janesville to create the Janesville Female Seminary. He died at the Western Hotel in Buffalo, New York, on October 20, 1847.

== Personal life and family ==
Sheldon married his wife, Anna Bonesteel, around 1820. They had at least three children. Their eldest daughter, Maria, was the second wife of Chicago lawyer and abolitionist Jonathan Young Scammon.

He and his wife were active with the Episcopal Church in Milwaukee and helped to establish an Episcopal Church in Janesville, in 1844.
