= John Lawe =

American judge

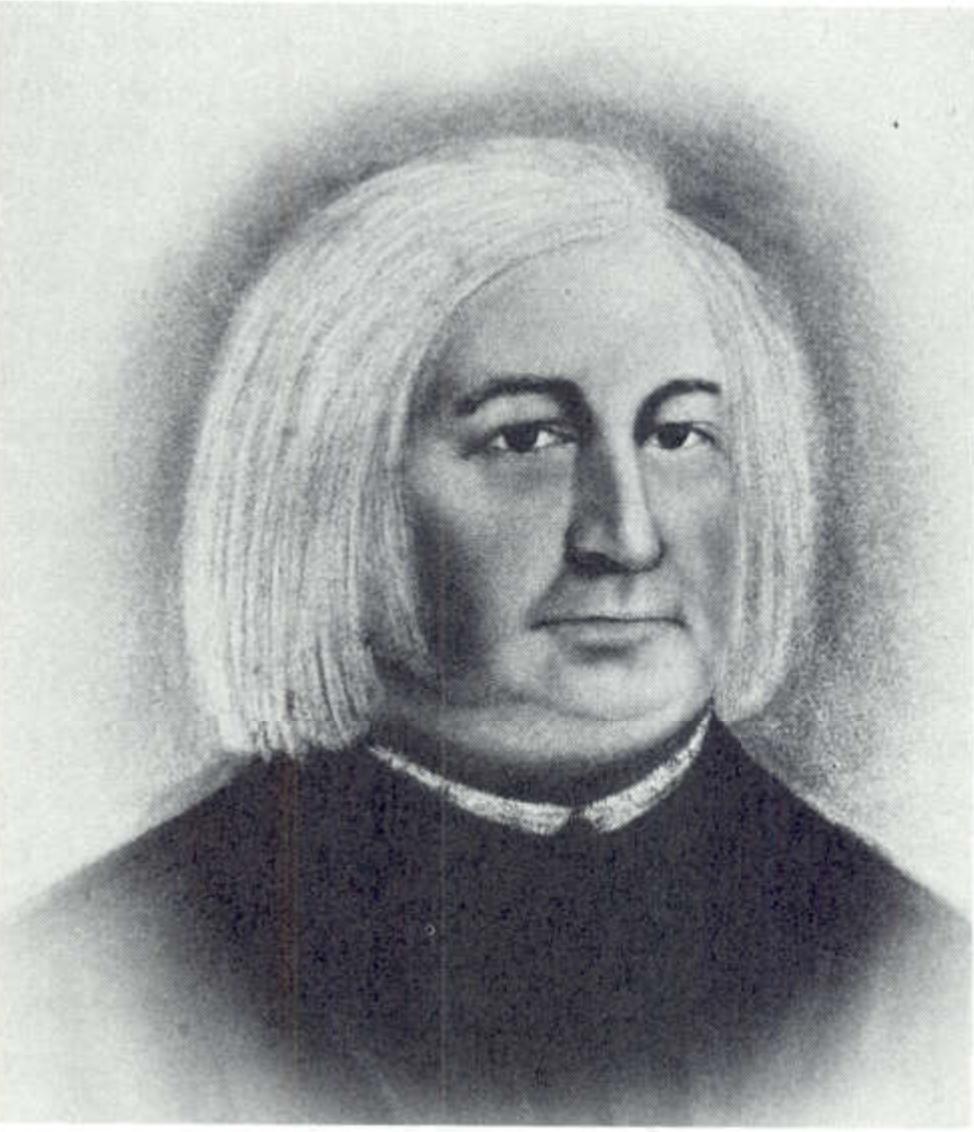
John Lawe (1779 - 1846) of Green Bay, Wisconsin Territory

John Lawe (December 6, 1779 - February 11, 1846) was a pioneer fur trader, merchant, land speculator, sawmill owner and judge in Green Bay, Wisconsin Territory. He served in the brief "Rump Council" which may be regarded as the first legislature of what was to become Wisconsin.

== Background ==
Although the family history is fragmentary and contradictory, Lawe seems to have been born December 6, 1779, in Montreal, son of Captain William Lawe (a native of York) and Rachel or Midd Franks, a member of the prominent Jewish Franks family of Quebec and British North America. (David Salisbury Franks was John's great-uncle.) His father died a few years later, and he and his mother joined her brother Jacob Franks, a fur trade clerk in Montreal. Young Lawe became a classmate of Jean Joseph Rolette. In 1790, Lawe's mother went to the East Indies to join another of her brothers, and neither John nor Jacob ever learned what happened to her.

In 1792, Franks' employer sent him to run their trading post in Green Bay. In 1796, Lawe went to work for his uncle on Mackinac Island, and the next year both of them moved to Green Bay permanently; Franks set up his own business, and Lawe clerked for him. For years, Lawe would be sent out to serve as his uncle's agent, wintering at various posts along the Mississippi, Fox and Wisconsin rivers.

=== Work with James Aird ===
In 1805, Franks, Robert Dickson and other traders formed a trading partnership, allocating territories and pooling profits or losses. Lawe went to work for another of the partners, James Aird, whose assigned territory was the Missouri River Valley. In the fall of 1805, Aird led an expedition to spend three years exploring upriver as far as the region later to be known as The Dakotas. This included four flatboats of trade goods, voyageurs and Aird's clerks. In addition to Lawe, these clerks included young Ramsay Crooks. The two became friends on the trip from Green Bay to St. Louis.

When the party came to St. Louis, it was discovered that U.S. president James Madison had recently forbidden British subjects to trade in the Louisiana Purchase. Aird and Crooks were able to come to accommodation with the American authorities, but the emphatically anti-American Lawe was refused, as a British citizen, permission to trade, and returned to Green Bay the next spring, angry and embittered. In 1810, Lawe would encounter Crooks at Mackinac Island, who was part of the Astor Expedition on their way to the Columbia River country. It was only with great difficulty that he was dissuaded from joining the expedition, and as consolation he was made a full partner.

=== Marriage ===
In 1808, Lawe married Thérèse Rankin Grignon (Neckickoqua or "Otter Woman"), daughter of a British trader and Weauwining, a daughter of chief Ashauwbemy of the Lac du Flambeau Ojibwa; and adopted her two children by her prior marriage. They would stay married until Thérèse's death in 1836, and would have eight more children together.

== War of 1812 ==
Pro-British traders like Franks and Lawe evaded the Embargo and Non-Intercourse Acts, smuggling goods from Montreal into Green Bay and beyond. With the outbreak of the War of 1812, this became more difficult, and the customers dependent on them began to suffer. Despite the shortness of supply, Lawe spent 1812-13 trading somewhere on the Trempealeau River, and came down with something he called "common sickness". As a result, Lawe (by then a lieutenant in the British Indian Department) was unable to join his fellows from Green Bay in the British attack on Detroit. His uncle, who had gone back to Montreal (taking most of their money with him) insisted that Lawe return to Green Bay to trade. He traded, collected money from tenants in his various land holdings, and worked on supplying the Indian Department and the British garrison at Mackinac Island. His commander wrote, toward the end of the war, "Lawe has shown great zeal, in the service of Government during the winter, and is worthy of being promoted, and appointed to conduct the duties of his department at this place. He is, indeed one of the few belonging to the department who are of any service." Lawe and Franks quarreled bitterly over money, and were never reconciled before Franks' 1841 death.

== Postwar ==
Unlike some of his old partners who left for places like the Red River Colony after the end of the war, Lawe remained in Green Bay (now under increasingly firm American control, especially after the construction of Fort Howard). Policies were unabashedly favorable towards new "Yankee" traders out of the U.S. over the established Green Bay traders like Lawe who were regarded as foreign nationals. And the biggest of these was the arrival of John Jacob Astors American Fur Company (for whom Lawe's old friend Ramsey Crooks was now working), intent on control of the fur trade across the United States.

In 1821, Lawe and some partners organized the Green Bay Company, an "outfit" (as they were called) with an exclusive agreement to trade with and for the AFC; this and similar arrangements would continue for the next two decades. Lawe's assigned territory was the watersheds of the Green Bay and the Wolf River. But the old-style traders chafed under the restrictions imposed by the arrangement with AFC (they'd been accustomed to seek trade wherever they would), and Lawe found himself in a bitter rivalry with old classmate Jean Joseph Rolette, head of the Western Outfit based in Prairie du Chien, who eventually succeeded in restricting the old Green Bay traders to a narrow compass (with tacit support from the company, which was not happy with the "indolence" of the casual, easygoing style they represented, as opposed to the AFC policy of strict economy, deadlines and budgets).

Lawe himself maintained an excellent reputation with those around him, being known for shrewd trading, integrity and generosity towards all manner of neighbors. Entire tribes were said to insist on taking their furs solely to Lawe, and his home in Green Bay maintained a tradition of hospitality, including serving as a smallpox vaccination venue for neighbors. By 1828, federal confirmation of title to lands whose claims he had bought from Franks and other traders made him the largest property owner of the lower Fox River (even though the AFC sometimes managed to foreclose on him to collect particular debts). Almost everybody in the growing area had borrowed money from him, and he donated to local institutions and occasionally paid delinquent taxes for neighbors.

== Public affairs ==
In 1831, Lawe, despite his lack of legal training, was appointed associate justice for Brown County, Michigan Territory, and would retain the sobriquet of "Judge Lawe" from then on. He was elected in 1835 to the so-called "Rump Council", the 7th and last Territorial Council of Michigan, which actually only represented the portions of the old Michigan Territory which were not about to become the new state of Michigan. While he attended the brief session (unlike four of his thirteen colleagues), he mostly voted in the majority, and made no remarks which made it into the council's records (although he did get his son George designated "Assistant Messenger" for the Council).

== Changes in the business ==
Increasingly, Lawe would be able to collect his trading debts from the various tribes by levy upon the many annuities payable annually in return for land cessions and peace treaties to which they had agreed. Again, Lawe and his allies felt that Rolette always got favorable treatment. Lawe even made one trip himself to Washington, D.C., in 1837, seeking to collect on claims against the Winnebago tribe. It was his first venture outside the frontier in thirty years. He was described as physically imposing, weighing over 300 pounds, but felt shabby in the face of all the "luxury and superfluity... in great abundance" and became homesick, gratefully returning to Green Bay (without collecting). In addition to land speculation in that portion of Green Bay which American Fur had not seized from him in foreclosure in 1824, Lawe speculated in land in Milwaukee and Two Rivers, Wisconsin, and owned a sawmill in the latter town.

== Death and deathbed ==
Lawe suffered a heart attack in late 1845 from which he never fully recovered, and died February 11, 1846. Lawe, who was of Jewish background, was baptised a Protestant, and had served as vestryman and treasurer of Wisconsin's first Episcopalian church, was reported to have made a deathbed conversion to Catholicism, and was buried in a Catholic cemetery next to Thérèse. Local speculation was that the purpose of his conversion was to allow this burial.
