= Alanson Sweet =

American politician

Alanson Sweet (March 12, 1804 – April 18, 1891) was an American pioneer, businessman and politician.

Born in Owasco, New York, in 1831, he settled on a farm in Naperville, Illinois. He served in a militia company in 1832 during the Black Hawk War. In 1833, he moved to Chicago, Illinois and helped incorporate the city. He then served on the Cook County Board of Commissioners. In 1835, Sweet moved to Milwaukee, Michigan Territory where he claimed some land and became a farmer and grain dealer. Sweet served on the Wisconsin Territorial Council of the Wisconsin Territorial Legislature, from 1836 to 1838, as a Democrat. He supported moving the Wisconsin territorial capital to Madison, Wisconsin. He also served on the Milwaukee Common Council from 1848 to 1849. Later he moved to Kansas, where he bought a farm near Arkansas City, Kansas, and then moved to Evanston, Illinois, where he died.
