= Iowa District =

- District of the United States and Wisconsin Territory
- 1834–1838
- History
  - Established: 1834
  - Disestablished: 1838
- Subdivisions
  - Type: Counties
  - Units: Dubuque County and Demoine County
- Today part of: United States

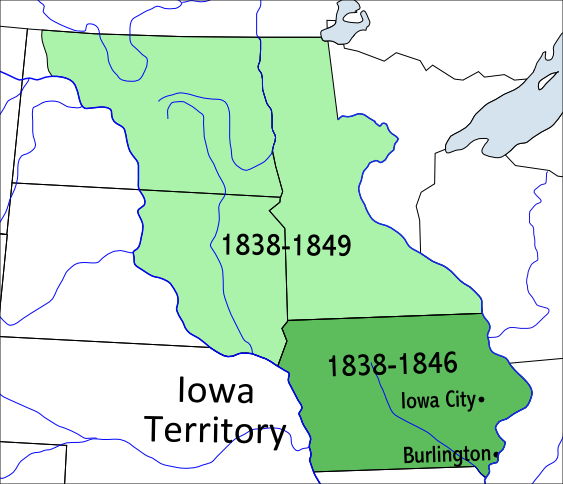

The Iowa District was a region of north-central North America west of the Mississippi River claimed by the United States. From June 28, 1834, to July 4, 1838, it was part of the Michigan Territory and, later, the Wisconsin Territory. It included not only the area which became the state of Iowa, but parts of what would become Minnesota, North Dakota and South Dakota. In September 1834, at an extra session of the Sixth Legislative Assembly of Michigan, the Iowa District was divided into two counties. A border was drawn due west from the lower end of Rock Island in the Mississippi River. The territory north of this line (which started just south of the present-day Davenport) was named Dubuque County, and all area to the south of the line was named Des Moines County.

The Wisconsin Territory was trimmed back on July 4, 1838, and the entirety of the Iowa District became the new Iowa Territory.
