= 1826 Kentucky's 12th congressional district special election =

A special election was held in Kentucky's 12th congressional district on November 20, 1826, to fill a vacancy caused by the death of Robert P. Henry (J) on August 25, 1826

== Election results ==
Candidate	Party	Votes	Percent
John F. Henry	Anti-Jacksonian	2,208	50.7%
Chittenden Lyon	Jacksonian	2,149	49.3%

Henry took office on December 11, 1826. With his victory, the 12th district changed from Jacksonian control to Anti-Jacksonian control, increasing the Anti-Jacksonian membership by one.

== See also ==
- List of special elections to the United States House of Representatives
