= James Clarke (Iowa politician) =

American politician (1812–1850)

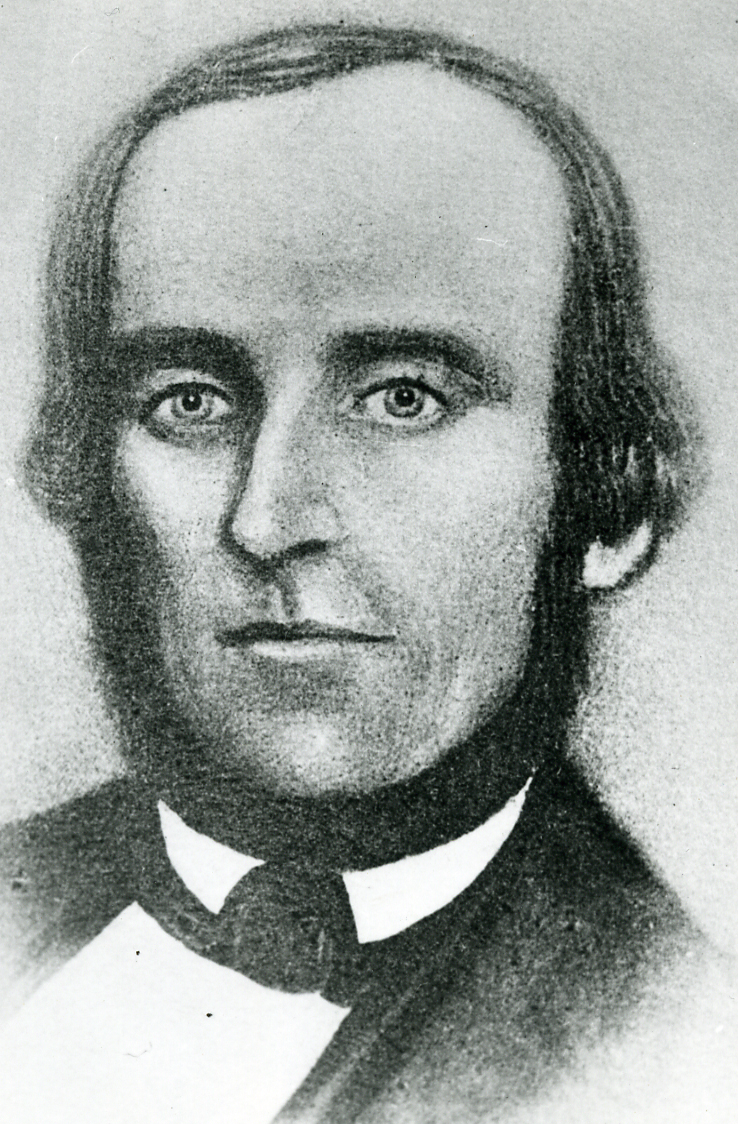
- James Clarke, from an oil painting

3rd Governor of Iowa Territory
- In office November 18, 1845 – December 3, 1846
- Appointed by: James K. Polk
- Preceded by: John Chambers
- Succeeded by: Ansel Briggs

2nd Iowa Territory Secretary
- In office 1839–1844
- Appointed by: Martin Van Buren
- Preceded by: William B. Conway
- Succeeded by: O. H. W. Stull

Mayor of Burlington, Iowa
- In office 1844–1845

Personal details
- Born: July 5, 1812 Greensburg, Pennsylvania, U.S.
- Died: July 28, 1850 (aged 38) Burlington, Iowa, U.S.
- Resting place: Aspen Grove Cemetery; Burlington, Iowa, U.S.
- Party: Anti-Jacksonian, Whig
- Spouse: Christiana Helen Dodge
- Relations: Henry Dodge (father-in-law); Augustus C. Dodge (brother-in-law)
- Children: 5

James Clarke (July 5, 1812 – July 28, 1850) was the third governor of Iowa Territory from November 18, 1845 until December 3, 1846, being appointed to the office, as a Democrat, by President James Polk.

== Early life ==
He was born in Greensburg, Pennsylvania. Clarke was a printer by trade when in 1836 he moved to Belmont, the new capital of the Wisconsin Territory. He married Christiana Dodge, the daughter of territorial governor Henry Dodge, and became territorial librarian.When the territorial capital moved from Belmont to Burlington (now Iowa) Clarke and his family followed, and he founded the Wisconsin Territorial Gazette and Burlington Advertiser, a newspaper, on July 10, 1837.

== Political career ==
When the Iowa Territory was established, President Van Buren appointed Clarke "Secretary in and for the Territory of Iowa," as shown in two of the donated documents, dated November 27, 1839, and February 19, 1840.

By 1842, the territorial capital had moved from Burlington to Iowa City, where Clarke assisted Governor Lucas with government and political business. Some people opposed Clarke's appointment because of his close personal ties to the Dodge family, but as the mayor of Burlington and editor of the Burlington Gazette, Clarke had gained a reputation as one of the leading advocates for statehood.

President Polk appointed Clarke governor of the Iowa Territory on November 8, 1845. Iowa's statehood was still a year away when Clarke was appointed the third governor of the Iowa Territory in 1845. Clarke already was well known in political circles since he had been territorial secretary to Iowa's first territorial governor, Robert Lucas.

Clarke played a pivotal role in the development of Iowa, helping to define the state's boundaries and forming the first constitutional conventions. Only four weeks after Clarke delivered his last official message as governor in December 1846, Iowa became the 29th state to join the union.

He was mayor of Burlington, Iowa, from 1844-1845.

Clarke resumed his work as a newspaper editor in Burlington. He became the first president of the Burlington School Board and remained active in local political affairs until tragedy struck in July 1850.

== Personal life and legacy ==
He married Christiana Dodge, daughter of Wisconsin governor Henry Dodge and sister of senator and ambassador Augustus C. Dodge.

His wife and infant son, James, succumbed to a cholera epidemic that swept through Burlington and other Mississippi River towns. Just two weeks later, Clarke, just 38, also died of cholera. The Clarkes are buried in Aspen Grove Cemetery, Burlington.

Clarke County, Iowa was named after James Clarke.

He died in Burlington.

Political offices
Preceded by John Chambers	Territorial Governor of Iowa; November 18, 1845 – December 3, 1846	Succeeded by Ansel Briggs; Governor
