= Governor Conway =

Governor Conway may refer to:

- Elias Nelson Conway (1812–1892), 5th Governor of Arkansas
- Henry Seymour Conway (1721–1795), Governor of Jersey from 1772 to 1795
- James Sevier Conway (1798–1855), 1st Governor of Arkansas
- Thomas Conway (1735–1800), Governor of French colonies in India from 1787 to 1789
- William B. Conway (1802–1839), Acting Governor of Iowa Territory
