= The Strongest (1920 film) =

1920 film by Raoul Walsh

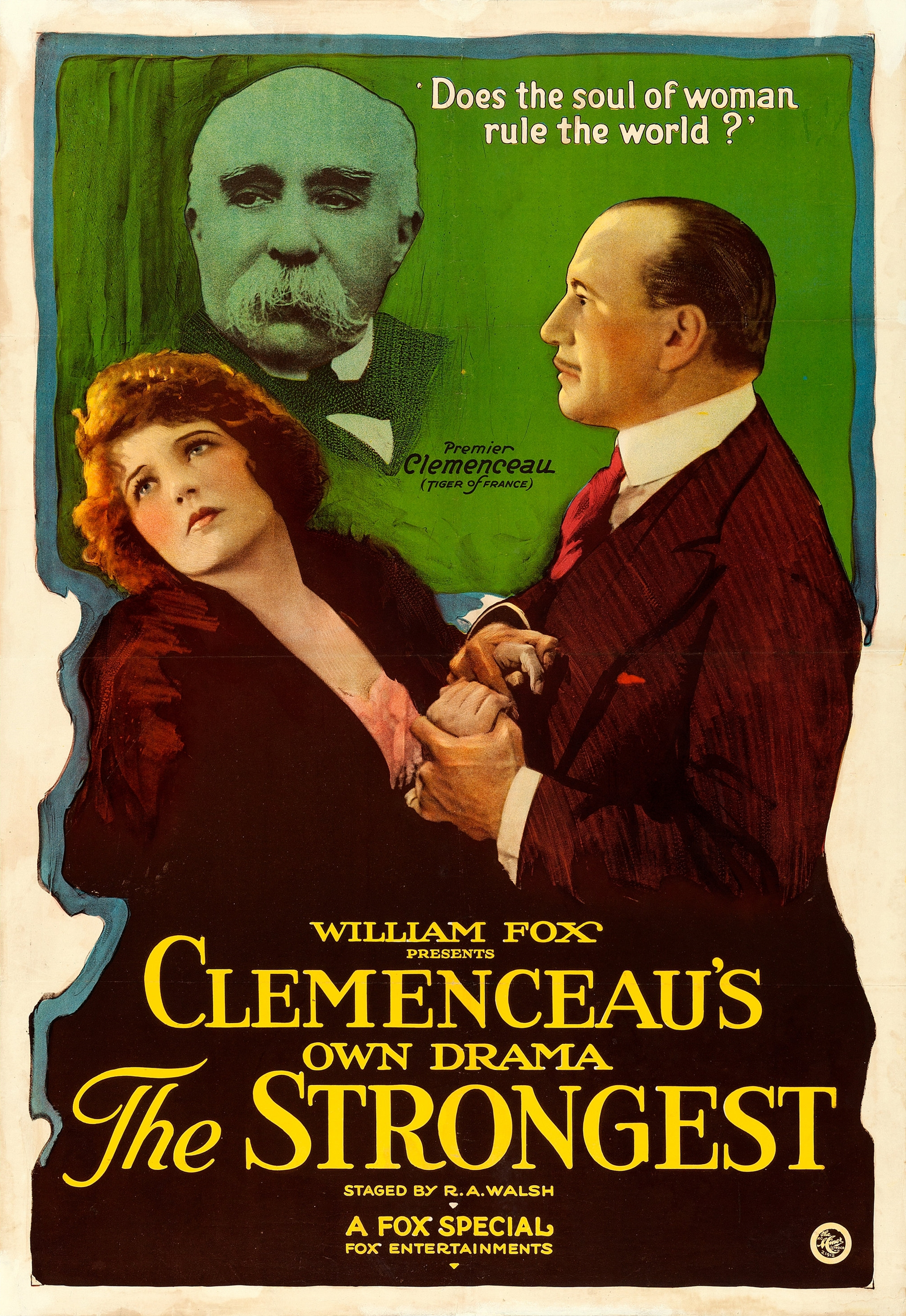
- Theatrical release poster
- Directed by: Raoul Walsh
- Written by: Raoul Walsh (scenario)
- Based on: Les Plus Fort by Georges Clemenceau
- Starring: Renée Adorée; Carlo Liten; Harrison Hunter; Beatrice Noyes; Florence Malone; Jean Gauthier DeTrigny
- Cinematography: Ben Bail
- Production company: Fox Film Corporation
- Distributed by: Fox Film Corporation
- Release date: February 1920
- Running time: 6 reels
- Country: United States
- Language: Silent (English intertitles)

The Strongest is a 1920 American silent drama film directed by Raoul Walsh and starring Renée Adorée, Carlo Liten, Harrison Hunter, Beatrice Noyes, Florence Malone, and Jean Gauthier DeTrigny. It is based on the 1919 French novel Les Plus Fort by Georges Clemenceau. The film was released by Fox Film Corporation in February 1920.

== Cast ==
- Renée Adorée as Claudia
- Carlo Liten as Henri
- Harrison Hunter as Harle
- Beatrice Noyes as Betty Macklin
- Florence Malone as Claire Harle
- Jean Gauthier DeTrigny as Visconte
- Madame Tressida as Nanette
- Jean Gauthier as Visconte
- Georgette Gauthier DeTrigny as Comtesse
- Hal Horne as Maurice
- James A. Marcus as Curate
- C.A. de Lima as Prefect of Police
- Teddy Piper

== Production and Context ==
The Strongest is an adaptation of the 1919 social novel Le Plus Fort written by Georges Clemenceau, who served as the Prime Minister of France during World War I. The film was produced in the post-war era by the Société Industrielle des Cinématographes..

Directed by Léon Pougny and Louis Gallet, the production translated Clemenceau's French society. The film's release coincided with Clemenceau's retirement from active political office in January 1920..

== Preservation ==
The film is now considered lost.
