= Kentucky's 12th congressional district =

Coordinates: 38°15′N 84°15′W

- Obsolete district
- Created: 1820
- Eliminated: 1840
- Years active: 1823–1843

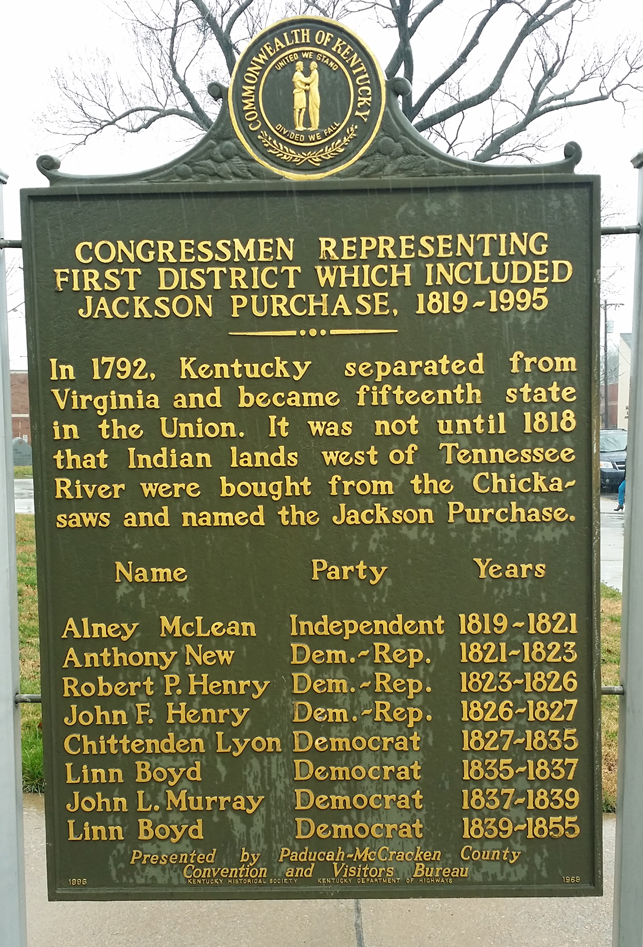
Sign in front of the McCracken, Kentucky Courthouse (in Paducah, Kentucky) commemorating early members of the U.S. House of Representatives representing Jackson Purchase (U.S. historical region). The "First District" in the title actually changed over time. It refers to the Jackson Purchase, which was in the 5th district from 1819 to 1823, the 12th district until 1833, and then the 1st district until the end of the sign's lineage in 1855.

Kentucky's 12th congressional district was a district of the United States House of Representatives in Kentucky. It was lost to redistricting in 1843. Its last representative was Garrett Davis.

== List of members representing the district ==
Member	Party	Years	Cong ress	Electoral history	Location
District created March 4, 1823
Robert P. Henry (Hopkinsville)	Democratic-Republican	March 4, 1823 – March 3, 1825	18th 19th	Elected in 1822. Re-elected in 1824. Died.	1823–1833; Caldwell, Christian, Hickman, Hopkins, Livingston, Todd, Trigg, and Union counties
Robert P. Henry (Hopkinsville)	Jacksonian	March 4, 1825 – August 25, 1826	18th 19th	Elected in 1822. Re-elected in 1824. Died.	1823–1833; Caldwell, Christian, Hickman, Hopkins, Livingston, Todd, Trigg, and Union counties
Vacant		August 25, 1826 – December 11, 1826	19th		1823–1833; Caldwell, Christian, Hickman, Hopkins, Livingston, Todd, Trigg, and Union counties
John F. Henry (Hopkinsville)	Anti-Jacksonian	December 11, 1826 – March 3, 1827	19th	Elected November 20, 1826 to finish Robert Henry's term and seated December 11, 1826. Lost re-election.	1823–1833; Caldwell, Christian, Hickman, Hopkins, Livingston, Todd, Trigg, and Union counties
Chittenden Lyon (Eddyville)	Jacksonian	March 4, 1827 – March 3, 1833	20th 21st 22nd	Elected in 1827. Re-elected in 1829. Re-elected in 1831. Redistricted to the 1st district.	1823–1833; Caldwell, Christian, Hickman, Hopkins, Livingston, Todd, Trigg, and Union counties
Thomas A. Marshall (Paris)	Anti-Jacksonian	March 4, 1833 – March 3, 1835	23rd	Redistricted from the 2nd district and re-elected in 1833. Lost re-election.	1833–1843 [data missing]
John Chambers (Washington)	Anti-Jacksonian	March 4, 1835 – March 3, 1837	24th 25th	Elected in 1835. Re-elected in 1837. Retired.	1833–1843 [data missing]
John Chambers (Washington)	Whig	March 4, 1837 – March 3, 1839	24th 25th	Elected in 1835. Re-elected in 1837. Retired.	1833–1843 [data missing]
Garrett Davis (Paris)	Whig	March 4, 1839 – March 3, 1843	26th 27th	Elected in 1839. Re-elected in 1841. Redistricted to the 8th district.	1833–1843 [data missing]
District eliminated March 3, 1843
