= Iowa Territory =

Territory of the U.S. between 1838–1846

Coordinates: 45°N 96°W

- Organized incorporated territory of the United States
- 1838–1846
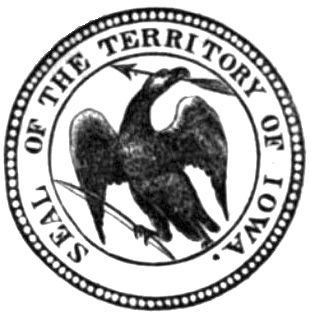
- Territorial seal

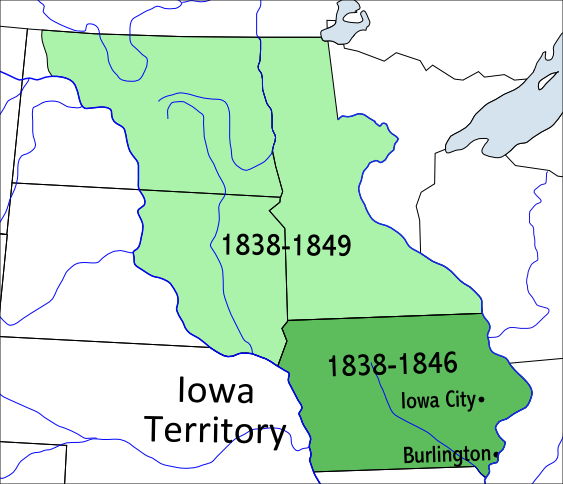
- The territory that did not become the state of Iowa in 1846 became unorganized territory. The government for this area would become organized as part of the Minnesota Territory in 1849.
- Capital: Burlington (1838–1841); Iowa City (1841–1849)
- Government
  - Type: Organized incorporated territory
- Governor
  - 1838–1841: Robert Lucas
  - 1841–1845: John Chambers
  - 1845–1849: James Clarke
- Legislature: Iowa Legislative Assembly
- History
  - Organized from Wisconsin Territory: 3 July 1838
  - Statehood of Iowa: 28 December 1846
Preceded by	Succeeded by
Wisconsin Territory	Iowa

Iowa Territory was an organized incorporated territory of the United States that existed from July 3, 1838, until December 28, 1846, when the southeastern portion of the territory was admitted to the Union as the state of Iowa. The remainder of the territory would have no organized territorial government until the Minnesota Territory was organized on March 3, 1849.

== History ==
Multiple Native American groups occupied Iowa Territory before the Louisiana purchase in 1803, including the Sac, Fox, Winnebagoes, Pottawattamies, Otoes, Omahas, Sioux, Ioways and Dakotas.

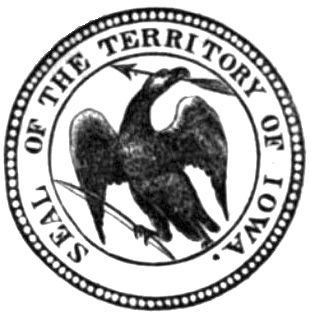
Seal of the Territory of Iowa

Most of the area in the territory was originally part of the Louisiana Purchase and was a part of the Missouri Territory. When Missouri became a state in 1821, this area (along with the Dakotas) effectively became unorganized territory. The area was closed to white settlers until the 1830s, after the Black Hawk War ended. It was attached to the Michigan Territory on June 28, 1834. At an extra session of the Sixth Legislative Assembly of Michigan held in September, 1834, the Iowa District was divided into two counties by running a line due west from the lower end of Rock Island in the Mississippi River. The territory north of this line (which started just south of the present-day Davenport) was named Dubuque County, and all south of it was Des Moines County. When Michigan became a state in 1836 the area became the Iowa District of western Wisconsin Territory—the region west of the Mississippi River.

The original boundaries of the territory, as established in 1838, included Minnesota and parts of the Dakotas, covering about 194,000 square miles (500,000 km^{2}) of land.

Burlington was the provisional capital; Iowa City was designated as the official territorial capital in 1841. Fort Snelling was located on the western side of the Mississippi placing it within the Territory until statehood.

When Iowa became a state on December 28, 1846, no provision was made for official organization of the remainder of the territory. Morgan L. Martin, the Wisconsin territorial delegate to congress, pushed through a bill to organize a territory of Minnesota which would encompass this land. While the bill passed in the House, it did not pass the Senate. In the following session a bill by Stephen A. Douglas was introduced in the Senate but also did not pass. The situation was resolved when Minnesota Territory was organized on March 3, 1849, the day before the close of congress.

In the 1840 United States census, 18 counties in the Iowa Territory reported the following population counts:

Rank	County	Population
1	Van Buren	6,146
2	Lee	6,093
3	Des Moines	5,577
4	Henry	3,772
5	Dubuque	3,059
6	Jefferson	2,773
7	Muscatine	1,942
8	Louisa	1,927
9	Washington	1,594
10	Johnson	1,491
11	Jackson	1,411
12	Linn	1,373
13	Cedar	1,253
14	Scott	1,240
15	Clayton	1,101
16	Clinton	821
17	Jones	471
18	Delaware	168
	Unincorporated	900
	Iowa Territory	43,112

== Governance ==
Spanish and French monarchs had claims of jurisdiction over the region, but neither country set up permanent governance in the Iowa area. In 1804, Iowa was part of Indiana Territory, then in 1805 was part of Louisiana Territory, with St. Louis as the capitol. In 1812, Iowa became part of Missouri Territory, and in 1821 was left without a governance after Missouri became a state. In 1834, Iowa became part of Michigan Territory, with the capitol being Detroit. In 1836, Iowa became part of Wisconsin Territory, and later became Iowa Territory in 1838, eventually becoming a state in 1846.

The executive powers of the Territory were vested in a Governor, a Secretary (who in case of the death, removal, resignation, or absence from the Territory of the Governor had gubernatorial powers and would perform gubernatorial duties), a Treasurer and an Auditor.

=== Territorial officers and congressional delegates ===
Territorial officers of Iowa Territory from 1838 to 1846.
Year	Governors	Secretaries	Territorial Auditors	Territorial Treasurers	Territorial Agents	District Attorneys
1838	Robert Lucas	William B. Conway	none	none	none	Isaac Van Allen
1839	Robert Lucas	James Clarke	none	Thornton Bayless	Chauncey Swan	Isaac Van Allen
1840	Robert Lucas	James Clarke	Jesse Williams	Morgan Reno	Chauncey Swan	Charles Weston
1841	John Chambers	O. H. W. Stull	Jesse Williams	Morgan Reno	Jesse Williams	Charles Weston
1842	John Chambers	O. H. W. Stull	Jesse Williams	Morgan Reno	John N. Colman	Charles Weston
1843	John Chambers	Samuel J. Burr	William L. Gilbert	Morgan Reno	John N. Colman	Hohn G. Deshler
1844	John Chambers	Samuel J. Burr	William L. Gilbert	Morgan Reno	Anson Hart	Hohn G. Deshler
1845	James Clarke	Jesse Williams	Robert M. Secrest	Morgan Reno	Anson Hart	Edward Johnston
1846	James Clarke	Jesse Williams	Robert M. Secrest	Morgan Reno	Anson Hart	Edward Johnston

=== Legislature ===
Legislative powers were vested in a Territory of Iowa Legislative Assembly, which like that of Wisconsin Territory was divided into an upper house called the "Council" (although some legislative histories refer to the Council as the Senate) of 13 members, and a House of Representatives of 26.

== See also ==
- Historic regions of the United States
- History of Iowa
- Territorial evolution of the United States
