= Florence Malone =

American actress (1891–1956)

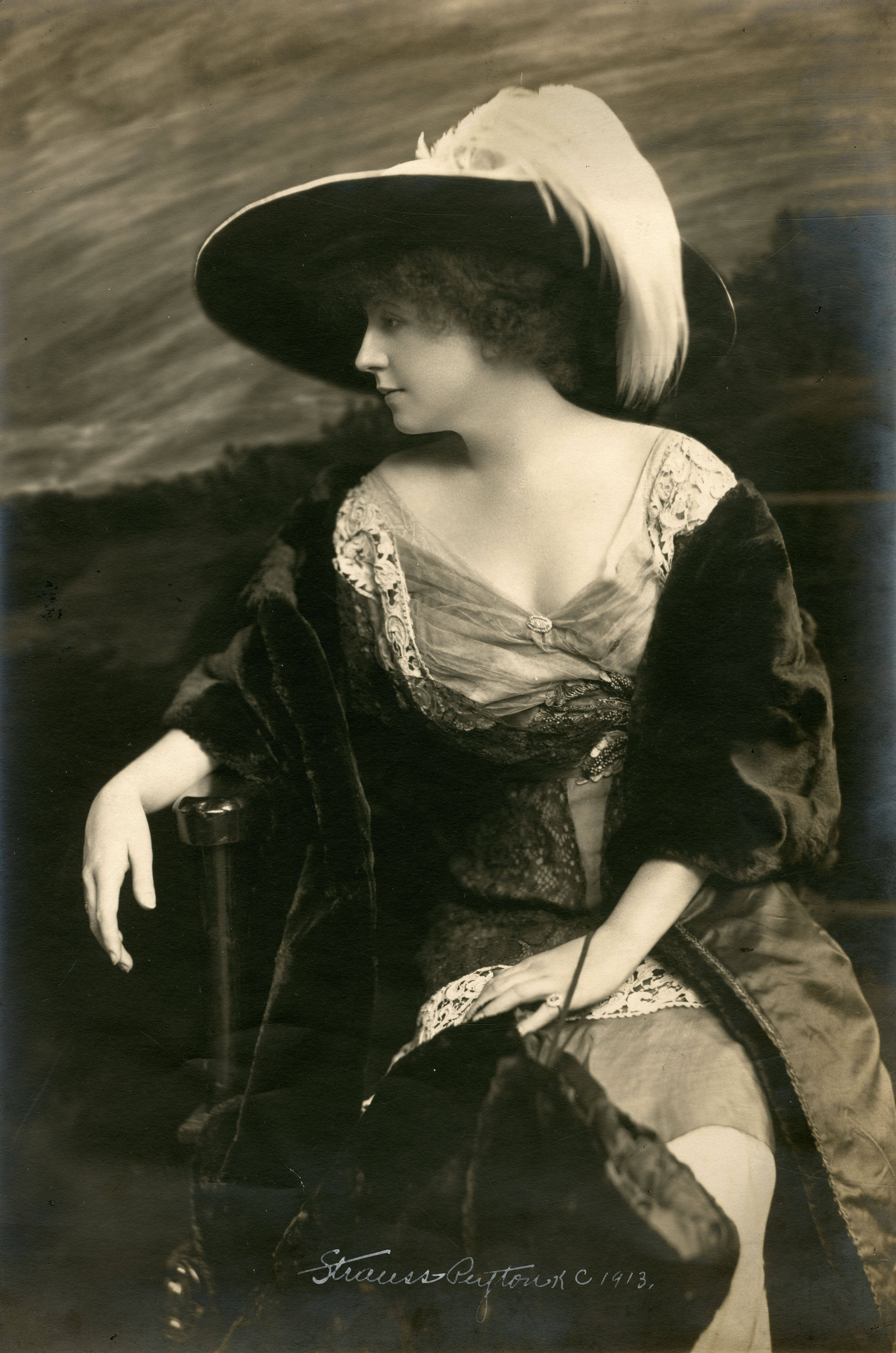
Florence Malone in 1913

Florence Malone (October 8, 1891 – March 4, 1956) was an American stage and film actress active during the Silent film era. Malone acted in several plays between 1907 and 1920, many of them on Broadway, and in six films produced between 1915 and 1920. After her stage career, Malone worked on radio programs.

== Career ==
Born in the borough of Brooklyn, New York City, Malone initially wanted to be a painter; however, after accompanying a friend to an audition as a singer with Andrew Mack's theater company, a theatrical agent took an interest in Malone. At 16, Malone got the opportunity to work in the play The Minister's Daughter. She later traveled to San Francisco, where she worked with Mrs. Leslie Carter in Vasta Herne in 1910. James Forbes also took an interest in her, giving her a role in The Commuters (1912). On Broadway, Malone was part of the cast of plays such as Respect for Riches (1920, as Muriel) and The Masquerader (1917, as Lady Lillian Astrupp).

As a film actress, Malone debuted in The Master Hand (1915), a film produced by Premo Feature Film Corporation. In 1916, she appeared in the serial The Yellow Menace, also produced by Serial Film Corporation. Her last film was The Strongest, released in 1920.

An accident that occurred around 1925-1926 scarred her face, forcing Malone to give up acting. She later worked for NBC radio programs.

Florence Malone died in Lyons, New York, in 1956.

== Filmography ==
- The Master Hand (1915)
- The Suburban (1915)
- The Yellow Menace (1916)
- The Sea Waif (1918)
- The Battler (1919)
- The Strongest (1920)

== Plays ==
- The Minister’s Daughter (1907)
- Vasta Herne (1910)
- The Commuters (1912)
- The Talkers (1912)
- The Silver Wedding (1913)
- Under Cover (1915)
- The Masquerader (1917)
- Respect for Riches (1920)
- The Ladder (?)
