= The American Manufacturer =

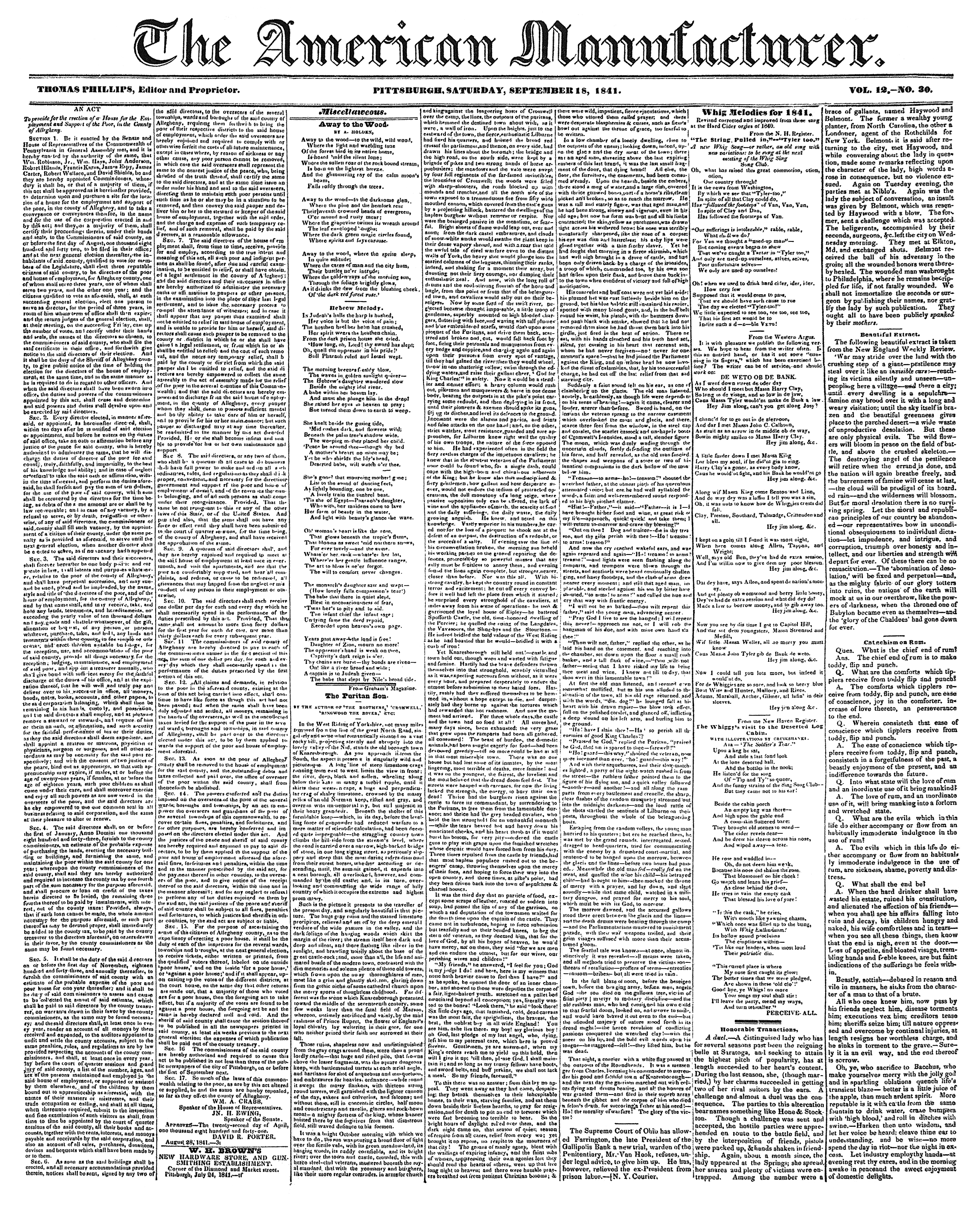
- Front page, 18 September 1841
- Type: Weekly newspaper (1830–1842); daily newspaper (1837–1838)
- Founder: William B. Conway
- Founded: 6 March 1830
- Ceased publication: 3 September 1842
- Political alignment: Democratic
- Language: English
- City: Pittsburgh, Pennsylvania
- Country: United States

The American Manufacturer was a newspaper published in Pittsburgh, Pennsylvania, United States, on a mostly weekly basis from 1830 until 1842. The paper supported Jacksonian Democratic politics and was known for its radical and provocative content. Its successor by merger was the Pittsburgh Post, which by further consolidation became the Pittsburgh Post-Gazette.

== Inception ==
In February, 1830, William B. Conway issued a prospectus for a new weekly newspaper to be called The American Manufacturer. He announced that the first issue would appear on March 6 of the same year, and set the subscription price at $2 per annum. Conway promised that "American Manufactures, Agriculture, and Internal Improvement, will find in him an unwavering advocate."

== Conway and R. Phillips years ==
Upon founding the Manufacturer, or at least not long thereafter, Conway associated himself with Richard Phillips in the conduct of the paper.

From the start, the paper took radical grounds in favor of political, social and religious reforms. It supported the ideas of Frances Wright, and offended the pious with its skepticism toward religious authority and practices. Conway's inflammatory views gained him among his enemies the nickname "the vile and speckled reptile."

By March 1833, Conway retired from the editorial chair and left Phillips, the junior editor, in sole charge.

Phillips continued the paper's religious irreverence. In June 1833, impugning the efficacy of religion as a means of warding off cholera, he editorialized: "Religious devotion, we say, is particularly ridiculous, and not more ridiculous than injurious." Concerning those who attended church on special fast days to pray against the disease, he said that they might be divided into two classes, "the cunning but servile sycophant of popularity, and the simple dupes who swallow all, for orthodoxy, which their preachers and leaders tell them." The paper invoked wrath from churches and rival newspapers by calling for the public celebration of the birthday of Thomas Paine. The editor of the Allegheny Democrat, regarding Paine as an "infidel," wrote, "It is to be hoped for the credit of our city that but few will participate in this abominable festival."

== McDonald and T. Phillips years ==
In late 1836, Richard Phillips, around the time he moved west, disposed of the Manufacturer to his brother Thomas Phillips, and Zantzinger McDonald. The newcomers proposed to launch a daily edition of the paper, which began issuing in April 1837 under the name Daily Commercial Bulletin and American Manufacturer. Its nameplate displayed the first half of the title in considerably larger type than the latter half. The politically opposed Pittsburgh Gazette remarked, "In the inside, too, the name Daily Commercial Bulletin appears conspicuously, while its former odious name shuns the light of day and shrinks from the gaze of a long-insulted people."

McDonald and Phillips early on embroiled themselves with rival newspapermen. In one instance, McDonald took an editorial battle from the printed page to the office of the Allegheny Democrat, where he threatened that paper's editor with a large horse pistol. On another occasion, McDonald and Phillips were sued for libel by Neville B. Craig of the Gazette for publishing an item by James Callan defaming Craig's character as a parent. The case would be settled a couple of years later with Phillips (McDonald having died by then) paying the necessary costs and issuing a letter of apology.

The life of the Bulletin came to an early end in January 1838, and the American Manufacturer carried on as a weekly-only publication. The Gazette gave a harsh obituary: "It seems we are to have no more lying Bulletins. That excrescence from the Manufacturer office gave the last sign of vegetation this morning. Its poisonous exhalations have ceased, and hereafter, instead of its daily deadly effusions, we are to have only weekly issues from that corrupt, and corrupting source."

McDonald's tenure with the paper must have been a short one, as he died in July 1838 at the age of 25. Thomas Phillips ended up as sole publisher.

Pittsburgh newspaper consolidation timeline

== Consolidation ==
In September 1842, Thomas Phillips agreed to consolidate the Manufacturer with another Democratic weekly, the Mercury and Democrat, which was itself a recent merger of the Pittsburgh Mercury and the Weekly Pittsburgher and Allegheny Democrat. The final issue of the Manufacturer announced that the combined establishment would issue a new Democratic daily paper, the Daily Morning Post, and a less frequent edition with the same essential content called the Weekly Mercury and Manufacturer. The weekly edition kept the names of its predecessors until 1848, when it was rebranded as the Saturday Morning Post.

The daily Post, originally co-published by Phillips, met with success after other local attempts at Democratic dailies, including that of the Manufacturer in 1837–1838, had failed in short order. After nearly 85 years of publication, the Post united with the Pittsburgh Gazette Times (descended from the Manufacturer's old nemesis, the Gazette) to form the Pittsburgh Post-Gazette.
