= John Chambers (politician) =

American politician (1780–1852)

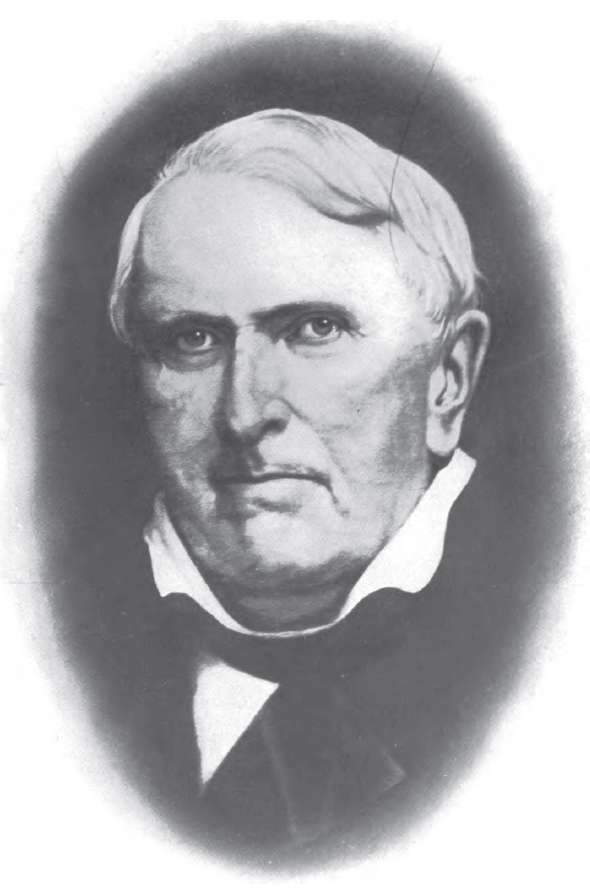
- John Chambers, from an oil painting

2nd Governor of Iowa Territory
- In office May 13, 1841 – November 18, 1845
- Appointed by: William Henry Harrison
- Preceded by: Robert Lucas
- Succeeded by: James Clarke

Member of the U.S. House of Representatives from Kentucky's 12th district
- In office March 4, 1835 – March 3, 1839
- Preceded by: Thomas A. Marshall
- Succeeded by: Garrett Davis

Member of the U.S. House of Representatives from Kentucky's 2nd district
- In office December 1, 1828 – March 3, 1829
- Preceded by: Thomas Metcalfe
- Succeeded by: Nicholas D. Coleman

Member of the Kentucky House of Representatives
- In office 1812; 1815; 1830–1831

Judge of Kentucky's Court of Appeals
- In office 1825–1827

Personal details
- Born: October 6, 1780 Somerset County, New Jersey
- Died: September 21, 1852 (aged 71) Paris, Kentucky
- Party: Anti-Jacksonian, Whig
- Spouse(s): Margaret Taylor (m.1803-her death 1807); Hannah Lee Taylor (m.1807-her death 1832)
- Children: 12 (second marriage)

John Chambers (October 6, 1780 – September 21, 1852) was a U.S. representative from Kentucky and the second governor of the Iowa Territory. He was appointed by President William Henry Harrison.

== Education and early career ==
Chambers was born at Bromley Bridge, Somerset County, New Jersey, on October 6, 1780, a son of Roland Chambers (1744–1821) and Phoebe (Mullican) Chambers.

He attended the public schools and the Transylvania Seminary at Lexington, Kentucky. In 1794 he moved with his father to Washington, Mason County, Kentucky. After studying law he was admitted to the bar in 1800 and commenced practice in Washington, Kentucky. He owned slaves. Chambers served as aide-de-camp to General William Henry Harrison in the War of 1812 and was at the Battle of the Thames. He served as a member of the Kentucky House of Representatives in 1812, 1815, 1830, and 1831. In 1825, Chambers was appointed judge of the Kentucky Court of Appeals. He resigned in 1827.

== U.S. congressional career ==
He was elected as a pro-Adams candidate to the Twentieth Congress to fill the vacancy caused by the resignation of Thomas Metcalfe and served from December 1, 1828, to March 3, 1829; elected as an Anti-Jacksonian to the Twenty-fourth Congress, and reelected as a Whig to the Twenty-fifth Congress (March 4, 1835 – March 3, 1839); chairman, Committee on Claims (Twenty-fifth Congress).

Chambers represented the counties of Pendleton, Bracken, Robertson, Nicholas and Bourbon.

== Personal life ==
He married Margaret Taylor (b. May 22, 1781), daughter of Major Ignatius Taylor (1742–1807), on June 16, 1803. She died on March 4, 1807. They had no surviving children.

He married secondly, on October 29, 1807, to Hannah Lee Taylor (January 9, 1791 – November 11, 1832), daughter of Major Ignatius Taylor with his second wife, Barbara Bowie (1756–1805). Hannah was a half-sister to John's first wife Margaret. John and Hannah had twelve children; Margaret Taylor (1808–1863), Joseph Sprigg Taylor, Hannah Lee Taylor, James Taylor, Matilda Taylor, Francis Taylor, Jane Taylor, Mary Taylor, Laura Taylor, John Taylor, James Taylor, Henry Taylor, Lucretia Taylor.

== After Congress ==
Chambers was appointed Governor of the Iowa Territory in 1841, serving until 1845. He was then appointed commissioner to negotiate a treaty with the Sioux Indians in Minnesota Territory in 1849, and was unsuccessful. He died near Paris, Bourbon County, Kentucky, September 21, 1852, and was interred in the family burial ground at Washington, in Mason County, Kentucky.

U.S. House of Representatives
Preceded by Thomas Metcalfe	Member of the U.S. House of Representatives from Kentucky's 2nd congressional district 1828–1829	Succeeded by Nicholas D. Coleman
Preceded by Thomas A. Marshall	Member of the U.S. House of Representatives from Kentucky's 12th congressional district 1835–1839 (obsolete district)	Succeeded by Garrett Davis
Political offices
Preceded by Robert Lucas	Territorial Governor of Iowa; 1841–1845	Succeeded by James Clarke
