= Floy Little Bartlett =

American musician (1883–1956)

- Born: January 1, 1883; Burlington, Iowa, U.S.
- Died: March 7, 1956 (aged 73)
- Resting place: Aspen Grove Cemetery; Burlington, Iowa, U.S.
- Occupation: Composer

Floy Little Bartlett (January 1, 1883 – March 7, 1956) was an American composer. She wrote many compositions, with one of them appearing in the 1930 sound version of the 1925 silent film The Big Parade. Bartlett also wrote a book for children in 1931 titled The Busy Book.

== Early life ==
Bartlett was born in 1883 to Esther Palmer Little and Dr. George Little in Burlington, Iowa. She attended the Congressional Church in Burlington, where her brother played the organ for 35 years. At 23 years old, Bartlett traveled to Paris to study the violin, and after her trip she was a concert violinist. She married Sidney F. Bartlett of Burlington when she was 25 years old, and the two of them later moved to LaGrange, Illinois. After a move to New York, their son Jack was born, and their daughter Miriam was born six years later. In 1935, she received an honorary degree in music from Knox College in Galesburg, Illinois.

== Career ==
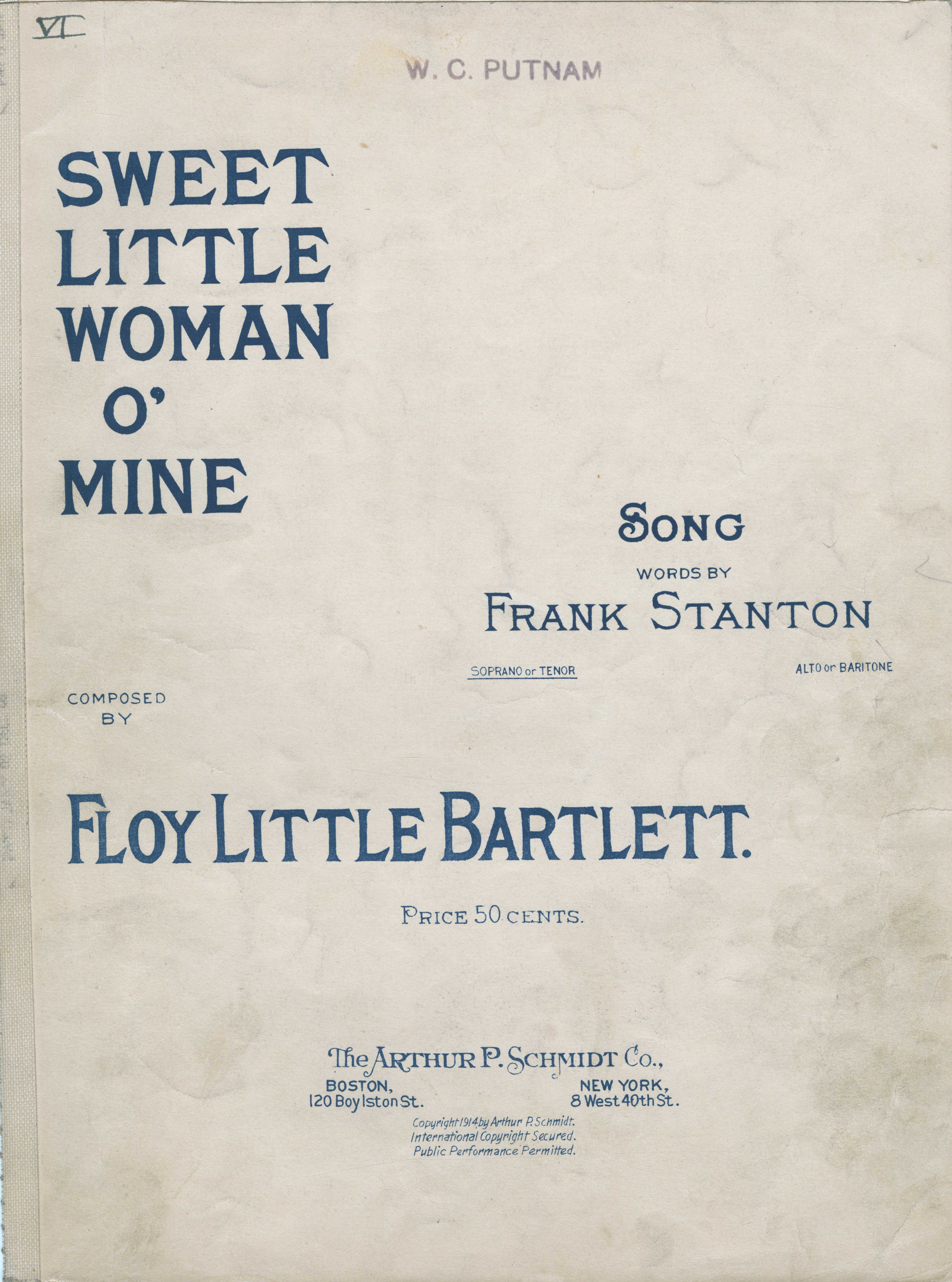
Cover of the sheet music for Sweet Little Woman o' Mine, 1914

On March 20, 1917, the Asbury Park Press said that Bartlett is "one of the most talented of America's women composers" about her later performing at the First M.E. Church. Bartlett sang some of her songs that were for children at the church. On February 14, 1920, Buffalo Evening News wrote "The author of "This Little Woman of Mine" has a marked gift for melody" in a review of one of Bartlett's recitals.

On April 14, 1921, Bartlett was an accompanist and singer of her songs that she composed for children. Musical America said that she was "displaying considerable personal charm" during the performance. On June 22, 1922, The Washington Times wrote, "A dandy little number for concert work is "My Fidil Is Singing" by Floy Little Bartlett". The Montclair Times wrote on December 9, 1925, that Bartlett is a well-known composer.

On May 22, 1923, Bartlett sang on WMAQ in Chicago. She also performed her own compositions on WEAF on January 26, 1924, which The Brooklyn Citizen wrote was "in her delightful soprano voice". In 1928, Bartlett was again featured on WMAQ. The score of her song "Sweet Little Woman o' Mine" was played in the 1925 silent film The Big Parade. Her songs "At Dusk", "A Boy's Philosophy", and "Naughty Boy" have been sung by Ida Geer Weller.

== Publications ==
Bartlett published two of her compositions, "The Swing" and "Little Blue Ribbon", in 1911, which The Des Moines Register reported "met with instant success". "The Swing" had words by Robert Louis Stevenson, and "Little Blue Ribbon" had words by Austin Dobson. The second song was dedicated to the deceased Mrs. Cate Gilbert Wells from Burlington. Kitty Cheatham liked both of the compositions and asked Bartlett for several compositions, including those that were unpublished, to use them on stage. The two compositions were sold in New York City.

Doubleday published The Busy Book by Bartlett about activities that children can do to keep busy. Bartlett wrote the book because of her daughter Miriam. The book includes games, puzzles, and riddles for children. The Busy Book was recommended in January 1923 in The Western Journal of Education for children in the third and fourth grades.

== Death ==
Bartlett died on March 7, 1956, and was buried at the Aspen Grove Cemetery in Burlington, Iowa.

== Bibliography ==
- The Busy Book. with Alida Conover. Garden City, New York: Doubleday, Doran & Company, Inc. 1931. OCLC 5784744.
