= Allegheny Democrat =

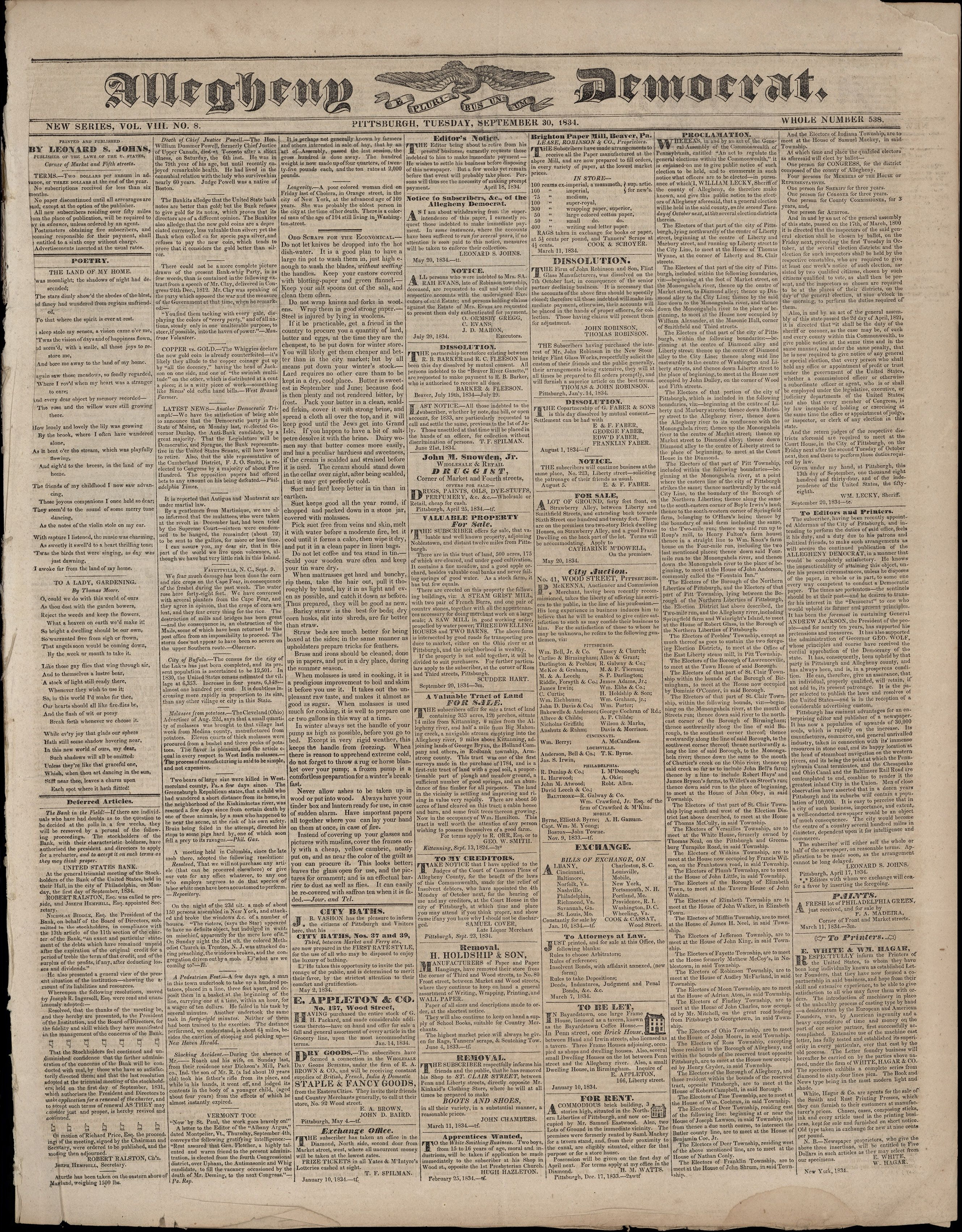
- Front page, 30 September 1834
- Type: Weekly newspaper
- Founder: John McFarland
- Founded: 22 June 1824
- Ceased publication: 24 February 1841
- Political alignment: Democratic
- Language: English
- City: Pittsburgh, Pennsylvania
- Country: United States

The Allegheny Democrat was a newspaper in Pittsburgh, Pennsylvania, published on a mostly weekly basis from 1824 to 1841. Founded in support of Andrew Jackson, it continued as a Democratic Party organ up to its eventual consolidation with the Pittsburgh Mercury.

== Beginning ==
Coming off a series of brief and sometimes stormy newspaper editorships in South Central Pennsylvania, John McFarland established a new paper in 1824 with the express purpose of backing the candidacy of Andrew Jackson in that fall's presidential election. The first issue, published on Wood Street in downtown Pittsburgh, appeared on June 22 of that year under the title Allegheny Democrat, and Farmers' and Mechanics' Advertiser. After three years of promoting Jacksonism, McFarland died in 1827 at the age of 30.

== Johns years ==
Upon McFarland's death the Democrat passed to 22-year-old Leonard Shryock Johns, who would cover Jackson's ascension to the presidency in the election of 1828. The editorial tenure of Johns was marked by an uncritical advocacy of Jackson and his policies, and hostility to the president's bête noire, the United States Bank.

In late 1833, with subscriptions on the rise, Johns increased the publication frequency to semiweekly. He soon thereafter took a post as city alderman and for that reason offered the Democrat for sale, but with no politically compatible buyer forthcoming, retained possession of the paper and reverted it back to weekly publication. Eventually finding a purchaser in 1836, he retired from journalism to focus on his political and business career.

== Stewart ==
Succeeding Johns as owner and editor of the Democrat was Wilson F. Stewart, who promised to continue the paper's support of the national Democratic ticket and opposition to the accumulation of banking power. He appended "Workingmen's Advocate" to the title, indicating his sympathy for the Working Men's Party and the interests of laborers.

Stewart engaged in harsh rhetoric with competitors. One of his editorials provoked Zantzinger McDonald of The American Manufacturer, a rival Democratic sheet, to enter Stewart's office and point a pistol at him. Stewart either bravely fended off his foe or dropped to the floor in fear, depending on whose account is to be believed. On the possibility of a further encounter with McDonald, Stewart wrote, "I am ready in true Yankee fashion to knock the noise out of this sprig of nobility to the entire satisfaction of his friends...a native mechanic against one of the silk stocking nobility." Stewart gave his age at the time as 22.

Stewart sold out in April 1838, less than two years after he embarked on his turbulent journalistic enterprise. The ostensible buyer and new editor was William Jack, formerly connected with the Washington, Pennsylvania Examiner. Some of the local press suspected that the purchase was effected by federal officeholders who disliked Stewart's opposition to President Martin Van Buren's sub-treasury plan, but this notion was repudiated by Jack and by one of the supposed federal schemers, U.S. District Attorney Benjamin Patton.

Pittsburgh newspaper consolidation timeline

== Pittsburgher ==
In 1839, under the management of William Jack and John W. Shugert, the paper spawned a daily edition called the Daily Pittsburgher, while the weekly publication continued as such but under the new name Weekly Pittsburgher, and Allegheny Democrat. Shugert soon left and was replaced by William McElroy.

== Consolidation ==
The Daily Pittsburgher was defunct by the end of 1840, and in February of the following year, its surviving weekly counterpart was purchased by William H. Smith, editor of a competing Democratic journal, the Pittsburgh Mercury. Smith merged the two papers to form the Pittsburgh Mercury and Allegheny Democrat and assured his readers that he would conduct it in the political spirit of its predecessors. The consolidation of the city's Democratic newspapers culminated in September 1842, when the Mercury and Democrat united with the American Manufacturer to create the Daily Morning Post and its weekly edition, the Weekly Mercury and Manufacturer. Eventually, as part of a blockbuster deal in 1927, the Pittsburgh Post-Gazette was born from the combination of the Post and the Pittsburgh Gazette Times.
