= The Mating Call =

1928 film directed by James Cruze

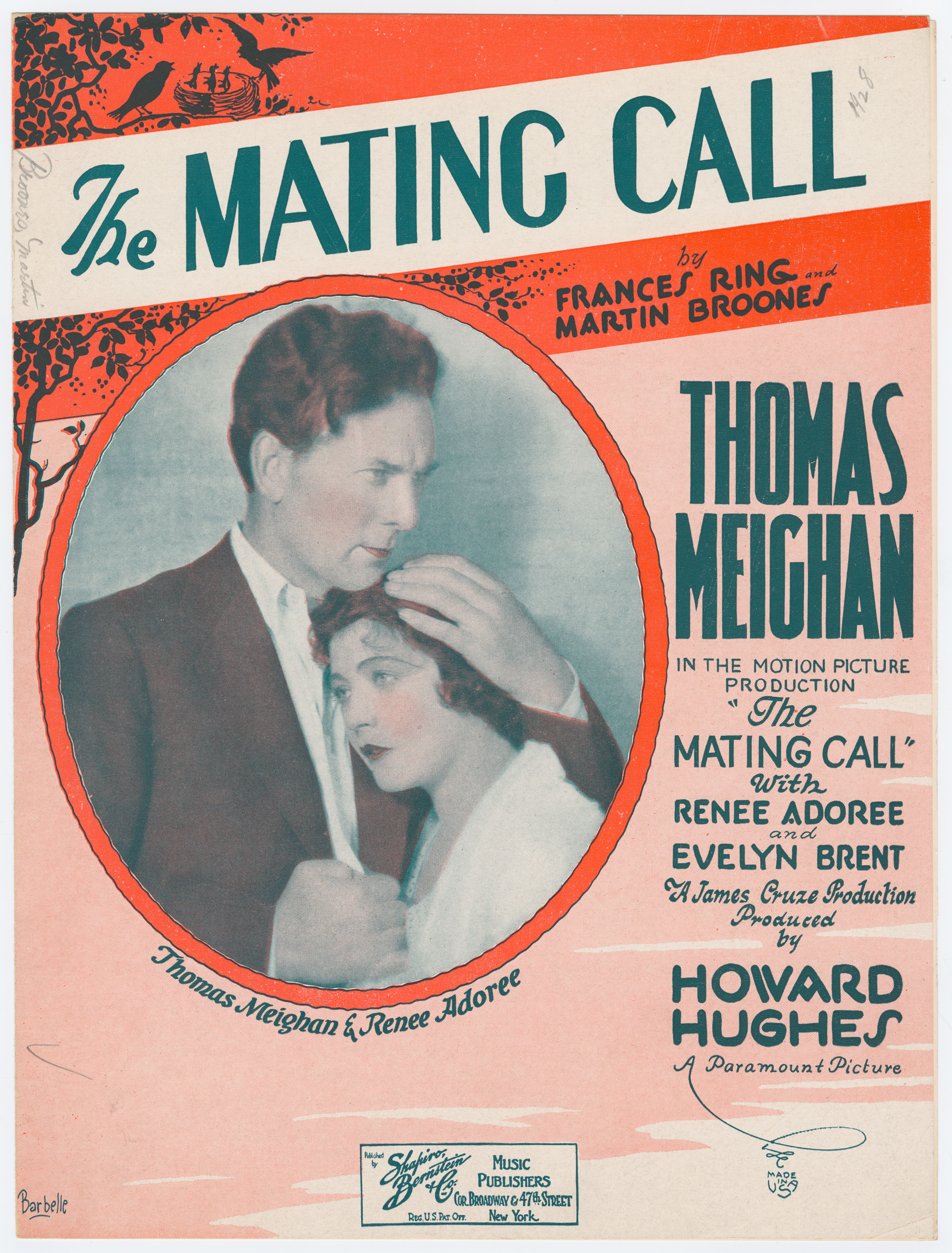
- Cover of sheet music for the film
- Directed by: James Cruze
- Written by: Walter Woods (adaptation); Herman J. Mankiewicz (titles)
- Based on: The Mating Call (novel) by Rex Beach
- Produced by: Howard Hughes (uncredited)
- Starring: Thomas Meighan; Evelyn Brent; Renée Adorée; Alan Roscoe
- Cinematography: Ira H. Morgan
- Edited by: Walter Woods (uncredited)
- Music by: Frances Ring; Martin Roones; Robert Israel (2004)
- Production company: The Caddo Company
- Distributed by: Paramount Pictures
- Release date: July 21, 1928
- Running time: 72 minutes (restored version)
- Country: United States
- Languages: Silent Version; Sound Version (Synchronized); English intertitles
- Budget: $400,000

The Mating Call is a 1928 American silent drama film directed by James Cruze about a soldier who returns home from World War I to find his marriage has been annulled and his wife has remarried. Due to the public apathy towards silent films, a sound version was also prepared. While the sound version has no audible dialog, it was released with a synchronized musical score with sound effects using both the sound-on-disc and sound-on-film process. The film was produced by Howard Hughes for his Caddo Corporation, and was originally released by Paramount Pictures. It is based on the novel of the same name by Rex Beach. Renée Adorée has a brief nude scene in the film.

== Plot ==
Leslie Hatton, a poor farmer, becomes a captain and a war hero in World War I. While on a leave, he secretly marries Rose, the "village belle", but he only has time for a few kisses and a hug before he has to return to the fighting. After the Armistice, Major Hatton comes home, only to be told by Marvin Swallow that his wife's parents have had the marriage annulled, as she was not of age. Rose married wealthy Lon Henderson and the couple went abroad. Les returns to farming.

One day, the Hendersons return. Rose, disillusioned by Lon's repeated infidelity, throws herself at Les. He weakens and embraces her, but then Lon shows up. The two men struggle when Lon pulls out a gun. No one is hurt, and Les invents a French wife on her way to the farm so they will leave him alone.

He goes to Ellis Island in search of a real wife. An official directs him to Catherine and her parents, poor would-be immigrants who are facing deportation. He offers to marry her in exchange for the family being allowed to settle in America. Her parents strongly oppose the bargain, but she accepts. That night, Catherine is prepared to share her bed with her husband, but sensing her resigned attitude, Les decides at the last minute to sleep alone in another room. They gradually fall in love.

Meanwhile, Lon decides to break off his affair with young Jessie Peebles. When Marvin asks her to marry him, she asks for a little time to consider. Les later finds her lifeless body in a pond on his farm. Lon, a member of the local Ku Klux Klan-like Order, insinuates that Les must have had something to do with Jessie's suicide. Les is taken at gunpoint to face vigilante justice. The head of the Order sends for Lon, but decides in his absence that the evidence is overwhelming, and Les is tied up and whipped. The men sent to fetch Lon find him dead in his office and Marvin hiding with a gun. They take him back to the Order meeting. He denies having killed Lon and produces Lon's love letters to Jessie, exonerating Les. The head of the Order rules that, even if Marvin did not kill Lon, he would have been justified to do so. One of his men stages it to look like suicide. (Judge Peebles, Jessie's father, is shown at home, unloading and cleaning his gun. One cartridge has been discharged.)

== Cast ==
- Thomas Meighan as Leslie Hatton
- Evelyn Brent as Rose Henderson
- Renée Adorée as Catherine
- Alan Roscoe as Lon Henderson
- Gardner James as Marvin Swallow
- Helen Foster as Jessie
- Luke Cosgrove as Judge Peebles
- Cyril Chadwick as Anderson
- Will Walling
- Delmer Daves
- Frederic Richard Sullivan

== Production ==
Although the story takes place immediately after World War I (1918–1919), all of Evelyn Brent's and Helen Foster's clothes are strictly in the 1928 short skirt style, which is completely out of place in the time frame of the story. The film does reflect, however, some of the American societal issues following the war. During the war, women had greater freedom regarding employment and their role in society, and there was social pressure after the end of the war for them to return to their pre-war status.

Principal photography took place in Hollywood, San Diego, and Fallbrook, California.

== Music ==
The sound version of the film featured a theme song entitled "The Mating Call" which was composed by Frances Ring and Martin Roones.

== Reception ==
Adorée received positive reviews for her performance in The Mating Call, even though it differed little from the wide-eyed "Euro-damsels" that were her trademark.

== Censorship ==
One controversial scene features a night-time nude swim by Adorée, followed by her wearing a wet chemise. After Ontario censors cut almost 1,000 feet from the film, the draw at the Pantages Theatre in Toronto fell to under $10,000, a drop of $9,000 from the prior week. Canadian distributors, when serious cuts were required by censors such that plot continuity was damaged, had adopted a policy to decline to show "butchered" films and instead returned the film to the United States to save the import duty.

== Preservation ==
A print of The Mating Call, long thought to be lost, was discovered in the archives of Howard Hughes at the University of Nevada, Las Vegas. The Mating Call was preserved by the Academy Film Archive, in conjunction with UNLV, in 2016.
