= Nicholas Bouquet =

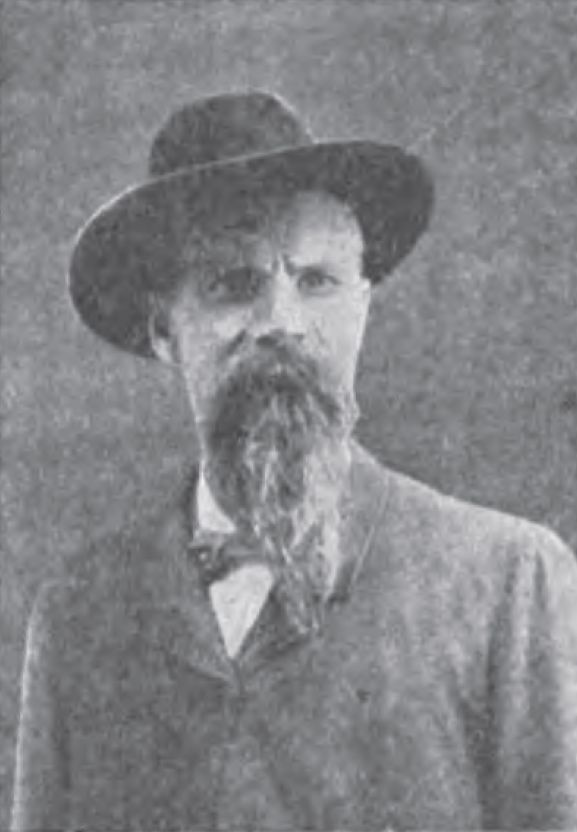
- Born: November 14, 1842; Kingdom of Bavaria
- Died: December 27, 1912 (aged 70); Burlington, Iowa, U.S.
- Burial place: Aspen Grove Cemetery; Burlington, Iowa, U.S.
- Military career
- Allegiance: United States of America
- Branch: United States Army
- Service years: 1861, 1862 - 1865
- Rank: Sergeant
- Unit: 1st Regiment Iowa Volunteer Infantry
- Conflicts: American Civil War; Battle of Wilson's Creek
- Awards: Medal of Honor

Nicholas S. Bouquet (14 November 1842 – 27 December 1912) was a German soldier who fought in the American Civil War. Bouquet received the United States' highest award for bravery during combat, the Medal of Honor, for his action during the Battle of Wilson's Creek in Missouri on 10 August 1861. He was honored with the award on 16 February 1897.

== Biography ==
Bouquet was born in the Kingdom of Bavaria on 14 November 1842. He was sent to the United States in order to prevent him serving in the army in Germany. Before the breakout of the American Civil war he worked as a cooper and barrel maker in Burlington. He enlisted into the 1st Iowa Infantry at Burlington, Iowa in April 1861.

During the Battle of Wilson's Creek, Bouquet assisted another gunner from Company A, which was manning the Totten's Battery, in retrieving a disabled gun and preventing it from being captured by the Confederates.

He joined the 25th Iowa Infantry as a sergeant in July 1862, and mustered out with this regiment in June 1865.

Bouquet is buried at Aspen Grove Cemetery in Burlington.

== Medal of Honor citation ==
Voluntarily left the line of battle, and, exposing himself to imminent danger from a heavy fire of the enemy, assisted in capturing a riderless horse at large between the lines and hitching him to a disabled gun, saved the gun from capture.

== See also ==
- List of American Civil War Medal of Honor recipients: A–F
