= Nicholas D. Coleman =

American politician (1800–1874)

Postmaster of Vicksburg, Mississippi
- In office 1841–1844

Member of the U.S. House of Representatives from Kentucky's 2nd district
- In office March 4, 1829 – March 3, 1831
- Preceded by: John Chambers
- Succeeded by: Thomas A. Marshall

Member of the Kentucky House of Representatives
- In office 1824–1825

Personal details
- Born: Nicholas Daniel Coleman; April 22, 1800 Cynthiana, Kentucky, U.S.
- Died: May 11, 1874 (aged 74) Vicksburg, Mississippi, U.S.
- Resting place: Cedar Hill Cemetery, Vicksburg, Mississippi, U.S.
- Party: Jacksonian
- Education: Transylvania College
- Occupation: Politician, lawyer

Nicholas Daniel Coleman (April 22, 1800 – May 11, 1874) was a U.S. representative from Kentucky.

== Biography ==
Born in Cynthiana, Kentucky, Coleman attended the grammar and high schools. He was graduated from Transylvania College, Lexington, Kentucky. He studied law. He was admitted to the bar and practiced. He served as member of the State House of Representatives in 1824 and 1825.

Coleman was elected as a Jacksonian to the Twenty-first Congress (March 4, 1829 – March 3, 1831). He moved to Vicksburg, Mississippi, where he resumed the practice of law. Postmaster of Vicksburg 1841–44. He again resumed the practice of law. He died in Vicksburg, Mississippi. He was interred in Cedar Hill Cemetery.

U.S. House of Representatives
Preceded by John Chambers	Member of the U.S. House of Representatives from Kentucky's 2nd congressional district 1829–1831	Succeeded by Thomas A. Marshall
