= Renée Adorée =

French actress (1898–1933)

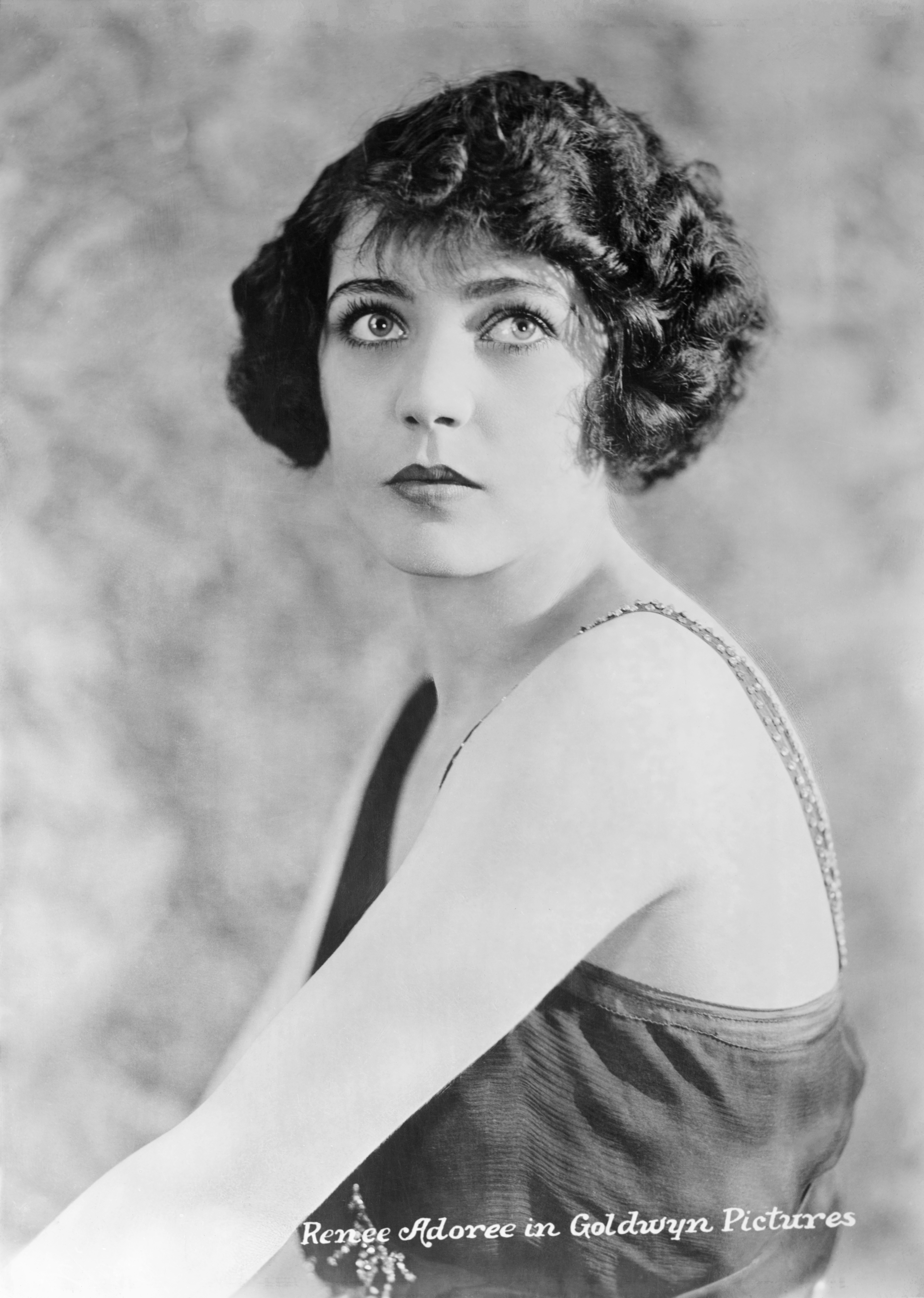
- Renée Adorée, c. 1922
- Born: Jeanne de la Fonte; 30 September 1898; Lille, France
- Died: 5 October 1933 (aged 35); Tujunga, California, U.S.
- Resting place: Hollywood Forever Cemetery
- Occupation: Actress
- Years active: 1914–1930
- Spouses: Tom Moore (m. 1921; div. 1926) William Sherman Gill (m. 1927; div. 1929)

Renée Adorée (French pronunciation: [ʁəne adɔʁe]; born Jeanne de la Fonte [ʒan də la fɔ̃t]; 30 September 1898 – 5 October 1933) was a French stage and film actress who appeared in Hollywood silent movies during the 1920s. She is best known for portraying the role of Melisande, the love interest of John Gilbert in the melodramatic romance and war epic The Big Parade. Adorée's career was cut short after she contracted tuberculosis in 1930. She died of the disease in 1933 at the age of 35.

== Early life ==
Born in Lille as Jeanne de la Fonte, Adorée was the daughter of circus artists and performed regularly with her parents as a child. She performed as an acrobat, dancer and bareback rider throughout Europe. She adopted the stage name Renée Adorée (French for "reborn" and "adored", both in the feminine form), and established a reputation for her dancing skills in countries including Belgium, France, Germany and Sweden. She was performing in Brussels when World War I began.

She was billed as Renée Adorée in an Australian film produced in 1918, £500 Reward, which was her movie debut. She was then a dancer touring Australia on the Tivoli circuit with an act called "The Magneys".

== Career ==
Adorée went to New York City in 1919, where she was cast in a vaudeville-style musical called Oh, Uncle. This opened at the Garrick Theatre in Washington, D.C. in March 1919; by mid March, it was being staged in Trenton, New Jersey, and subsequently toured through the summer. In July, it was renamed Oh, What a Girl! and opened at the Shubert Theatre in New York City. Over the next several months, she toured in The Dancer, another Shubert production.

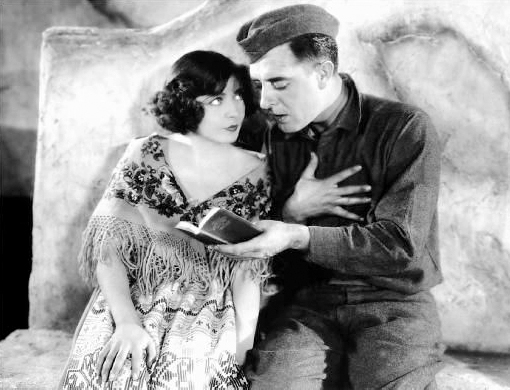
Adorée with John Gilbert in The Big Parade (1925)

In January 1920, the opportunity arose for her to further her motion picture career when she was cast for the lead role in The Strongest, directed by Raoul Walsh. The Strongest was a dramatic photoplay written by French prime minister Georges Clemenceau. She went on to star in several other silent films in the early 1920s, including Reginald Barker's The Eternal Struggle, the film which established her as a Hollywood star and also starred Barbara La Marr and Earle Williams.

Adorée is most famous for her role as Melisande in the melodramatic romance and war epic The Big Parade (1925) opposite John Gilbert. It became one of MGM's highest-grossing silent films, earning between $18 million and $22 million, and made her into a major star.

In all, Adorée made nine films with Gilbert and appeared in four with leading Hollywood actor Ramón Novarro. She starred with Lon Chaney in 1927's Mr. Wu. In 1928, Ruth Harriet Louise photographed Adorée, for Eve: The Lady's Pictorial .

In 1928, The Mating Call, a film produced by Howard Hughes, Adorée had a very brief swimming scene in the nude. In 1930, Alfred Cheney Johnston photographed Adorée, in the nude.

== Personal life ==
While in New York City on New Year's Eve 1921, she met Tom Moore, who was fifteen years her senior. Moore and his brothers were Irish immigrants who had become popular Hollywood actors. Six weeks after their meeting, on 12 February 1921, Adorée married Moore at his home in Beverly Hills, California. The marriage ended in divorce in 1926. In June 1927, Adorée married again, this time to William Sherman Gill whom, in 1929, she also divorced.

== Illness and death ==
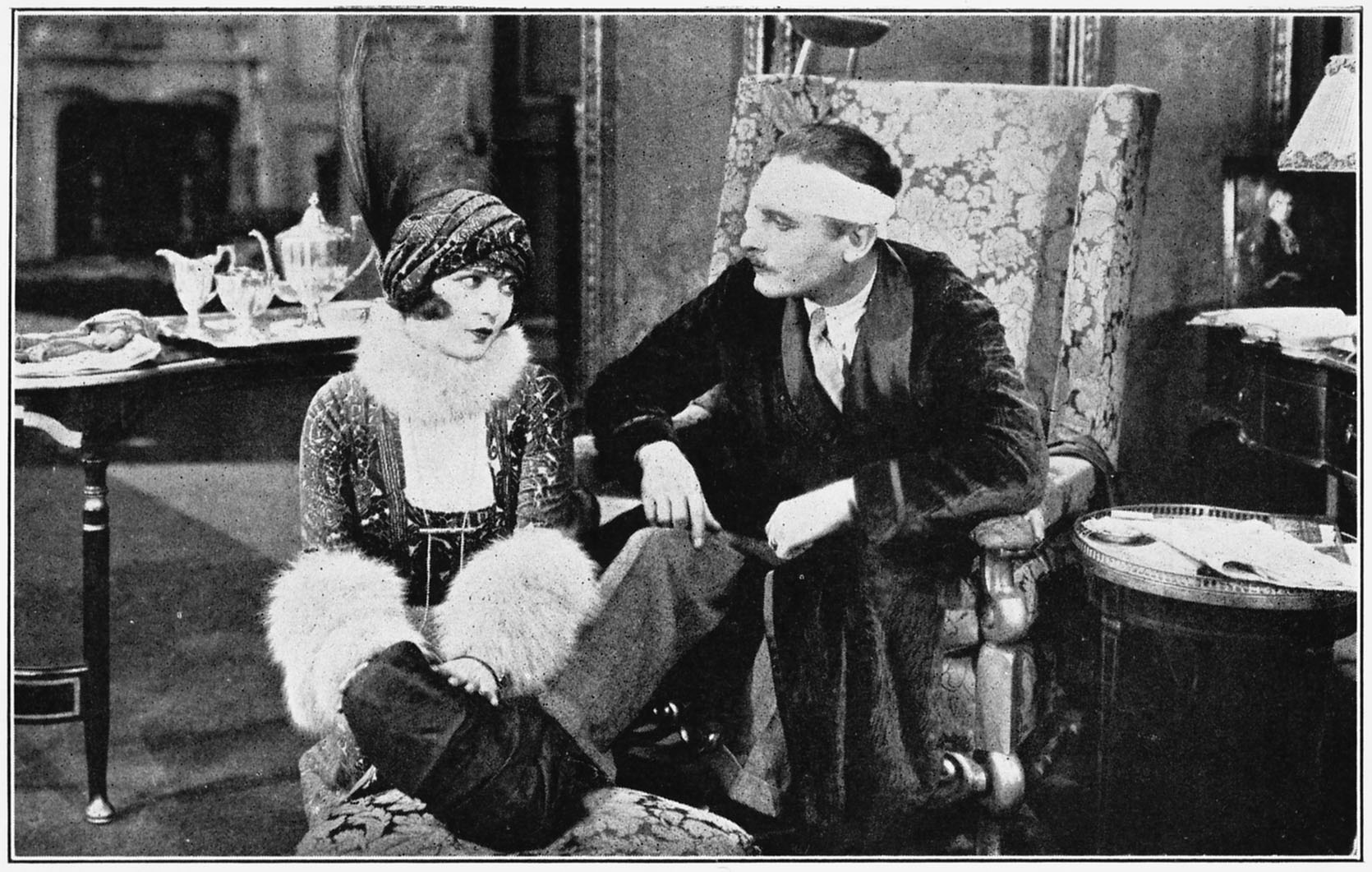
Adorée and Lew Cody in Elinor Glyn's production Man and Maid for Metro-Goldwyn-Mayer, 1925

With the advent of sound in film, Adorée was one of the fortunate stars whose voice met the film industry's new needs, appearing in two all-talking films before her death. By the end of 1930, Adorée had appeared in forty-five films, the last four of which were sound pictures. That year, she was diagnosed with tuberculosis. Adorée went against her physician's advice by finishing her final film Call of the Flesh with Ramón Novarro. At its completion, she was rushed to a sanatorium in Prescott, Arizona, where she lay flat on her back for two years in an effort to regain her physical health. In April 1933, she left the sanatorium. At this point, it was thought she had recovered sufficiently to resume her screen career, but she swiftly weakened and her health declined day by day. In September 1933, Adorée was moved from her modest home in the Tujunga Hills to the Sunland health resort in Los Angeles. She died there on October 5, 1933. She is interred in the Hollywood Forever Cemetery.

Adorée left an estate valued at $2,429, equivalent in value to $62,223.51 in 2026. The only heir was her mother, who lived in England. No will was found. For her contributions to the film industry, Adorée has a motion pictures star on the Hollywood Walk of Fame at 1601 Vine Street.

== Filmography ==
Year	Title	Role	Notes
1918	£500 Reward	Irene	
1920	The Strongest	Claudia	Lost film
1921	Made in Heaven	Miss Lowry	Lost film
1922	Day Dreams	The Girl	Incomplete film
1922	Honor First	Moira Serern	Lost film
1922	Mixed Faces	Mary Allen Sayre	Lost film
1922	Monte Cristo	Eugenie Danglars, her daughter	
1922	A Self-Made Man		Lost film
1922	West of Chicago	Della Moore	Lost film
1923	The Six-Fifty	Hester Taylor	Lost film
1923	The Eternal Struggle	Andrée Grange	
1924	The Bandolero	Petra	Lost film
1924	Defying the Law	Lucia Brescia	Lost film
1924	A Man's Mate	Wildcat	Lost film
1924	Women Who Give	Becky Keeler	
1925	Exchange of Wives	Elise Moran	
1925	Excuse Me	Francine	Lost film
1925	Man and Maid	Suzette	Lost film
1925	Parisian Nights	Marie	
1925	The Big Parade	Melisande	
1926	Blarney	Peggy Nolan	Lost film
1926	The Flaming Forest	Jeanne Marie	
1926	La Bohème	Musette	
1926	The Blackbird	Mademoiselle Fifi Lorraine	
1926	The Exquisite Sinner	Silda, a gypsy maid	Lost film
1926	Tin Gods	Carita	Lost film
1927	Back to God's Country	Renee DeBois	
1927	Heaven on Earth	Marcelle	Lost film
1927	Mr. Wu	Wu Nang Ping	
1927	On Ze Boulevard	Musette	
1927	The Show	Salome	
1928	A Certain Young Man	Henriette	Lost film
1928	The Cossacks	Maryana	
1928	Forbidden Hours	Marie de Floriet	
1928	The Mating Call	Catherine	
1928	Show People	Herself	Cameo
1928	The Michigan Kid	Rose Morris	
1928	The Spieler	Cleo d'Alzelle	
1929	The Pagan	Madge	
1929	Tide of Empire	Josephita Guerrero	
1930	Redemption	Masha	
1930	Call of the Flesh	Lola	

== Bibliography ==
- Bermingham, Cedric Osmond (1931). Stars of the Screen 1931, A volume of biographies of contemporary actors and actresses engaged in photoplay throughout the world. London: Herbert Joseph.
- Stuart, Ray (1965). Immortals of the Screen. New York: Bonanza Books.
- "Renée Adorée". Stars of the Photoplay. Chicago: Photoplay Magazine. 1924.
