= Pittsburgh Mercury =

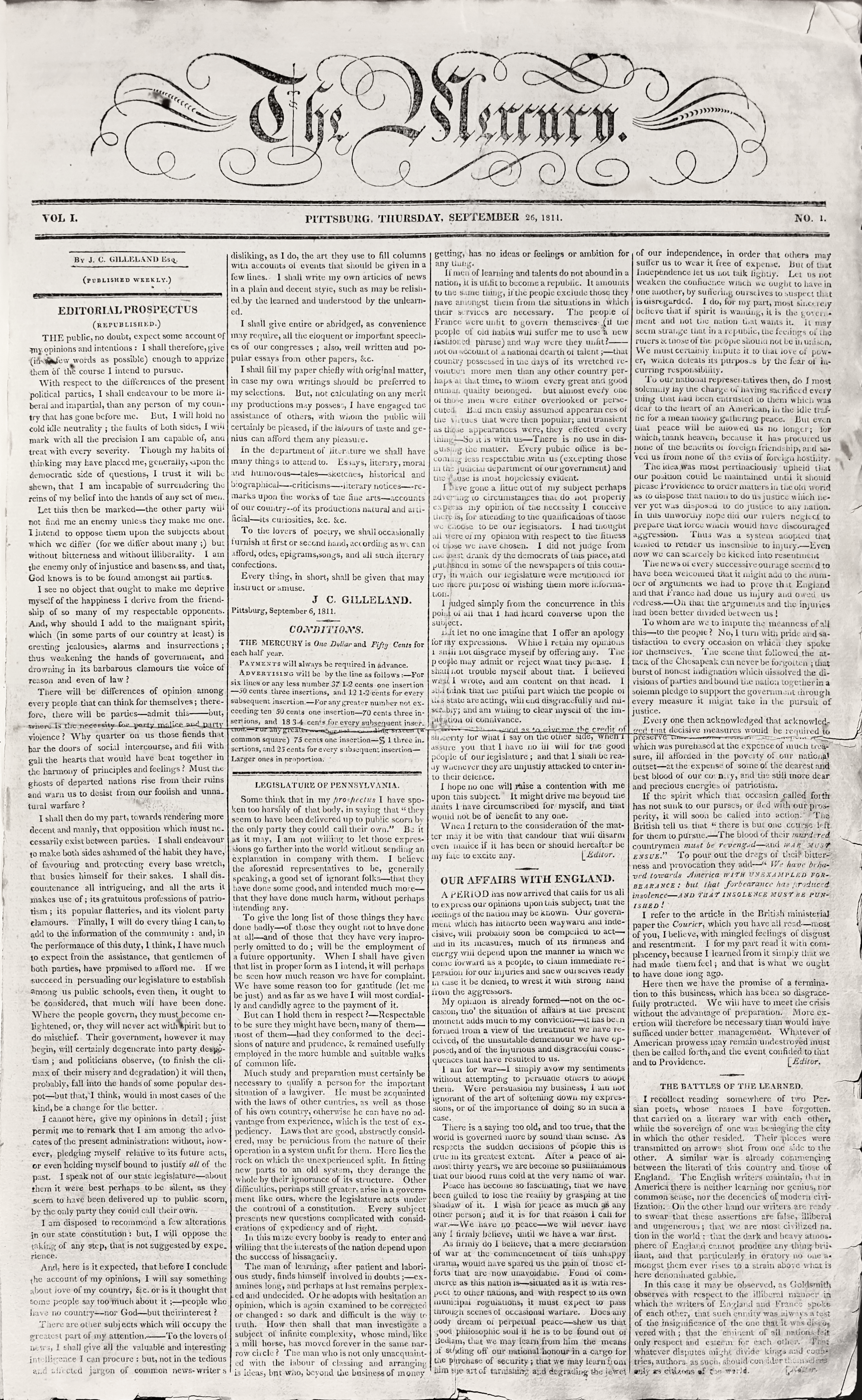
- Front page of first issue
- Type: Weekly newspaper
- Format: Broadsheet
- Founder: James C. Gilleland
- Founded: September 26, 1811
- Ceased publication: 1842 (merged)
- Political alignment: Democratic-Republican; Democratic
- Language: English
- Headquarters: Pittsburgh, Pennsylvania, United States

The Pittsburgh Mercury was a weekly newspaper published in Pittsburgh, Pennsylvania from 1811 to the early 1840s. Originally almost unpartisan, it became a mouthpiece of the Democratic-Republicans, and later of the Jacksonians and Democrats. It was a progenitor of the Pittsburgh Post, which in turn was succeeded by the Pittsburgh Post-Gazette.

John M. Snowden

== Publishers ==
The Mercury began weekly publication on 26 September 1811, with James C. Gilleland as editor and proprietor. Within a year it was purchased by John M. Snowden, who while at the helm of the paper attained prominent local political posts, including Mayor of Pittsburgh in 1825–1828.

In early 1830, Snowden was succeeded by his son Joseph in the conduct of the Mercury. The son retired in 1835, passing the paper to Robert Morrow and William H. Smith. Smith assumed sole control in 1840.

== Mergers and name changes ==
Pittsburgh newspaper consolidation timeline

The Mercury in 1832 absorbed a startup paper called the Allegheny Republican, and for about the next two years was published under the title Pittsburgh Mercury and Allegheny Republican.

In 1841, the Weekly Pittsburgher and Allegheny Democrat joined with the Mercury to form the Pittsburgh Mercury and Allegheny Democrat, with the Mercury's Smith as publisher.

Seeing a need for a daily Democratic newspaper in Pittsburgh, Smith in 1842 arranged with Thomas Phillips, owner-editor of a competing Democratic weekly called The American Manufacturer, to unite their establishments and launch the Daily Morning Post. Begun in tandem with the Post was an edition called the Weekly Mercury and Manufacturer, consisting of matter from the past week's daily issues. The Post continued as a Democratic organ until its 1927 merger with the Pittsburgh Gazette Times to create the Pittsburgh Post-Gazette.
