= Aspen Grove Cemetery (Burlington, Iowa) =

Historic cemetery in Des Moines County, Iowa

- Interactive map of Aspen Grove Cemetery

Details
- Established: 1843
- Location: Burlington, Iowa
- Country: United States
- Website: Official website
- Find a Grave: Aspen Grove Cemetery
- Aspen Grove Cemetery; Historic District
- U.S. National Register of Historic Places
- U.S. Historic district
- Location within Iowa Location within the United States
- Coordinates: 40°49′40″N 91°07′11″W
- NRHP reference No.: 100007633
- Added to NRHP: April 22, 2022

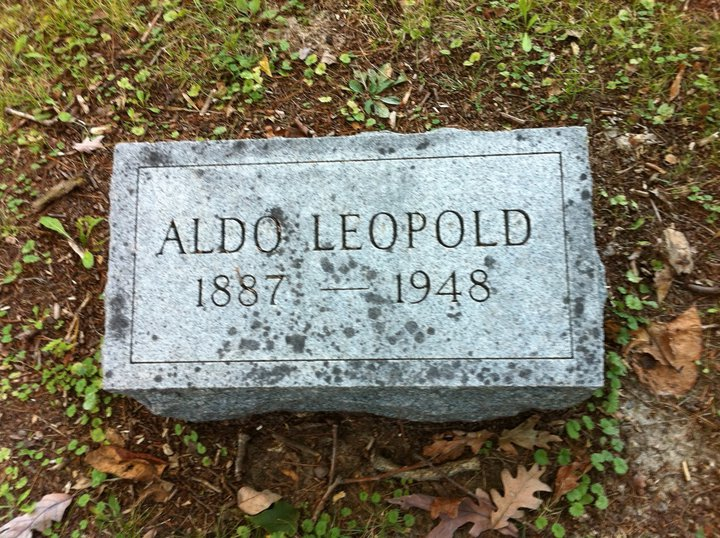
Aldo Leopold's grave at the Leopold family plot in Burlington, IA in the Aspen Grove Cemetery.

Aspen Grove Cemetery is a cemetery in Burlington, Iowa. In 2022, it was listed as a historic district on the National Register of Historic Places.

== History ==
Aspen Grove Cemetery was established in 1843. The Aspen Grove Cemetery Association was approved by the Legislature of the Iowa Territory in December 1843 and they first met on January 3, 1844. Charles Starker, the first president of the Cemetery Association, designed and laid out a large portion of the cemetery.

Initially, ten acres were purchased in 1844 and an additional eight acres were purchased shortly after. In 1866, 32 more acres were purchased for the cemetery. Between 1867 and 1875, the cemetery had 2,173 interments. By 1887, the cemetery had near 9,000 interments. By 1935, the cemetery had 32,000 interments and had expanded to around 100 acres.

By 1930, the cemetery started expanding to the north, laying out roads closer to Sunnyside Avenue.

== Notable interments ==
- G. F. A. Atherton (1790–1882), member of the Wisconsin State Assembly and Wisconsin Legislature
- Tony Baker (1945–1998), NFL player of the New Orleans Saints, Philadelphia Eagles, Los Angeles Rams, and San Diego Chargers
- Floy Little Bartlett (1883–1956), composer
- Nicholas Bouquet (1842–1912), Medal of Honor recipient and soldier in the Civil War
- James Clarke (1812–1850), 3rd governor of Iowa Territory
- John M. Corse (1835–1893), general in the Union Army, lieutenant governor of Iowa
- Augustus C. Dodge (1812–1883), U.S. Representative from Iowa Territory, U.S. minister to Spain, U.S. senator from Iowa
- Henry Dodge (1782–1867), U.S. Representative, Senator, and Governor of the Wisconsin Territory
- John H. Gear (1825–1900), 11th governor of Iowa
- James Isham Gilbert (1823–1884), general in the Union Army
- James W. Grimes (1816–1872), 3rd governor of Iowa and U.S. senator
- Benton Jay Hall (1835–1894), U.S. Representative From Iowa
- Thomas Hedge (1844–1920), U.S. Representative from Iowa
- John Flournoy Henry (1793–1873), U.S. Representative from Kentucky
- Jacob Gartner Lauman (1813–1867), businessman and general in the Union Army
- Isaac Leffler (1788–1866), American lawyer and U.S. Representative from Virginia
- Shepherd Leffler (1811–1879), U.S. Representative from Iowa
- Aldo Leopold (1887–1948), author, conservationalist, and educator
- Charles L. Matthies (1824–1868), Union Army officer
- William Butler Remey (1842–1895), colonel in the Union Army
- Jeremiah Smith Jr. (1802–1862), representative of the Wisconsin Territorial Assembly
- Joseph Champlin Stone (1829–1902), U.S. Representative from Iowa
