= Harrison Hunter =

Scottish-American actor

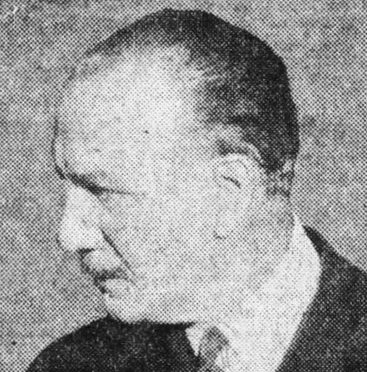
- Born: 1870; Nashville, Tennessee
- Died: January 2, 1923 (aged 53); Boston, Massachusetts
- Occupation: Actor

Harrison Hunter (1870 – January 2, 1923) was a Scottish-American actor. Hunter was born to Scottish parents who were visiting Nashville, Tennessee. His parents took him back to Scotland; he was raised in the United Kingdom and began his acting career there. He married actress Sidney Crowe. In 1892 they had a daughter, who later performed under the name Leah Bateman. Hunter returned to the United States in 1899 as a member of the theatrical company of Olga Nethersole. He stayed and purchased a farm in Brookfield, Massachusetts.

Hunter's Broadway performances included The Way of the World (1901), Pippa Passes (1906), and The Thirteenth Chair (1916). His only film credit was for Raoul Walsh's The Strongest in 1920.

Hunter's final role was as the title character in The Bat, a stage mystery about a murderous criminal nicknamed "the Bat", who is looking for hidden money in a Long Island mansion. Hunter's character claims to be a police detective, but is revealed as the Bat in the final scene. The producers kept the twist ending a secret from the cast until the dress rehearsal. Hunter was upset to learn that his character was a criminal, but the play was a huge hit. He stuck with the role through a Broadway run of over two years, then continued with a touring company. While the show was playing in Boston, Hunter entered the Massachusetts Homeopathic Hospital for surgery and died of complications a week later on January 2, 1923.
