= Thomas A. Marshall =

American politician

Thomas Alexander Marshall

Chief Justice of the Kentucky Court of Appeals
- In office 1866–1867
- Preceded by: Belvard J. Peters
- Succeeded by: Belvard J. Peters
- In office 1854–1856
- Preceded by: Elijah Hise
- Succeeded by: B. Mills Crenshaw
- In office 1847–1851
- Preceded by: Iphraim M. Ewing
- Succeeded by: James Simpson

Member of the Kentucky House of Representatives from Louisville's 3rd district
- In office August 3, 1863 – August 7, 1865
- Preceded by: Joshua Tevis
- Succeeded by: John M. Armstrong

Member of the Kentucky House of Representatives
- In office 1827–1829

Justice of the Kentucky Court of Appeals
- In office 1835–1856
- Preceded by: Samuel S. Nicholas
- Succeeded by: Alvin Duvall

Member of the U.S. House of Representatives from Kentucky
- In office March 4, 1831 – March 3, 1835
- Preceded by: Nicholas D. Coleman (2nd); Chittenden Lyon (12th)
- Succeeded by: Albert G. Hawes (2nd); John Chambers (12th)
- Constituency: 2nd district (1831-33); 12th district (1833–35)

Personal details
- Born: January 15, 1794 Woodford County, Kentucky
- Died: April 17, 1871 (aged 77) Louisville, Kentucky
- Resting place: Lexington Cemetery
- Party: National Republican
- Relations: Son of Humphrey Marshall
- Education: Yale College
- Profession: Lawyer

Thomas Alexander Marshall (January 15, 1794 – April 17, 1871) was a U.S. Representative from Kentucky, son of Humphrey Marshall (1760–1841).

Born near Versailles, Kentucky, Marshall pursued preparatory studies. He graduated from Yale College in 1815, and then studied law. He was admitted to the bar and commenced practice in Frankfort in 1817. He moved to Paris, Kentucky, in 1819. He served as a member of the Kentucky House of Representatives in 1827 and 1828.

Marshall was elected as an Anti-Jacksonian to the Twenty-second and Twenty-third Congresses (March 4, 1831 – March 3, 1835). He was an unsuccessful candidate for reelection in 1834 to the Twenty-fourth Congress. He served as judge of the State court of appeals 1835–1856. He was professor in the law department of Transylvania College, Lexington, Kentucky from 1836 to 1849. He moved to Louisville in 1859. He served again as a member of the state house of representatives in 1863. He was chief justice of the court of appeals in 1866 and 1867. He died in Louisville, Kentucky, April 17, 1871, and his remains were interred at Lexington Cemetery.

U.S. House of Representatives
Preceded by Nicholas D. Coleman	Member of the U.S. House of Representatives from Kentucky's 2nd congressional district 1831–1833	Succeeded by Albert G. Hawes
Preceded by Chittenden Lyon	Member of the U.S. House of Representatives from Kentucky's 12th congressional district 1833–1835 (obsolete district)	Succeeded by John Chambers
