= Robert Lucas (governor) =

Former Governor of Ohio and Territorial Governor of Iowa

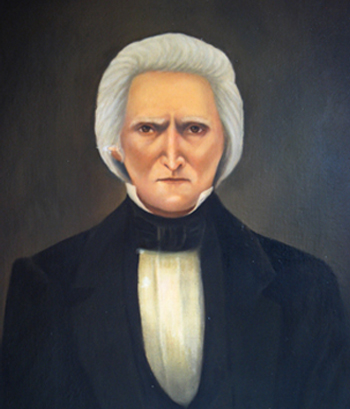

1st Governor of Iowa Territory
- In office August 15, 1838 – May 13, 1841
- Appointed by: Martin Van Buren
- Preceded by: William B. Conway (acting Governor)
- Succeeded by: John Chambers

12th Governor of Ohio
- In office December 7, 1832 – December 12, 1836
- Preceded by: Duncan McArthur
- Succeeded by: Joseph Vance

11th and 15th Speaker of the Senate of Ohio
- In office December 7, 1818 – December 5, 1819
- Preceded by: Abraham Shepherd
- Succeeded by: Allen Trimble
- In office December 7, 1829 – December 5, 1830
- Preceded by: Samuel Wheeler
- Succeeded by: Samuel R. Miller

Member of the Ohio Senate from Gallia, Scioto, Pike, Lawrence and Jackson
- In office 1814–1822
- Preceded by: Lewis Summers
- Succeeded by: William Kendall
- In office 1824–1828
- Preceded by: William Kendall
- Succeeded by: William Kendall

Member of the Ohio House of Representatives
- In office 1808–1809

Personal details
- Born: April 1, 1781 Mecklenburg, Virginia, U.S. (now Shepherdstown, West Virginia)
- Died: February 7, 1853 (aged 71) Iowa City, Iowa, U.S
- Party: Democratic-Republican; Democratic
- Spouse(s): Elizabeth Brown (m.1810-her death 1812); Friendly Ashley Sumner (m.1816)
- Relations: 1807-1815
- Children: 8
- Profession: Surveyor, military officer, politician, farmer

Military service
- Allegiance: United States
- Branch/service: Ohio State Militia
- Rank: Brigadier General
- Battles/wars: War of 1812

Robert Lucas (April 1, 1781 – February 7, 1853) was the 12th governor of Ohio, serving from 1832 to 1836. He later served as the first governor of the Iowa Territory from 1838 to 1841. Lucas was a central figure in the Toledo War and the Honey War.

== Early life ==
Lucas was born in 1781 in what was then Mecklenburg, Virginia (his birthplace's location in modern times is known as Shepherdstown, West Virginia). He was the son of William Lucas and Susannah Barnes. Lucas came from a Quaker family whose roots stretched back to 1679 in Pennsylvania, though the family had recently moved to Virginia.

Lucas's father, an American Revolutionary War veteran, owned enslaved people and large amounts of land. According to family legend, Robert's uncle, Joseph Barnes, built a steam-powered boat long before Fulton's invention. Robert received some early schooling in mathematics and surveying, skills that would prove invaluable to his future work.

Around the age of nineteen, Lucas moved to the Scioto Valley of the Northwest Territory, now Ohio. He was preceded by other family members, including two older brothers and a cousin. One brother would become a general, while his other brother and his cousin would become Ohio legislators. The family bought large parcels of land; eventually the town of Lucasville was named for them.

== Military career ==
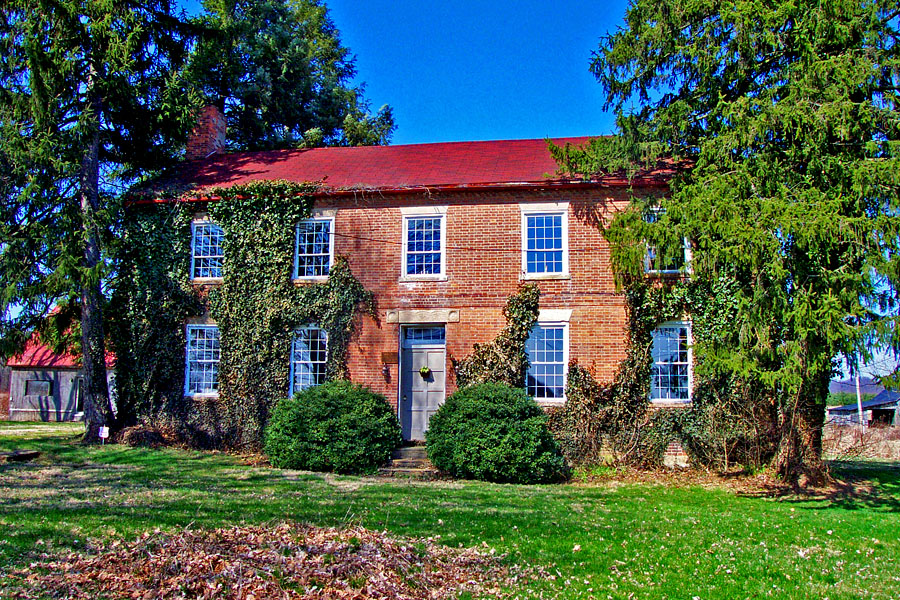
Friendly Grove, Lucas's house near Piketon

For his skill in recruiting troops for the Army during the increasing hostilities between England, France, and the U.S., Robert Lucas was made captain in 1807. Lucas served in the War of 1812 and was famous for his resourcefulness and calm in an increasingly chaotic campaign. As one of his contemporaries stated, "As a spy he was productive and brave — as a soldier he had no superior."

Lucas rose to national prominence during the court-martial trial of General William Hull. Hull was accused of incompetence in the loss of Detroit and the Michigan Territory to the British in June 1812, and the journals Lucas kept during the campaign were used as evidence to convict Hull.

Through complex political maneuvering, Lucas was made a brigadier general in 1810 of the Ohio state militia.

== Political career ==
Lucas was elected to the Ohio General Assembly for the first time in 1808 as a member of the Ohio House of Representatives.

His political career blossomed and in 1818 he was named Speaker of the Ohio State Senate, he was succeeded in 1819 by Allen Trimble, who would also go on to be governor. He was the Ohio presidential elector in 1820 for James Monroe. In 1822, he lost the state Senate election to his former brother-in-law and political rival, William Kendall. Around 1824, Lucas built a large brick house two miles east of Piketon, named Friendly Grove, which became an epicenter of local political activity, and still stands today.

Lucas regained his state Senate seat in 1824, and campaigned for Andrew Jackson. He was an Ohio presidential elector in 1828 for Andrew Jackson. Lucas again lost his Senate seat in 1828 to Kendall, and Lucas was part of the electoral congress that elected Jackson president that year. Lucas won his Senate seat back in 1829, in a special election after Kendall resigned; again, he was elected Senate speaker. In 1831, Lucas ran for the state assembly and lost, but he quickly rebounded.

=== Ohio Governor, 1832–1836 ===
As an ardent Democrat, perhaps the highlight of his career was to serve as the chairman and president of the 1832 Democratic National Convention, the Democratic Party's first national convention. Lucas was also nominated the Democratic candidate for governor in 1832, and won after a vitriolic campaign. Lucas County, Ohio, was established and named for the governor during his second term, in defiance of the Michigan Territory, which also claimed the land around the mouth of the Maumee River, thus provoking the almost-bloodless Toledo War.

=== Iowa Territorial Governor, 1838–1841 ===
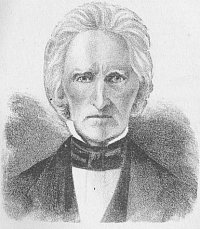
Lucas in Iowa

During his tenure running Iowa, he again showed his tendency towards conflict with other states, starting the Honey War with Missouri. Technically, Lucas was not the first acting governor of the Iowa territory. William B. Conway, appointed territorial secretary by Martin Van Buren, arrived in Iowa six weeks before Lucas and thus assumed the duties of acting governor. Friction developed between Lucas and Conway over some of the decisions Conway made in Lucas's absence, and led to an acerbic relationship. Lucas was often at odds with the territorial legislature, his liberal use of absolute veto power and his condescending rebukes of legislators often made him the target of acrimonious exchanges. Conway complained to Van Buren that Lucas committed "vexatious, ungraceful, petulant, ill-natured and dogmatic interferences" with the legislature. Van Buren and the U. S. Congress responded by limiting the territorial governor’s veto power and his ability to make appointments. Lucas served for only a few years as territorial governor, from 1838 to 1841, and spent those years mostly in Burlington, Iowa and Muscatine, Iowa (then called Bloomington), as there were only provisional accommodations in Iowa City for the territorial legislature.

== Personal life ==
He married Elizabeth Brown, his landlord's daughter, on April 4, 1810. The couple had a daughter, Minerva, in 1811. Elizabeth died in 1812. He remarried, to Friendly Ashley Summer, on March 7, 1816.

== Death and legacy ==
Lucas died in Iowa City and was buried in Oakland Cemetery in Iowa City, Iowa.

Lucas's retirement house in Iowa City, Plum Grove, is maintained by the state as a monument to Lucas.

Robert Lucas Elementary School in the Iowa City Community School District is named in his honor.

== Bibliography ==
- Gilpin, Alec R. (1958) The War of 1812 in the Old Northwest. Michigan State University Press, Lansing, Michigan.
- Parish, John C. (1948) Iowa in the Days of Lucas. Palimpsest 29:13–18.
- Petersen, William J. (1948) Robert Lucas. Palimpsest 29:1–12.
- Petersen, William J. (1952) The Story of Iowa: The Progress of an American State. Lewis Historical Publishing, New York.
- Ryan, Daniel J. (1912) History of Ohio: The Rise and Progress of an American State. Vol. 3, Century History Co., New York.
- Shambaugh, Benjamin F. (editor) 1906 Executive Journal of Iowa 1838–1841: Governor Robert Lucas. State Historical Society of Iowa, Iowa City.
- Swisher, Jacob A. (1948) Plum Grove. Palimpsest 29:19–32.
- Taylor, William Alexander; Taylor, Aubrey Clarence (1899). Ohio statesmen and annals of progress: from the year 1788 to the year 1900 ... Vol. 1. State of Ohio. p. 102.
- Verchères de Boucherville, Thomas (1940)War on the Detroit: The Chronicles of Thomas Verchères de Boucherville and the Capitulation by an Ohio Volunteer. Edited by Milo M. Quaife. Lakeside Press, Chicago.
- Wright, Luella M. (1944) Robert Lucas in Verse. Palimpsest 25:234–248.

Party political offices
| First | Democratic Party nominee for Governor of Ohio; 1830, 1832, 1834 | Succeeded by Eli Baldwin |
Political offices
| Preceded by Abraham Shepherd | Speaker of the Ohio Senate; 1818–1819 | Succeeded by Allen Trimble |
| Preceded by Duncan McArthur | Governor of Ohio; 1832–1836 | Succeeded by Joseph Vance |
| Preceded by William B. Conway (acting appointee) | Governor of Iowa Territory; 1838–1841 | Succeeded by John Chambers |
Ohio House of Representatives
| New district | Representative from Scioto County; 1808–1809 | Succeeded by Daniel McKinney |
Ohio Senate
| Preceded by Lewis Summers | Senator from Gallia and Scioto Counties; 1814–1816 | District eliminated |
| New district | Senator from Gallia, Scioto, Pike, and Jackson Counties; 1816–1818 | Succeeded by Himself as Senator from Gallia, Lawrence, Scioto, Pike, and Jackson Counties |
| Preceded by Himself as Senator from Gallia, Scioto, Pike, and Jackson Counties | Senator from Gallia, Lawrence, Scioto, Pike, and Jackson Counties; 1818–1820 | District eliminated |
| New district | Senator from Pike, Scioto, and Lawrence Counties; 1820–1822 | Succeeded by William Kendall |
| Preceded by William Kendall | Senator from Pike, Scioto, and Lawrence Counties; 1824–1828 | District eliminated |
