= The Big Parade =

1925 film directed by King Vidor

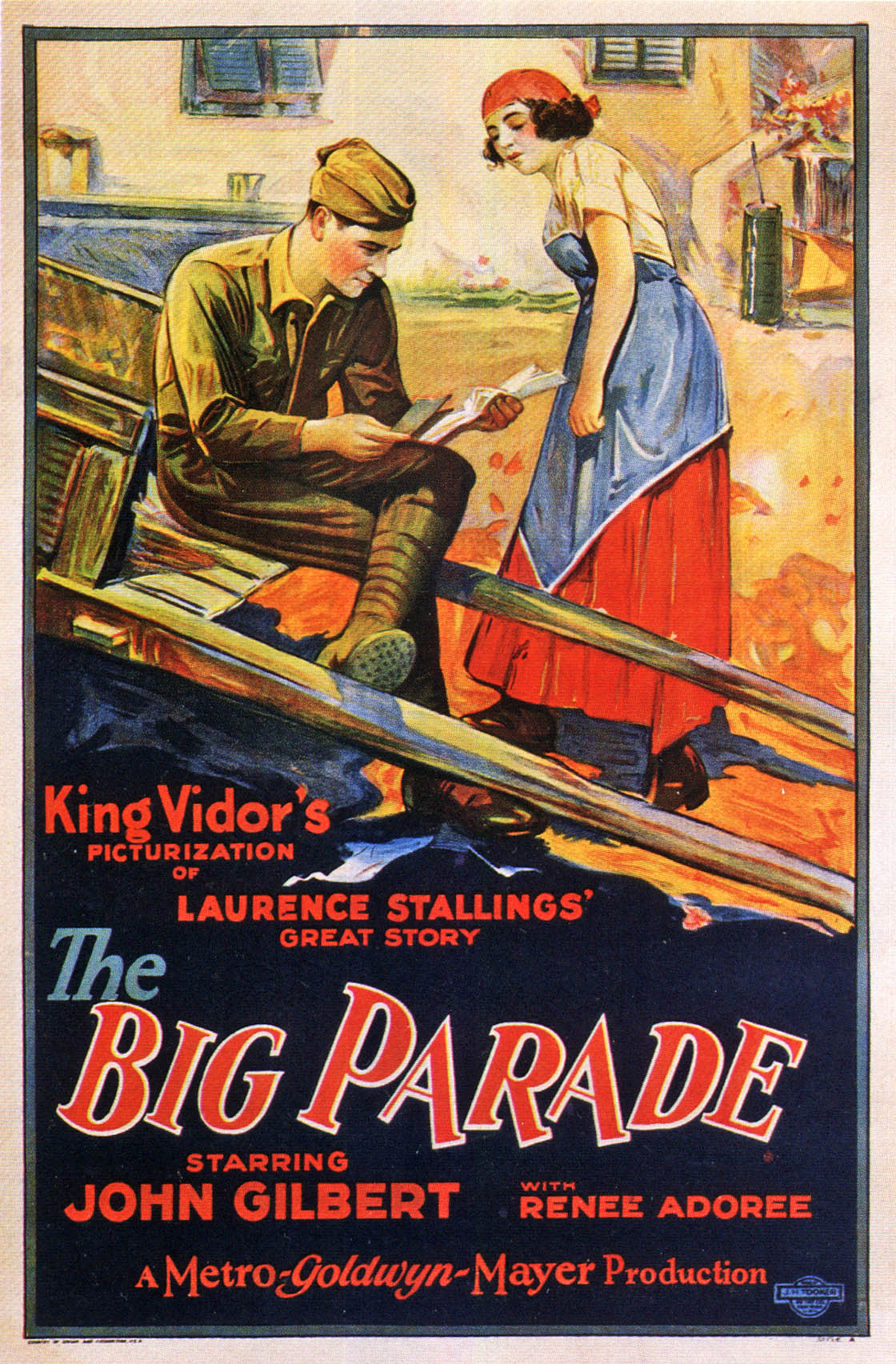
- Theatrical release poster
- Directed by: King Vidor
- Screenplay by: Harry Behn (scenario); Joseph W. Farnham (titles)
- Story by: Laurence Stallings
- Produced by: King Vidor (presented by); Irving Thalberg (uncredited)
- Starring: John Gilbert; Renée Adorée; Hobart Bosworth; Tom O'Brien; Karl Dane
- Cinematography: John Arnold
- Edited by: Hugh Wynn
- Music by: William Axt; David Mendoza
- Production company: Metro-Goldwyn-Mayer
- Distributed by: Loew's Incorporated
- Release date: November 5, 1925 (USA)
- Running time: 151 minutes
- Country: United States
- Languages: Silent film, English intertitles
- Budget: $382,000
- Box office: $18–22 million (theatrical rental)

The Big Parade is a 1925 American silent war drama film directed by King Vidor, starring John Gilbert, Renée Adorée, Hobart Bosworth, Tom O'Brien, and Karl Dane. Written by World War I veteran Laurence Stallings, the film is about an idle rich boy who joins the U.S. Army's Rainbow Division, is sent to France to fight in World War I, becomes a friend of two working-class men, experiences the horrors of trench warfare, and finds love with a French girl. A sound version of the film was released in 1930. While the sound version of the film has no audible dialog, it featured a synchronized musical score with sound effects using both the sound-on-disc and sound-on-film process.

The film has been praised for its realistic depiction of warfare, and it heavily influenced a great many subsequent war films, especially All Quiet on the Western Front (1930). The Big Parade is regarded as one of the greatest films made about World War I, and, in 1992, was selected for preservation in the United States National Film Registry by the Library of Congress.

== Plot ==
The Big Parade (1925)

The Big Parade (1925; 1929 sound re-release)

In the United States in 1917, James "Jim" Apperson's idleness, in contrast to his hardworking brother, incurs the great displeasure of his wealthy businessman father. Then America enters World War I. Jim informs his worried mother that he has no intention of enlisting, and his father threatens to kick him out of the house if he does not join. However, when he runs into his patriotic friends at a send-off parade, he is persuaded to enlist, making his father very proud.

During training, Jim makes friendships with Southern construction worker Slim and Bronx bartender Bull. Their unit ships out to France, where they are billeted at a farm in the village of Champillon in the Marne.

All three men are attracted to Melisande, whose mother owns the farm. She repulses all their advances, but gradually warms to Jim, bonding at first over chewing gum. They eventually fall in love, despite not being able to speak each other's language. One day, however, Jim receives a letter and a photograph from Justyn, which reveals that they are engaged. When Melisande sees the picture, she realizes the situation and runs off in tears. Before Jim can decide what to do, his unit is ordered to the front. Melisande hears the commotion and races back, just in time for the lovers to embrace and kiss.

The Americans march towards the front and are strafed by an enemy fighter before it is shot down. The unit is sent to the attack immediately, advancing against snipers and machine guns in the woods, then more machine guns, artillery, and poison gas in the open. They settle down in a makeshift line. Jim shelters in a shellhole with Slim and Bull.

That night, orders come down for one man to go out and eliminate a troublesome mortar crew; Slim wins a spitting contest for the opportunity. He succeeds, but is spotted and wounded on the way back. After listening to Slim's pleas for help, Jim cannot stand it any longer and goes to his rescue against orders. Bull follows, but is shot and killed. By the time Jim reaches Slim, he is already dead. Jim is then shot in the leg. When a German comes to finish him off, Jim shoots and wounds him. The German starts crawling back to his line. Jim catches up to him in another shellhole, but, face to face, cannot bring himself to finish him off with his bayonet. Instead, he gives his erstwhile enemy a cigarette. Soon after, the German dies. However, Jim is not stuck in no man's land for long; the Americans attack, and he is taken away to a hospital.

From another patient, he learns that Champillon has changed hands four times. Worried about Melisande, Jim sneaks out of the hospital and hitches a ride. When he gets to the farmhouse, he finds it damaged and empty. Melisande and her mother have joined a stream of refugees. Jim collapses and is carried off in an ambulance by retreating soldiers.

After the war ends, Jim goes home to America. Before he arrives, his mother overhears Justyn and Jim's brother Harry discussing what to do; in Jim's absence, they have fallen in love. When Jim appears, it is revealed that he has had his leg amputated. Later, Jim tells his mother about Melisande; she tells him to go back and find her. When he returns to the farm, Melisande rushes into his arms.

== Cast ==
- John Gilbert as James Apperson
- Renée Adorée as Melisande
- Hobart Bosworth as Mr. Apperson
- Claire McDowell as Mrs. Apperson
- Claire Adams as Justyn Reed
- Robert Ober as Harry Apperson
- Tom O'Brien as Bull
- Karl Dane as Slim
- Rosita Marstini as Melisande's mother
- Harry Crocker as Soldier (uncredited)
- Julanne Johnston as Justine Devereux
- Kathleen Key as Apperson sister
- Carl Voss as Officer (uncredited)
- George Beranger as German soldier
- Frank Currier
- Dan Mason

== Music ==
The 1930 sound version featured a number of songs. The theme song was entitled "My Dream of the Big Parade" and was composed by Al Dubin (words) and Jimmy McHugh (music). Other songs featured on the soundtrack include "I'm Gonna Tramp Tramp Tramp" by B. G. DeSylva and Harry Woods, "Sweet Little Woman of Mine" by Frank Stanton (words) and Floy Little Bartlett (music), "My Pal Jerry" by Fred Rose and "Douce Fievre (Whisper That You Love Me)" by Louis Weslyn (words) and Y. Ener (music).

== Reception ==
The official trailer of The Big Parade

The Big Parade was one of the great hits of the 1920s earning gross rentals of $4,990,000 in the United States and $1,141,000 overseas on a budget of $382,000 during its initial release, with MGM recording a profit of $3.4 million, its biggest of the silent era. The domestic earnings were MGM's biggest until the release of Gone with the Wind (1939). It played in some larger cities continually for a year or more, boosting Gilbert's career and made Renée Adorée a major star, although Adorée would soon be diagnosed with tuberculosis and die only a few years later. Its release in some nations of the British Empire was initially delayed to resolve claims that the film, in focusing only on America's part in the war, was propaganda. The film ultimately grossed $18–$22 million in worldwide rentals and is sometimes proclaimed as the most successful film of the silent era, although it is most likely this record falls to The Birth of a Nation (1915). The film won the Photoplay Magazine Medal for best film of the year in 1925. The medal is considered the first significant annual movie award, prior to the establishment of the Oscars.

After the film's producers found a clause in Vidor's contract that entitled the director to 20% of the net profits, studio lawyers called for a meeting with him. At the meeting, accountants upgraded the costs of the picture and downgraded their forecast of its potential success. Vidor was thus persuaded to sell his stake in the film before he could receive his percentage. However, the film's tremendous success established Vidor as one of MGM's top directors.

== Legacy ==
The Big Parade survives in a print of the 1930 sound version. The original silent version is now lost. In 1992, The Big Parade was selected for preservation in the United States National Film Registry by the Library of Congress as being "culturally, historically, or aesthetically significant".

Although the surviving print had the original 1930 soundtrack consisting of William Axt's musical score, the version released to the public had the score replaced with a modern one. Composer Carl Davis created a new orchestral score for the film in the 1980s (quoting the theme associated with Melisande in Axt's original setting), and it was added to the film and released on video in the late 1980s as part of the MGM and British television Thames Silents project. The original 1930 35mm negative was subsequently discovered intact, and has been the source for theatrical showings and the DVD and Blu-ray editions (Blu-ray was released October 1, 2013). In spite of the fact that William Axt's synchronized score survives the film was again released with a modern score that bears no resemblance to the original score.

The 2013 DVD and Blu-ray Warner Home Video release of The Big Parade features the most complete TCM print of running time 151 minutes. It also contains an audio commentary track by film historian Jeffrey Vance (with excerpts from King Vidor's oral history with the Directors Guild of America). In February 2020, the film was shown at the 70th Berlin International Film Festival, as part of a retrospective dedicated to King Vidor's career.

== Gallery ==
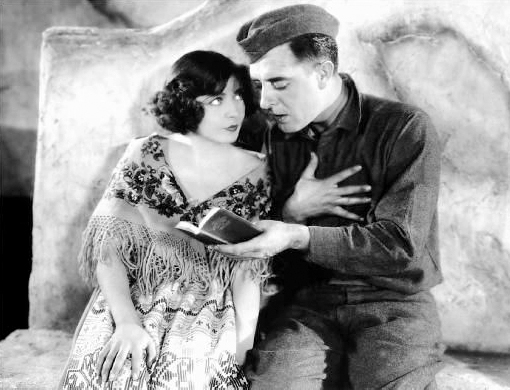
Renée Adorée and John Gilbert

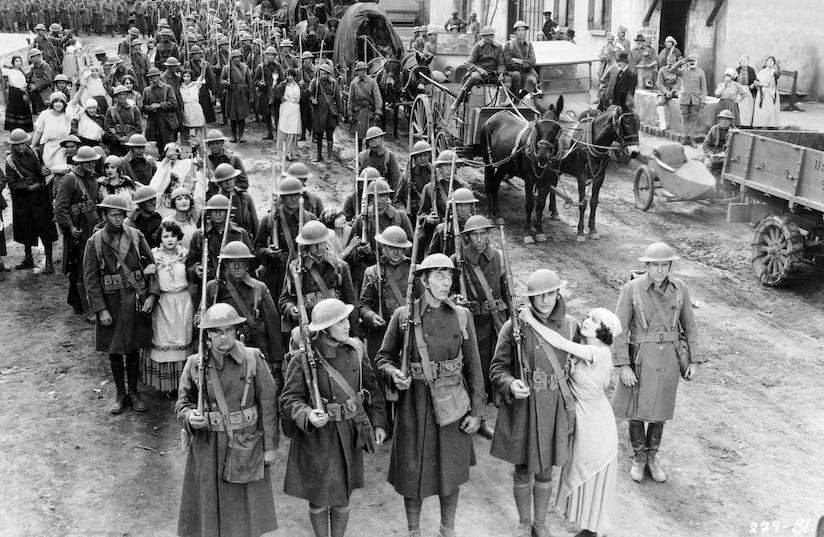
The Big Parade, Lower right front (R to L): Renée Adorée, John Gilbert, Karl Dane, Tom O'Brien

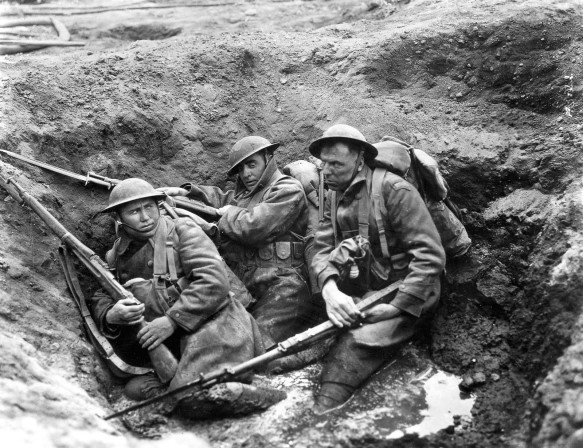
L to R Tom O'Brien, John Gilbert, Karl Dane

== See also ==
- List of early color feature films
