= Chittenden Lyon =

American politician

Member of the U.S. House of Representatives from Kentucky
- In office March 4, 1827 – March 3, 1835
- Preceded by: John Flournoy Henry
- Succeeded by: Linn Boyd
- Constituency: 12th district (1827–1833); 1st district (1833–1835)

Member of the Kentucky House of Representatives from Caldwell County
- In office 1822–1825
- Preceded by: Enoch Prince
- Succeeded by: Enoch Prince

Personal details
- Born: February 22, 1787 Fair Haven, Vermont, U.S.
- Died: November 23, 1842 (aged 55) Eddyville, Kentucky, U.S.
- Resting place: Eddyville Cemetery, Eddyville, Kentucky
- Party: Jacksonian
- Spouse(s): Nancy Vaughn (m. 1817-1828, her death); Frances (Baker) Jones (m. 1829-1842, his death)
- Relations: Matthew Lyon (father); Thomas Chittenden (grandfather); Martin Chittenden (uncle)
- Children: 8
- Occupation: Merchant; Farmer

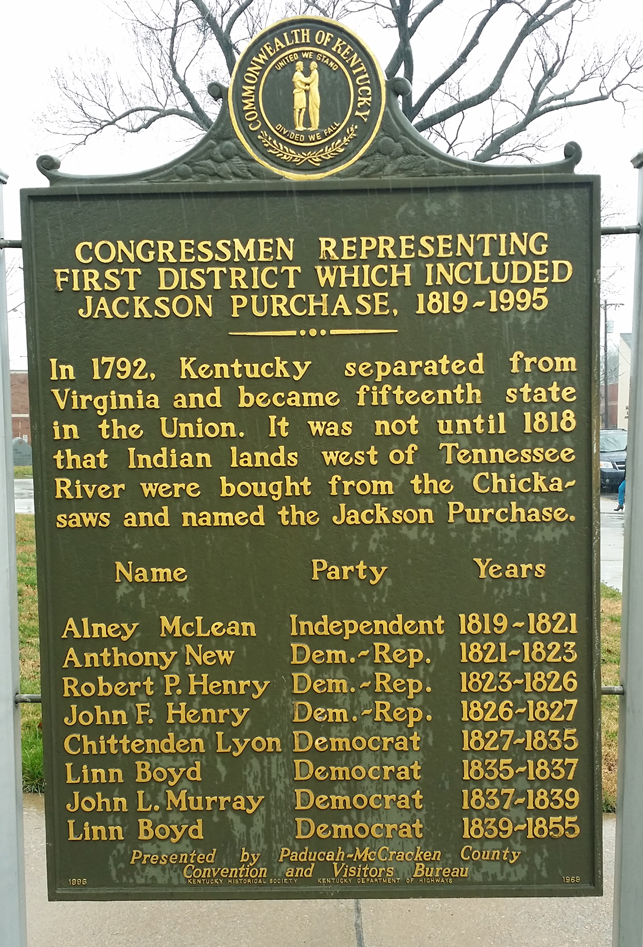
Sign in front of the McCracken, Kentucky Courthouse (in Paducah, Kentucky) commemorating early members of the U.S. House of Representatives representing Jackson Purchase (U.S. historical region). The "First District" in the title actually changed over time. It refers to the Jackson Purchase, which was in the 5th district from 1819 to 1823, the 12th district until 1833, and then the 1st district until the end of the sign's lineage in 1855.

Chittenden Lyon (February 22, 1787 – November 23, 1842) was an American businessman and politician from Kentucky. He was most notable for his service as a United States representative from 1827 to 1833.

== Biography ==
Chittenden Lyon was born in Fair Haven, Vermont, on February 22, 1787, the son of Matthew Lyon and Beulah (Chittenden) Lyon. Beulah Lyon was the daughter of Governor Thomas Chittenden and the sister of Governor Martin Chittenden. Chittenden Lyon attended the common schools of Fair Haven before the Lyon family moved to Kentucky in 1801. The Lyons settled in Caldwell County, Kentucky, and after completing his education, Lyon became a successful merchant and farmer in Eddyville. He owned slaves. According to descriptions by his contemporaries, Lyon was a "giant," well over six feet tall and nearly 350 pounds.

As a Democratic-Republican, Lyon was a member of the Kentucky House of Representatives from 1822 to 1825. In 1826, Lyon was elected to the United States House of Representatives as a Jacksonian. He was reelected three times, and served from March 4, 1827, to March 3, 1835. He was not a candidate for reelection in 1834, and returned to his business and farming interests. Lyon died in Eddyville, on November 23, 1842, and was buried in Eddyville Cemetery. In 1842, he had been elected to the Kentucky House of Representatives, but he died before the start of the term and never took his seat.

== Family ==
In 1817, Lyon married Nancy Vaughn (1796–1828). In 1829, he married Frances (Baker) Jones (1802–1866). With her first husband, Frances Lyon was the mother of Edmund W. Jones (1822–1853).

With his first wife, Lyon was the father of:

- Mary Ann (1818–1873)
- Margaret Aurelia (b. 1820)
- Matthew Skinner (1823–1891)
- Giles James Nelson (b. 1825)
- Chittenden Patton (1827–1863)

With Frances Baker, Lyon was the father of:

- Helen Minerva (1830–1880)
- Loraine Elvira (1831–1840)
- Thompson Archer (1833–1899)

Margaret Lyon was the first wife of U.S. Senator Willis Benson Machen.

== Legacy ==
Lyon County, Kentucky, which was separated from Caldwell County, Kentucky in 1854, was named in his honor.

U.S. House of Representatives
Preceded by John F. Henry	Member of the U.S. House of Representatives from Kentucky's 12th congressional district 1827–1833 (obsolete district)	Succeeded by Thomas A. Marshall
Preceded by Henry Daniel	Member of the U.S. House of Representatives from Kentucky's 1st congressional district 1833–1835	Succeeded by Linn Boyd
