= Robert Pryor Henry =

American politician

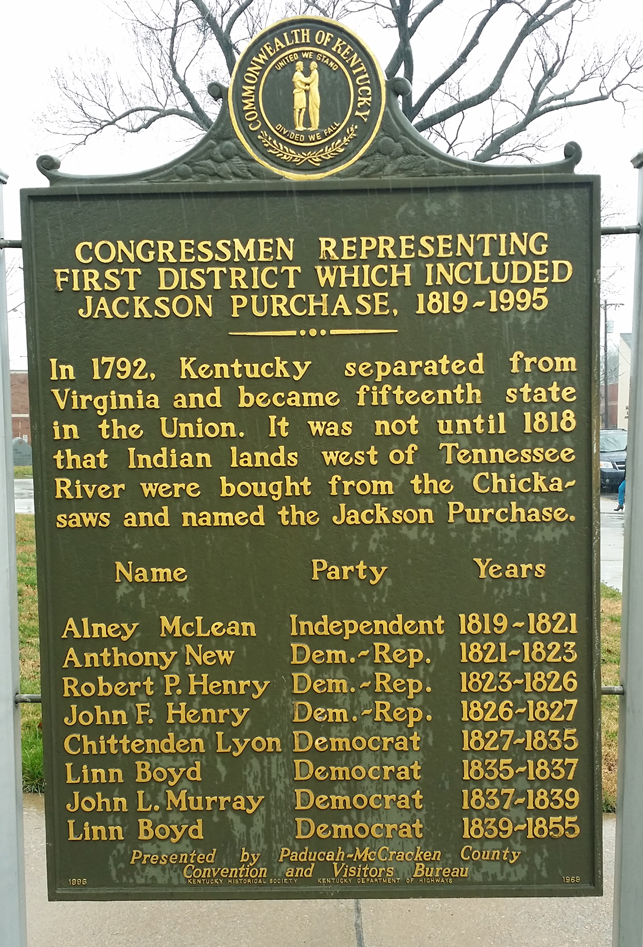
- Sign in front of the McCracken, Kentucky Courthouse (in Paducah, Kentucky) commemorating early members of the U.S. House of Representatives representing Jackson Purchase (U.S. historical region). The "First District" in the title actually changed over time. It refers to the Jackson Purchase, which was in the 5th district from 1819 to 1823, the 12th district until 1833, and then the 1st district until the end of the sign's lineage in 1855.

Member of the U.S. House of Representatives from Kentucky's 12th district
- In office March 4, 1823 – August 25, 1826
- Preceded by: District Created
- Succeeded by: John Flournoy Henry

Personal details
- Born: November 24, 1788 Henrys Mills, Kentucky
- Died: August 25, 1826 (aged 37) Hopkinsville, Kentucky
- Party: Jackson Republican
- Education: Transylvania College

Military service
- Allegiance: United States
- Battles/wars: War of 1812

Robert Pryor Henry (November 24, 1788 – August 25, 1826) was a U.S. representative from Kentucky.

Born in Henrys Mills, Kentucky (then a part of Virginia), Henry pursued classical studies. He graduated from Transylvania College in Lexington, Kentucky. After this he studied law. He was admitted to the bar in 1809 and commenced practice in Georgetown, Kentucky.

He served as prosecuting attorney in 1819. Previous to that he served in the War of 1812. He had moved to Hopkinsville in 1817.

Henry was elected as a Jackson Republican to the Eighteenth Congress and reelected as a Jacksonian candidate to the Nineteenth Congress and served from March 4, 1823, until his death in Hopkinsville, Kentucky, August 25, 1826. His brother John Flournoy Henry took over his seat until the next election in 1827. He was interred in Pioneer Cemetery in Hopkinsville.

== See also ==
- List of members of the United States Congress who died in office (1790–1899)

U.S. House of Representatives
Preceded by District created	Member of the U.S. House of Representatives from Kentucky's 12th congressional district 1823–1826 (obsolete district)	Succeeded by John F. Henry
