= John Flournoy Henry =

American politician

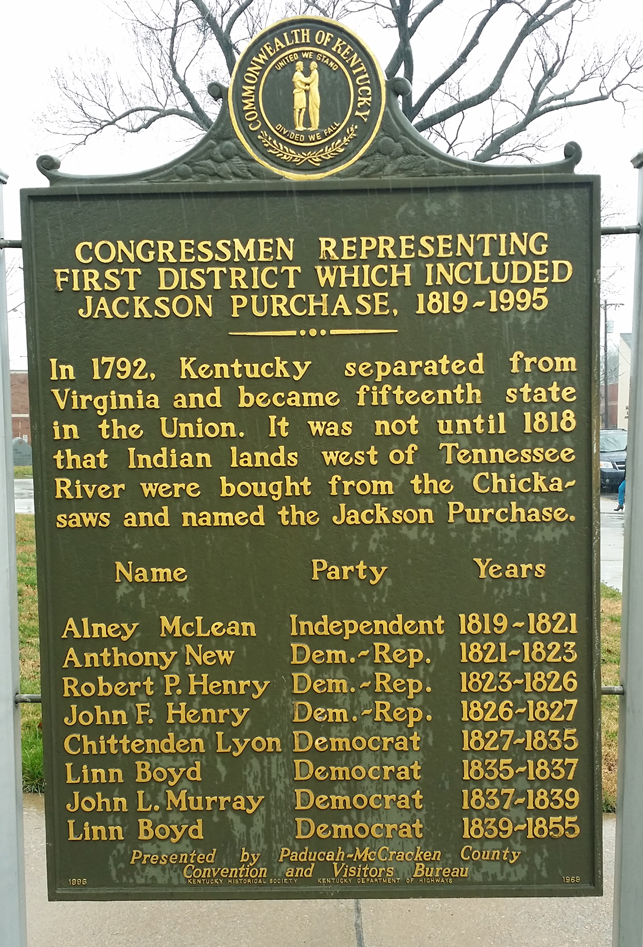
- Sign in front of the McCracken, Kentucky Courthouse (in Paducah, Kentucky) commemorating early members of the U.S. House of Representatives representing Jackson Purchase (U.S. historical region). The "First District" in the title actually changed over time. It refers to the Jackson Purchase, which was in the 5th district from 1819 to 1823, the 12th district until 1833, and then the 1st district until the end of the sign's lineage in 1855.

Member of the U.S. House of Representatives from Kentucky's 12th district
- In office December 11, 1826 – March 3, 1827
- Preceded by: Robert P. Henry
- Succeeded by: Chittenden Lyon

Personal details
- Born: January 17, 1793 Scott County, Kentucky, U.S.
- Died: November 12, 1873 (aged 80) Burlington, Iowa, U.S.
- Resting place: Aspen Grove Cemetery; Burlington, Iowa, U.S.
- Party: Jackson Republican
- Spouse(s): Mary Wilson Duke Henry; Lucy Stringer Ridgely Henry
- Children: 4
- Education: Georgetown Academy; College of Physicians and Surgeons

Military service
- Allegiance: United States
- Branch/service: Kentucky militia
- Years of service: 1812–1813
- Rank: Surgeon's mate
- Battles/wars: War of 1812

John Flournoy Henry (January 17, 1793 – November 12, 1873) was a U.S. representative from Kentucky.

Born at Scott County, Kentucky, Henry attended Georgetown Academy, Kentucky, and Jefferson Medical College, Philadelphia, Pennsylvania. He graduated from the College of Physicians and Surgeons in 1817. He served at Fort Meigs in 1813 as surgeon's mate of Kentucky troops. He engaged in agricultural pursuits and the practice of medicine. He owned slaves.

Henry was elected as an Adams candidate to the Nineteenth Congress to fill the vacancy caused by the death of his brother Robert P. Henry and served from December 11, 1826, to March 3, 1827. He was an unsuccessful candidate for reelection in 1827 to the Twentieth Congress. Professor in the Medical College of Ohio at Cincinnati in 1831. He moved to Bloomington, Illinois, in 1834 and to Burlington, Iowa, in 1845 and resumed the practice of medicine. He died in Burlington, Iowa, November 12, 1873. He was interred in Aspen Grove Cemetery.

U.S. House of Representatives
Preceded by Robert P. Henry	Member of the U.S. House of Representatives from Kentucky's 12th congressional district 1826–1827 (obsolete district)	Succeeded by Chittenden Lyon
