= William B. Conway =

American politician

William Conway

1st Acting Governor of Iowa Territory
- In office July 3, 1838 – August 15, 1838
- Succeeded by: Robert Lucas

1st Secretary of the Iowa Territory
- In office November 6, 1839 – August 15, 1838

Personal details
- Born: 1802 New Castle County, Delaware
- Died: November 6, 1839 Burlington, Iowa Territory

William Bernard Conway (1802–November 6, 1839) was an American politician and newspaperman who was the first secretary and first acting governor of Iowa Territory.

== Early life and newspaper career ==
Conway was born in New Castle County, Delaware. In Pittsburgh, Pennsylvania in 1830, he started publishing The American Manufacturer, a newspaper supportive of the Democratic Party. In 1833, he was admitted to the Pennsylvania bar and opened a law practice, which he relocated from Pittsburgh to Johnstown, Pennsylvania in 1835. While in Johnstown he founded a newspaper called the Mountaineer in early 1836; later in the same year he moved its publication to Ebensburg, Pennsylvania.

== Iowa territorial secretary ==
In 1838, he was appointed Secretary of the newly established Iowa Territory by President Martin Van Buren. Conway had never before held a political office; his appointment was said to have been in reward for his journalistic support of Van Buren and his predecessor Andrew Jackson. Secretary Conway served briefly as acting governor of the territory until the arrival of the official governor Robert Lucas. Lucas saw Conway's assumption of this role as illegitimate, and upon arrival reversed Conway's gubernatorial actions except for the judicial districting of the territory. Conway as secretary is credited with designing the Iowa territorial seal, which served as the model for the seal of the University of Iowa.

Conway died in Burlington, Iowa Territory while in office on November 6, 1839. His remains were brought to Davenport for interment.

== Literary activity ==
Conway was the writer of a poem, "Bribed Legislator", and a novel, The Cottage on the Cliff: A Tale of the Revolution.
