= 1842 Iowa Council election =

- 1842

All 13 seats in the Iowa Territory Council 7 seats needed for a majority
	Majority party	Minority party
Leader	Thomas Cox (Note: Councilor Cox of Jackson County.)	John D. Elbert (Note: Councilor Elbert of Van Buren County was chosen to be the President of the fifth Iowa Territory Council.)
Party	Democratic	Whig
Leader's seat	10th-Jackson County	2nd-Van Buren County
Last election	8	5
Seats after	7	6
Seat change	▼1	▲1
- Democratic hold Whig hold Democratic gain Whig gain
President of the Iowa Territory Council before election
Jonathan W. Parker
Democratic
Elected President of the Iowa Territory Council
John D. Elbert
Whig

In the 1842 Iowa Territory Council elections, electors selected councilors to serve in the fifth Iowa Territory Council. All 13 members of the Territory Council were elected. (Note: At the time, the Iowa Territory Council had several multi-member districts.) Councilors served one-year terms.

The Iowa Territory existed from July 4, 1838, until December 28, 1846, when Iowa was admitted to the Union as a state. At the time, the Iowa Territory had a Legislative Assembly consisting of an upper chamber (i.e., the Territory Council) and a lower chamber (i.e., the Territory House).

Following the previous election in 1841, Democrats held a majority with eight seats to Whigs' five seats.

To claim a majority of seats, the Whigs needed to net two seats from Democrats.

Democrats maintained a majority of seats in the Iowa Territory Council following the 1842 general election with the balance of power shifting to Democrats holding seven seats and Whigs having six seats (a net gain of 1 seat for Whigs). Whig Councilor John D. Elbert was chosen as the President of the fifth Territory Council to succeed Democratic Councilor Jonathan W. Parker in that leadership position.

== Summary of Results ==
Iowa Territory Council District	Incumbent	Party	Elected Councilor	Party	Outcome
1st (Note: The 1st was a 2-member district.)	Jesse B. Browne	Whig	Robert M. G. Patterson	Whig	Whig Hold
1st	Edward Johnstone	Dem	William Patterson	Dem	Dem Hold
2nd (Note: The 2nd was a 2-member district.)	Gideon Smith Bailey	Dem	John D. Elbert	Whig	Whig Gain
2nd	James Hall	Dem	James H. Jenkins	Dem	Dem Hold
3rd (Note: The 3rd was a 1-member district.)	Shepherd Leffler	Dem	Shepherd Leffler	Dem	Dem Hold
4th (Note: The 4th was a 1-member district.)	William Henson Wallace	Whig	William Henson Wallace	Whig	Whig Hold
5th (Note: The 5th was a 1-member district.)	William Greyer Coop	Dem	Joseph B. Teas	Dem	Dem Hold
6th (Note: The 6th was a 1-member district.)	Francis Springer	Whig	Francis Springer	Whig	Whig Hold
7th (Note: The 7th was a 1-member district.)	Serranus Clinton Hastings	Dem	Pleasant Harris	Dem	Dem Hold
8th (Note: The 8th was a 1-member district.)	George Greene	Dem	John Parsons Cook	Whig	Whig Gain
9th (Note: The 9th was a 1-member district.)	Jonathan W. Parker	Dem	Robert Christie	Whig	Whig Gain
10th (Note: The 10th was a 2-member district.)	Mortimer Phillips Bainbridge	Whig	Thomas Cox	Dem	Dem Gain
10th	Joseph S. Kirkpatrick	Whig	Francis Gehon	Dem	Dem Gain

== Detailed Results ==
- NOTE: The Iowa General Assembly does not contain detailed vote totals for Territory Council elections in 1842.

== See also ==
- Elections in Iowa
