= 1844 Iowa Council election =

- 1844

All 13 seats in the Iowa Territory Council 7 seats needed for a majority
	Majority party	Minority party
Party	Democratic	Whig
Last election	7	6
Seats before	6 (Note: Councilor Cox of Jackson County died during the sixth session of the Iowa Territory Council on November 9, 1844 from pneumonia, causing a vacancy in a Democratic seat.)	6
Seats after	11	2
Seat change	▲5	▼4
President of the Iowa Territory Council before election
Thomas Cox
Democratic
Elected President of the Iowa Territory Council
Serranus Clinton Hastings
Democratic

In the 1844 Iowa Territory Council elections, electors selected councilors to serve in the seventh Iowa Territory Council. All 13 members of the Territory Council were elected. (Note: At the time, the Iowa Territory Council had several multi-member districts.) Councilors served one-year terms.

The Iowa Territory existed from July 4, 1838, until December 28, 1846, when Iowa was admitted to the Union as a state. At the time, the Iowa Territory had a Legislative Assembly consisting of an upper chamber (i.e., the Territory Council) and a lower chamber (i.e., the Territory House of Representatives).

Following the previous election in 1843, Democrats held a majority with seven seats to Whigs' six seats. During the sixth session of the Territory Council, Councilor Cox died, causing a vacancy in a Democratic Party seat. Therefore, on election day in 1844, the Democrats and Whigs both had six seats each.

To claim a majority of seats, the Whigs needed to net one seat from Democrats.

Democrats maintained a majority of seats in the Iowa Territory Council following the 1844 general election with the balance of power shifting to Democrats holding 11 seats and Whigs having two seats (a net gain of 5 seat for Democrats, including regaining the vacant seat). Democratic Councilor Serranus Clinton Hastings was chosen as the President of the seventh Territory Council to succeed the deceased Democratic Councilor Thomas Cox in that leadership position.

== Summary of Results ==
Iowa Territory Council District	Incumbent	Party	Elected Councilor	Party	Outcome
1st (Note: The 1st was a 2-member district.)	Robert M. G. Patterson	Whig	James Brierly	Dem	Dem Gain
1st	William Patterson	Dem	John Thompson	Dem	Dem Hold
2nd (Note: The 2nd was a 2-member district.)	John D. Elbert	Whig	Paul Brattain	Dem	Dem Gain
2nd	James H. Jenkins	Dem	Henry M. Shelby	Dem	Dem Hold
3rd (Note: The 3rd was a 1-member district.)	Shepherd Leffler	Dem	Shepherd Leffler	Dem	Dem Hold
4th (Note: The 4th was a 1-member district.)	William Henson Wallace	Whig	John Stephenson	Whig	Whig Hold
5th (Note: The 5th was a 1-member district.)	Joseph B. Teas	Dem	William Greyer Coop	Dem	Dem Hold
6th (Note: The 6th was a 1-member district.)	Francis Springer	Whig	Enoch Ross	Whig	Whig Hold
7th (Note: The 7th was a 1-member district.)	Pleasant Harris	Dem	Serranus Clinton Hastings	Dem	Dem Hold
8th (Note: The 8th was a 1-member district.)	John Parsons Cook	Whig	William Abbe	Dem	Dem Gain
9th (Note: The 9th was a 1-member district.)	Robert Christie	Whig	Laurel Summers	Dem	Dem Gain
10th (Note: The 10th was a 2-member district.)	Thomas Cox	Dem	Philip Burr Bradley	Dem	Dem Gain
10th	Vacancy after Cox's death		Philip Burr Bradley	Dem	Dem Gain
10th	Francis Gehon	Dem	Stephen Hempstead	Dem	Dem Hold

== Detailed Results ==
- NOTE: The Iowa General Assembly does not contain detailed vote totals for Territory Council elections in 1844.

== See also ==
- Elections in Iowa
