= 1840 Iowa Council election =

- 1840

All 13 seats in the Iowa Territory Council 7 seats needed for a majority
	Majority party	Minority party
Leader	Jonathan W. Parker (Note: Councilor Parker of Scott County.)	Mortimer Phillips Bainbridge (Note: Councilor Bainbridge of Dubuque County was chosen to be the President of the third Iowa Territory Council.)
Party	Democratic	Whig
Leader's seat	9th-Scott County	10th-Dubuque County
Last election	7	6
Seats after	7	6
Seat change	Steady	Steady
- Democratic hold Whig hold Democratic gain Whig gain
President of the Iowa Territory Council before election
Stephen Hempstead
Democratic
Elected President of the Iowa Territory Council
Mortimer Phillips Bainbridge
Whig

In the 1840 Iowa Territory Council elections, electors selected councilors to serve in the third Iowa Territory Council. All 13 members of the Territory Council were elected. (Note: At the time, the Council had several multi-member districts.) Councilors served one-year terms.

The Iowa Territory existed from July 4, 1838, until December 28, 1846, when Iowa was admitted to the Union as a state. At the time, the Iowa Territory had a Legislative Assembly consisting of an upper chamber (i.e., the Territory Council) and a lower chamber (i.e., the Territory House).

Following the previous election in 1839, Democrats held a majority with seven seats to Whigs' six seats.

To claim a majority of seats, the Whigs needed to net one seat from the Democrats.

The Democrats maintained a majority of seats in the Council following the 1840 general election with the balance of power remaining unchanged with the Democrats holding seven seats and the Whigs having six seats. Whig Councilor Mortimer Phillips Bainbridge was chosen as the President of the third Territory Council to succeed Democratic Councilor Stephen P. Hempstead in that leadership position.

== Summary of Results ==
Iowa Territory Council District	Incumbent	Party	Elected Councilor	Party	Outcome
1st (Note: The 1st transitioned from a 3- to 2-member district.)	George Hepner	Dem	Jesse B. Browne (Note: Councilor Browne was an incumbent Councilor redistricted from district 2 to 1.)	Whig	Whig Gain
1st	Arthur Inghram	Dem	Edward Johnstone	Dem	Dem Hold
1st	Robert Ralston	Dem	Obsolete subdistrict		
2nd (Note: The 2nd transitioned from a 1- to 2-member district.)	Jesse B. Browne	Whig	Gideon Smith Bailey	Dem	Dem Gain
2nd	Newly created subdistrict		James Hall	Dem	Dem Gain
3rd (Note: The 3rd transitioned from a 2- to 1-member district.)	Lawson B. Hughes	Whig	Joseph C. Hawkins	Whig	Whig Hold
3rd	Jesse D. Payne	Dem	Obsolete subdistrict		
4th (Note: The 4th transitioned from a 2- to 1-member district.)	Isham Keith	Whig	William Henson Wallace	Whig	Whig Hold
4th	E. A. M. Swazy	Dem	Obsolete subdistrict		
5th (Note: The 5th was a 1-member district.)	James M. Clark	Whig	William Greyer Coop	Dem	Dem Gain
6th (Note: The 6th was a 1-member district.)	Charles Whittlesey	Whig	Francis Springer	Whig	Whig Hold
7th (Note: The 7th was a 1-member district.)	Jonathan W. Parker (Note: Councilor Parker was an incumbent Councilor redistricted from district 7 to 9.)	Dem	Serranus Clinton Hastings	Dem	Dem Hold
8th (Note: The 8th transitioned from a 2- to 1-member district.)	Stephen Hempstead	Dem	George Greene	Dem	Dem Hold
8th	Warner Lewis	Dem	Obsolete subdistrict		
9th (Note: The 9th was a newly created 1-member district.)	Newly created subdistrict		Jonathan W. Parker	Dem	Dem Gain
10th (Note: The 10th was a newly created 2-member district.)	Newly created subdistrict		Mortimer Phillips Bainbridge	Whig	Whig Gain
10th	Newly created subdistrict		Joseph S. Kirkpatrick	Whig	Whig Gain

== Detailed Results ==
- NOTE: The Iowa General Assembly does not contain detailed vote totals for Territory Council elections in 1840.

== See also ==
- Elections in Iowa
