= 1841 Iowa Council election =

- 1841

All 13 seats in the Iowa Territory Council 7 seats needed for a majority
	Majority party	Minority party
Leader	Jonathan W. Parker (Note: Councilor Parker of Scott County was chosen to be the President of the fourth Iowa Territory Council.)	Mortimer Phillips Bainbridge (Note: Councilor Bainbridge of Dubuque County.)
Party	Democratic	Whig
Leader's seat	9th-Scott County	10th-Dubuque County
Last election	7	6
Seats after	8	5
Seat change	▲1	▼1
- Democratic hold Whig hold Democratic gain
President of the Iowa Territory Council before election
Mortimer Phillips Bainbridge
Whig
Elected President of the Iowa Territory Council
Jonathan W. Parker
Democratic

In the 1841 Iowa Territory Council elections, electors selected councilors to serve in the fourth Iowa Territory Council. All 13 members of the Territory Council were elected. (Note: At the time, the Iowa Territory Council had several multi-member districts.) Councilors served one-year terms.

The Iowa Territory existed from July 4, 1838, until December 28, 1846, when Iowa was admitted to the Union as a state. At the time, the Iowa Territory had a Legislative Assembly consisting of an upper chamber (i.e., the Territory Council) and a lower chamber (i.e., the Territory House).

Following the previous election in 1840, Democrats held a majority with seven seats to Whigs' six seats.

To claim a majority of seats, the Whigs needed to net one seat from the Democrats.

The Democrats maintained a majority of seats in the Council following the 1841 general election with the balance of power shifting to Democrats holding eight seats and Whigs having five seats (a net gain of 1 seat for Democrats). Democratic Councilor Jonathan W. Parker was chosen as the President of the fourth Territory Council to succeed Whig Councilor Mortimer Phillips Bainbridge in that leadership position.

== Summary of Results ==
Iowa Territory Council District	Incumbent	Party	Elected Councilor	Party	Outcome
1st (Note: The 1st was a 2-member district.)	Jesse B. Browne	Whig	Jesse B. Browne	Whig	Whig Hold
1st	Edward Johnstone	Dem	Edward Johnstone	Dem	Dem Hold
2nd (Note: The 2nd was a 2-member district.)	Gideon Smith Bailey	Dem	Gideon Smith Bailey	Dem	Dem Hold
2nd	James Hall	Dem	James Hall	Dem	Dem Hold
3rd (Note: The 3rd was a 1-member district.)	Joseph C. Hawkins	Whig	Shepherd Leffler	Dem	Dem Gain
4th (Note: The 4th was a 1-member district.)	William Henson Wallace	Whig	William Henson Wallace	Whig	Whig Hold
5th (Note: The 5th was a 1-member district.)	William Greyer Coop	Dem	William Greyer Coop	Dem	Dem Hold
6th (Note: The 6th was a 1-member district.)	Francis Springer	Whig	Francis Springer	Whig	Whig Hold
7th (Note: The 7th was a 1-member district.)	Serranus Clinton Hastings	Dem	Serranus Clinton Hastings	Dem	Dem Hold
8th (Note: The 8th was a 1-member district.)	George Greene	Dem	George Greene	Dem	Dem Hold
9th (Note: The 9th was a 1-member district.)	Jonathan W. Parker	Dem	Jonathan W. Parker	Dem	Dem Hold
10th (Note: The 10th was a 2-member district.)	Mortimer Phillips Bainbridge	Whig	Mortimer Phillips Bainbridge	Whig	Whig Hold
10th	Joseph S. Kirkpatrick	Whig	Joseph S. Kirkpatrick	Whig	Whig Hold

== Detailed Results ==
- NOTE: The Iowa General Assembly does not contain detailed vote totals for Territory Council elections in 1841.

== See also ==
- Elections in Iowa
