= 1846 Iowa Senate election =

- 1846

All 19 seats in the Iowa State Senate 10 seats needed for a majority
	Majority party	Minority party
Party	Democratic	Whig
Last election	11	2
Seats after	11 (Note: The Iowa Territory Council had 13 seats; however, the newly created Iowa Senate was expanded to 19 seats.)	8
Seat change	Steady	▲6
President of the Chamber before election
Stephen Hempstead (Note: Councilor Hempstead of Dubuque County was chosen to be the President of the eighth and final Iowa Territory Council.)
Democratic
Elected President of the Chamber
Thomas Baker (Note: Senator Thomas Baker of Polk County was chosen to be the first President of the Iowa Senate. He served during the first Iowa General Assembly.) & Thomas Hughes (Note: Senator Thomas Hughes of Johnson County was chosen to be the second President of the Iowa Senate. He served during the first Iowa General Assembly, succeeding Senator Thomas Baker in that leadership position.)
Democratic

In the 1846 Iowa State Senate elections, Iowa voters elected state senators to serve in the first Iowa General Assembly. Elections were held for all 19 members of the State Senate. In the newly created Senate, members were to serve four-year terms. Members of the first General Assembly were classified into two groups. Nine of the newly elected senators would serve full four-year terms, while 10 drew short terms of two years and were up for re-election in 1848. This classification process began the rotation system whereby half the members of the Senate are elected biennially for full four-year terms.

This was the first general election following Iowa's admission to the Union. (Note: On December 28, 1846, Iowa was granted statehood as the twenty-ninth state in the Union. The 1845 Iowa Territory Council general election was the last held for seats in the territorial government. Starting in 1846, the legislative branch of the new state of Iowa would be the Iowa General Assembly, organized with the Iowa Senate as the upper chamber and Iowa House of Representatives as the lower chamber. The Territory Council with its councilors served as the precursor of the Iowa State Senate and its senators. Therefore, the 1846 Iowa Senate election determined the Senators to serve in the first Iowa General Assembly.) Prior to statehood, the Iowa Territory had a Legislative Assembly consisting of an upper chamber (i.e., the Territory Council) and a lower chamber (i.e., the Territory House). (Note: At the time, the Iowa Territory Council and the Iowa Senate both had several multi-member districts.) Therefore, the Territory Council was the predecessor of the Iowa Senate, which became the upper chamber in the new Iowa General Assembly.

In the previous election in 1845, the members of the eighth and final Territory Council were chosen. Democrats held a majority of seats with 11 to Whigs' two seats in the final Territory Council. The newly created Iowa Senate was expanded to nineteen members and districts were redrawn in advance of the election.

To claim a majority of seats, the Whigs needed to net eight seats.

The general election took place in 1846.

Democrats maintained a majority of seats. Following the 1846 general election, Democrats held 11 seats in the Iowa Senate while Whigs held eight seats (a net gain of 6 seats for Whigs). Democratic Councilor Stephen Hempstead was the President of the eighth & final Territory Council. Democratic Senator Thomas Baker was chosen as the first President of the Iowa Senate. During the first General Assembly, Democratic Senator Thomas Hughes succeeded Senator Baker as the second President of the Iowa Senate.

== Summary of Results ==
Iowa Territory Council District	Counties in Council District	Incumbent Councilor	Party	Iowa Senate District	Counties in Senate District	Elected Senator	Party	Outcome
1st (Note: The Iowa Territory Council 1st district was a 2-member district.)	Lee	James Brierly	Dem	1st (Note: The Iowa Senate 1st district was a 2-member district.)	Lee	Jacob Huner	Dem	Dem Hold
1st	Lee	John Thompson	Dem	1st	Lee	James Sprott	Whig	Whig Gain
2nd (Note: The Iowa Territory Council 2nd district was a 2-member district.)	Van Buren, Davis, Appanoose	Paul Brattain	Dem	2nd (Note: The Iowa Senate 2nd district was a 2-member district.)	Van Buren	John Fletcher Sanford	Whig	Whig Gain
2nd	Van Buren, Davis, Appanoose	Henry M. Shelby	Dem	2nd	Van Buren	John McCormick Whitaker	Dem	Dem Hold
3rd (Note: The Iowa Territory Council 3rd district was a 1-member district.)	Des Moines	Shepherd Leffler	Dem	3rd (Note: The Iowa Senate 3rd district was a 1-member district.)	Davis, Appanoose	John Jackson Selman	Dem	Dem Hold
4th (Note: The Iowa Territory Council 4th district was a 1-member district.)	Henry	John Stephenson	Whig	4th (Note: The Iowa Senate 4th district was a 1-member district.)	Monroe, Wapello	James Davis	Whig	Whig Hold
5th (Note: The Iowa Territory Council 5th district was a 1-member district.)	Monroe, Wapello, Jefferson	William Greyer Coop	Dem	5th (Note: The Iowa Senate 5th district was a 1-member district.)	Marion, Jasper, Polk, Dallas	Thomas Baker	Dem	Dem Hold
6th (Note: The Iowa Territory Council 6th district was a 1-member district.)	Louisa, Washington, Keokuk, Mahaska, Marion, Poweshiek	Enoch Ross	Whig	6th (Note: The Iowa Senate 6th district was a 2-member district.)	Des Moines	Milton D. Browning	Whig	Whig Hold
6th	Louisa, Washington, Keokuk, Mahaska, Marion, Poweshiek	Newly created subdistrict		6th	Des Moines	Samuel Fullenwider	Whig	Whig Gain
7th (Note: The Iowa Territory Council 7th district was a 1-member district.)	Iowa, Johnson, Muscatine	Serranus Clinton Hastings	Dem	7th (Note: The Iowa Senate 7th district was a 1-member district.)	Henry	Evan Jay	Whig	Whig Gain
8th (Note: The Iowa Territory Council 8th district was a 1-member district.)	Cedar, Jones, Linn, Benton, Tama	William Abbe	Dem	8th (Note: The Iowa Senate 8th district was a 1-member district.)	Jefferson	Robert Brown (Note: On January 2, 1848, Senator Brown resigned, causing a vacancy. That vacant seat was filled by Senator John Howell.)	Dem	Dem Hold
8th	Cedar, Jones, Linn, Benton, Tama	William Abbe	Dem	8th	Jefferson	John Howell (Note: On January 2, 1848, Senator Brown resigned, causing a vacancy. That vacant seat was filled by Senator John Howell.)	Dem	Dem Hold
9th (Note: The Iowa Territory Council 9th district was a 1-member district.)	Scott, Clinton, Linn	Laurel Summers	Dem	9th (Note: The Iowa Senate 9th district was a 1-member district.)	Louisa, Washington	Francis Springer	Whig	Whig Gain
10th (Note: The Iowa Territory Council 10th district was a 2-member district.)	Jackson, Dubuque, Delaware, Buchanan, Black Hawk, Clayton, Fayette	Philip Burr Bradley	Dem	10th (Note: The Iowa Senate 10th district was a 1-member district.)	Keokuk, Mahaska	Richard Randolph Harbour	Dem	Dem Hold
10th	Jackson, Dubuque, Delaware, Buchanan, Black Hawk, Clayton, Fayette	Stephen Hempstead	Dem	10th	Keokuk, Mahaska	Richard Randolph Harbour	Dem	Dem Hold
Newly created district				11th (Note: The Iowa Senate 11th district was a newly created 1-member district.)	Iowa, Johnson, Muscatine	Thomas Hughes	Dem	Dem Gain
Newly created district				12th (Note: The Iowa Senate 12th district was a newly created 1-member district.)	Scott, Clinton	Loring Wheeler	Whig	Whig Gain
Newly created district				13th (Note: The Iowa Senate 13th district was a newly created 1-member district.)	Cedar, Linn, Benton	Samuel Augustus Bissell	Dem	Dem Gain
Newly created district				14th (Note: The Iowa Senate 14th district was a newly created 1-member district.)	Jackson, Jones	Philip Burr Bradley (Note: Senator Bradley was an incumbent councilor who had served representing the 10th district during the final Iowa Territory Council before being elected to the first session of the Iowa Senate.)	Dem	Dem Gain
Newly created district				15th (Note: The Iowa Senate 15th district was a newly created 2-member district.)	Dubuque, Delaware, Buchanan, Black Hawk, Clayton, Fayette	Thomas Hart Benton	Dem	Dem Gain
Newly created district				15th	Dubuque, Delaware, Buchanan, Black Hawk, Clayton, Fayette	Theophilus Crawford	Dem	Dem Gain

== Detailed Results ==
- NOTE: The Iowa General Assembly does not contain detailed vote totals for Iowa State Senate elections in 1846.

== See also ==
- Elections in Iowa
