= 1845 Iowa Council election =

- 1845

All 13 seats in the Iowa Territory Council 7 seats needed for a majority
	Majority party	Minority party
Party	Democratic	Whig
Last election	11	2
Seats after	11	2
Seat change	Steady	Steady
President of the Iowa Territory Council before election
Serranus Clinton Hastings
Democratic
Elected President of the Iowa Territory Council
Stephen Hempstead
Democratic

In the 1845 Iowa Territory Council elections, electors selected councilors to serve in the eighth and final Iowa Territory Council before Iowa attained statehood in 1846. (Note: On December 28, 1846, Iowa was granted statehood as the twenty-ninth state in the Union. The 1845 Iowa Territory Council general election was the last held for seats in the Territorial Council. Starting in 1846, the legislative branch of the new state of Iowa would be the Iowa General Assembly, organized with the Iowa Senate as the upper chamber and Iowa House of Representatives as the lower chamber. The Territory Council with its councilors served as the precursor of the Iowa State Senate and its senators. Therefore, the 1846 Iowa Senate election determined the Senators to serve in the first Iowa General Assembly.) All 13 members of the Territory Council were elected, (Note: At the time, the Iowa Territory Council had several multi-member districts.) and councilors served until the organization of the Iowa General Assembly in 1846 as the legislative branch of the new state of Iowa.

The Iowa Territory existed from July 4, 1838, until December 28, 1846, when Iowa was admitted to the Union as a state. At that time, the Iowa Territory had a Legislative Assembly consisting of an upper chamber (i.e., the Territory Council) and a lower chamber (i.e., the Territory House of Representatives). Since lowa attained statehood in 1846, the General Assembly has served as the legislative branch of Iowa. The Territory Council was the predecessor to the Iowa State Senate, the upper chamber of the Iowa state legislature.

Following the previous election in 1844, the Democrats held a majority with 11 seats compared to the Whigs' two seats.

To claim a majority of seats, the Whigs needed to net five seats from Democrats.

After the 1845 general election, the Democrats maintained a majority of seats in the Council, with the balance of power unchanged, with Democrats holding 11 seats and Whigs having two seats. Democratic Councilor Stephen P. Hempstead was elected as the President of the eighth Territory Council to succeed Democratic Councilor Serranus Clinton Hastings in that leadership position.

== Summary of results ==
Iowa Territory Council District	Incumbent	Party	Elected Councilor	Party	Outcome
1st (Note: The 1st was a 2-member district.)	James Brierly	Dem	James Brierly	Dem	Dem Hold
1st	John Thompson	Dem	John Thompson	Dem	Dem Hold
2nd (Note: The 2nd was a 2-member district.)	Paul Brattain	Dem	Paul Brattain	Dem	Dem Hold
2nd	Henry M. Shelby	Dem	Henry M. Shelby	Dem	Dem Hold
3rd (Note: The 3rd was a 1-member district.)	Shepherd Leffler	Dem	Shepherd Leffler	Dem	Dem Hold
4th (Note: The 4th was a 1-member district.)	John Stephenson	Whig	John Stephenson	Whig	Whig Hold
5th (Note: The 5th was a 1-member district.)	William Greyer Coop	Dem	William Greyer Coop	Dem	Dem Hold
6th (Note: The 6th was a 1-member district.)	Enoch Ross	Whig	Enoch Ross	Whig	Whig Hold
7th (Note: The 7th was a 1-member district.)	Serranus Clinton Hastings	Dem	Serranus Clinton Hastings	Dem	Dem Hold
8th (Note: The 8th was a 1-member district.)	William Abbe	Dem	William Abbe	Dem	Dem Hold
9th (Note: The 9th was a 1-member district.)	Laurel Summers	Dem	Laurel Summers	Dem	Dem Hold
10th (Note: The 10th was a 2-member district.)	Philip Burr Bradley	Dem	Philip Burr Bradley	Dem	Dem Hold
10th	Stephen Hempstead	Dem	Stephen Hempstead	Dem	Dem Hold

== Detailed results ==
- NOTE: The Iowa General Assembly does not contain detailed vote totals for Territory Council elections in 1845.

== See also ==
- Elections in Iowa
