= 1843 Iowa Council election =

- 1843

All 13 seats in the Iowa Territory Council 7 seats needed for a majority
	Majority party	Minority party
Leader	Thomas Cox (Note: Councilor Cox of Jackson County was chosen to be President of the sixth Iowa Territory Council. He died during the session on November 9, 1844 from pneumonia.)	John D. Elbert (Note: Councilor Elbert of Van Buren County.)
Party	Democratic	Whig
Leader's seat	10th-Jackson County	2nd-Van Buren County
Last election	7	6
Seats after	6	6
Seat change	▼1 (Note: Councilor Cox of Jackson County died during the sixth session of the Iowa Territory Council on November 9, 1844, from pneumonia.)	Steady
- Democratic hold Whig hold
President of the Iowa Territory Council before election
John D. Elbert
Whig
Elected President of the Iowa Territory Council
Thomas Cox
Democratic

In the 1843 Iowa Territory Council elections, electors selected councilors to serve in the sixth Iowa Territory Council. All 13 members of the Territory Council were elected. (Note: At the time, the Iowa Territory Council had several multi-member districts.) Councilors served one-year terms.

The Iowa Territory existed from July 4, 1838, until December 28, 1846, when Iowa was admitted to the Union as a state. At the time, the Iowa Territory had a Legislative Assembly consisting of an upper chamber (i.e., the Territory Council) and a lower chamber (i.e., the Territory House).

Following the previous election in 1842, Democrats held a majority with seven seats to Whigs' six seats.

To claim a majority of seats, the Whigs needed to net one seat from Democrats.

Democrats maintained a majority of seats in the Iowa Territory Council following the 1843 general election with the balance of power remaining unchanged with Democrats holding seven seats and Whigs having six seats. Democratic Councilor Thomas Cox was chosen as the President of the sixth Territory Council to succeed Whig Councilor John D. Elbert in that leadership position.

However, during the session, Democratic Councilor Thomas Cox died on November 9, 1844, causing a vacancy. Following Cox's death, Democrats and Whigs were tied with six seats each.

== Summary of Results ==
Iowa Territory Council District	Incumbent	Party	Elected Councilor	Party	Outcome
1st (Note: The 1st was a 2-member district.)	Robert M. G. Patterson	Whig	Robert M. G. Patterson	Whig	Whig Hold
1st	William Patterson	Dem	William Patterson	Dem	Dem Hold
2nd (Note: The 2nd was a 2-member district.)	John D. Elbert	Whig	John D. Elbert	Whig	Whig Hold
2nd	James H. Jenkins	Dem	James H. Jenkins	Dem	Dem Hold
3rd (Note: The 3rd was a 1-member district.)	Shepherd Leffler	Dem	Shepherd Leffler	Dem	Dem Hold
4th (Note: The 4th was a 1-member district.)	William Henson Wallace	Whig	William Henson Wallace	Whig	Whig Hold
5th (Note: The 5th was a 1-member district.)	Joseph B. Teas	Dem	Joseph B. Teas	Dem	Dem Hold
6th (Note: The 6th was a 1-member district.)	Francis Springer	Whig	Francis Springer	Whig	Whig Hold
7th (Note: The 7th was a 1-member district.)	Pleasant Harris	Dem	Pleasant Harris	Dem	Dem Hold
8th (Note: The 8th was a 1-member district.)	John Parsons Cook	Whig	John Parsons Cook	Whig	Whig Hold
9th (Note: The 9th was a 1-member district.)	Robert Christie	Whig	Robert Christie	Whig	Whig Hold
10th (Note: The 10th was a 2-member district.)	Thomas Cox	Dem	Thomas Cox	Dem	Dem Hold
10th	Thomas Cox	Dem	Vacancy after Cox's death		
10th	Francis Gehon	Dem	Francis Gehon	Dem	Dem Hold

== Detailed Results ==
- NOTE: The Iowa General Assembly does not contain detailed vote totals for Territory Council elections in 1843.

== See also ==
- Elections in Iowa
