= 1839 Iowa Council election =

- 1839

All 13 seats in the Iowa Territory Council 7 seats needed for a majority
	Majority party	Minority party
Leader	Stephen Hempstead (Note: Councilor Hempstead of Dubuque County was chosen to be the President of the second Iowa Territory Council.)	Jesse B. Browne
Party	Democratic	Whig
Leader's seat	8th-Dubuque County	2nd-Lee County
Last election	7	6
Seats after	7	6
Seat change	Steady	Steady
President of the Iowa Territory Council before election
Jesse B. Browne
Whig
Elected President of the Iowa Territory Council
Stephen Hempstead
Democratic

In the 1839 Iowa Territory Council elections, electors selected councilors to serve in the second Iowa Territory Council. All 13 members of the Territory Council were elected. (Note: At the time, the Council had several multi-member districts.) Councilors served one-year terms.

The Iowa Territory existed from July 4, 1838, until December 28, 1846, when Iowa was admitted to the Union as a state. At the time, the Iowa Territory had a Legislative Assembly consisting of an upper chamber (i.e., the Territory Council) and a lower chamber (i.e., the Territory House of Representatives).

Following the organization of the first Territory Council in 1838, Democrats held a majority with seven seats to Whigs' six seats.

To claim a majority of seats, the Whigs needed to net one seat from the Democrats.

The Democrats maintained a majority of seats in the Council following the 1839 general election with the balance of power remaining unchanged with the Democrats holding seven seats and the Whigs having six seats. Democratic Councilor Stephen P. Hempstead was chosen as the President of the second Territory Council to succeed Whig Councilor Jesse B. Browne in that leadership position.

== Summary of Results ==
Iowa Territory Council District	Incumbent	Party	Elected Councilor	Party	Outcome
1st (Note: The 1st was a 3-member district.)	George Hepner	Dem	George Hepner (Note: Councilor Hepner resided in Des Moines County during the second Iowa Territory Council.)	Dem	Dem Hold
1st	Arthur Inghram	Dem	Arthur Inghram (Note: Councilor Inghram resided in Des Moines County during the second Iowa Territory Council.)	Dem	Dem Hold
1st	Robert Ralston	Dem	Robert Ralston (Note: Councilor Ralston resided in Des Moines County during the second Iowa Territory Council.)	Dem	Dem Hold
2nd (Note: The 2nd was a 1-member district.)	Jesse B. Browne	Whig	Jesse B. Browne (Note: Councilor Browne resided in Lee County during the second Iowa Territory Council.)	Whig	Whig Hold
3rd (Note: The 3rd was a 2-member district.)	Lawson B. Hughes	Whig	Lawson B. Hughes (Note: Councilor Hughes resided in Henry County during the second Iowa Territory Council.)	Whig	Whig Hold
3rd	Jesse D. Payne	Whig	Jesse D. Payne (Note: Councilor Payne resided in Henry County during the second Iowa Territory Council.)	Whig	Whig Hold
4th (Note: The 4th was a 2-member district.)	E. A. M. Swazy	Dem	E. A. M. Swazy (Note: Councilor Swazy resided in Van Buren County during the second Iowa Territory Council.)	Dem	Dem Hold
4th	Isham Keith	Whig	Isham Keith (Note: Councilor Keith resided in Van Buren County during the second Iowa Territory Council.)	Whig	Whig Hold
5th (Note: The 5th was a 1-member district.)	James M. Clark	Whig	James M. Clark (Note: Councilor Clark resided in Louisa County during the second Iowa Territory Council.)	Whig	Whig Hold
6th (Note: The 6th was a 1-member district.)	Charles Whittlesey	Whig	Charles Whittlesey (Note: Councilor Whittlesey resided in Cedar County during the second Iowa Territory Council.)	Whig	Whig Hold
7th (Note: The 7th was a 1-member district.)	Jonathan W. Parker	Dem	Jonathan W. Parker (Note: Councilor Parker resided in Scott County during the second Iowa Territory Council.)	Dem	Dem Hold
8th (Note: The 8th was a 2-member district.)	Stephen Hempstead	Dem	Stephen Hempstead	Dem	Dem Hold
8th	Warner Lewis	Dem	Warner Lewis (Note: Councilor Lewis resided in Dubuque County during the second Iowa Territory Council.)	Dem	Dem Hold

== Detailed Results ==
- NOTE: The Iowa General Assembly does not contain detailed vote totals for Territory Council elections in 1839.

== See also ==
- Elections in Iowa
