= 1838 Iowa Council election =

- 1838

All 13 seats in the Iowa Territory Council 7 seats needed for a majority
	Majority party	Minority party
Leader	Stephen Hempstead	Jesse B. Browne (Note: Councilor Browne of Lee County was chosen to be the President of the first Iowa Territory Council.)
Party	Democratic	Whig
Leader's seat	8th-Dubuque County	2nd-Lee County
Seats after	7	6
Elected President of the Iowa Territory Council
Jesse B. Browne
Whig

In the 1838 Iowa Territory Council elections, electors selected councilors to serve in the first Iowa Territory Council. All 13 members of the Territory Council were elected. (Note: At the time, the Council had several multi-member districts.) Councilors served one-year terms.

The Iowa Territory existed from July 4, 1838, until December 28, 1846, when Iowa was admitted to the Union as a state. At the time, the Iowa Territory had a Legislative Assembly consisting of an upper chamber (i.e., the Territory Council) and a lower chamber (i.e., the Territory House of Representatives).

Following the organization of the first Territory Council, Whig Councilor Jesse B. Browne of Lee County was chosen as the President of the Territory Council. Democrats held a majority of seats in the first Iowa Territory Council following the 1838 general election with seven seats to Whigs' six seats.

== Summary of Results ==
Iowa Territory Council District	Elected Councilor	Party
1st (Note: The 1st was a 3-member district.)	George Hepner	Dem
1st	Arthur Inghram	Dem
1st	Robert Ralston	Dem
2nd (Note: The 2nd was a 1-member district.)	Jesse B. Browne	Whig
3rd (Note: The 3rd was a 2-member district.)	Lawson B. Hughes	Whig
3rd	Jesse D. Payne	Whig
4th (Note: The 4th was a 2-member district.)	E. A. M. Swazy	Dem
4th	Isham Keith	Whig
5th (Note: The 5th was a 1-member district.)	James M. Clark	Whig
6th (Note: The 6th was a 1-member district.)	Charles Whittlesey	Whig
7th (Note: The 7th was a 1-member district.)	Jonathan W. Parker	Dem
8th (Note: The 8th was a 2-member district.)	Stephen Hempstead	Dem
8th	Warner Lewis	Dem

== Detailed Results ==
- NOTE: The Iowa General Assembly does not contain detailed vote totals for Territory Council elections in 1838.

== See also ==
- Elections in Iowa
