= Gophertown =

Former neighborhood in Omaha, Nebraska

- Neighborhood
- Etymology: Dugout homes of the neighborhood likened to gopher holes
- Interactive map of Gophertown
- Coordinates: 41°18′57″N 95°56′59″W
- Country: United States
- State: Nebraska
- City: Omaha

Gophertown was a shanty town neighborhood in Omaha, Nebraska on the north side. It was believed to be the first Irish American neighborhood in Omaha. Although the neighborhood's exact boundaries are unknown and there are no historical markers denoting it, historians believe it was situated roughly where the present-day Miller Park neighborhood stands.

== History ==
Gophertown was founded in 1857 by Irish immigrant Dennis Dee alongside his two relatives Michael and Maurice, a group that was a part of 38 Irish men who immigrated to the Omaha area. The group of three men created a dugout home to live in amidst hard times. It is disputed whether Dee dug a new shelter or reused a pre-existing ridge. Soon, a small shanty town began to form. The area became home to several Irish families with the men taking up local jobs in farming, roadwork, and ditch-digging.

The neighborhood stood near Florence. The Florence Claim Club, a de facto claim club formed by Florence residents, became aware of the settlement and took exception as Dee had not consulted the club before establishing a neighborhood nearby. James C. Mitchell, the leader of the group and founder of Florence, purportedly formed a mob to confront the Gophertown settlers, with the only written source on the incident being a now-defunct newspaper called the Omaha Nebraskian. According to the report from October 8, 1857, Mitchell and other Claim Club members stormed the Gophertown settlement to confront the men, but only found women and children as the men were away at work. When the Gophertown men received word about the incident, they returned to the settlement with firearms and shillelaghs, causing the Claim Club members to retreat. According to the Nebraskian report, the Claim Club returned later that night with firearms of their own but ultimately retreated once again.

It is unknown when Gophertown formally ceased to exist, but the area was used for the Miller Park neighborhood, founded in 1896.
