= Abbe Creek School =

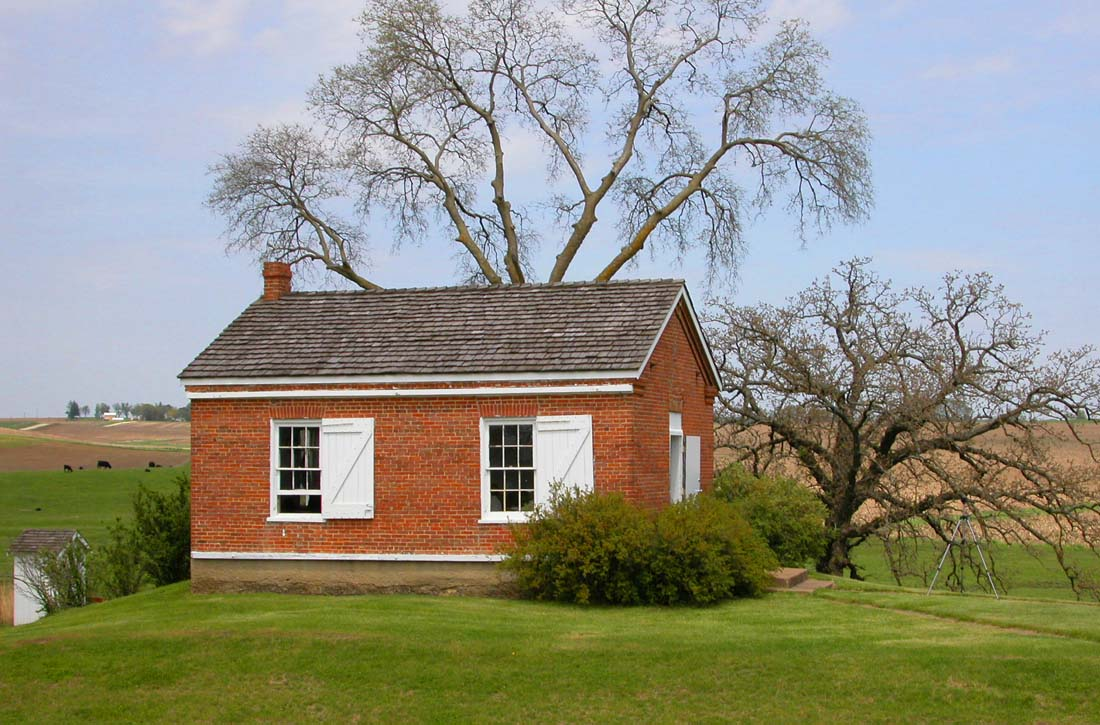
- Exterior view from cemetery
- Interactive map of the Abbe Creek School area
- Alternative names: "Little Brick"; Kepler

General information
- Type: Historic school house
- Location: Mt. Vernon, Iowa, United States
- Coordinates: 41°56′32″N 91°27′05″W
- Current tenants: Museum
- Construction started: 1856
- Closed: 1936

Design and construction
- Known for: Oldest standing one-room brick school house in Iowa

Website
- http://www.mycountyparks.com/County/Linn/Park/Abbe-Creek-School-Museum.aspx

The historic Abbe Creek School is a one-room schoolhouse museum located one mile west of Mt. Vernon, Iowa, on E48. It is believed to be the oldest standing one room brick schoolhouse in Iowa. The school is located on land claimed by William Abbe, the first white settler in Linn County, Iowa.

== History ==
=== Community established ===
Abbe Creek School was first organized in 1844 by pioneer homesteaders: Alison I. Willets; Jesse Holman; and Peter, Henry and Conrad Kepler. They engaged a carpenter named Lichtenbarger to build the first log school. The school was first called Sumner School but later it came to be known affectionately as “Little Brick.” Locally, it was called Kepler most likely because many Kepler family members attended.

=== Construction ===
Records in the Linn County assessor's office indicate that the present school house was built in 1856 of soft brick thought to have been manufactured locally at Port Stottler brickyard. The building measures 20 by 26 feet and originally faced north.

=== Restoration ===
The doors of Abbe Creek School closed on June 1, 1936, after serving the community for 92 years. The building was later converted into a private home. The school and yard were purchased from Mr. and Mrs. Eddie Pitlik in 1963, and on October 25, 1964, the restored schoolhouse was dedicated as a museum. It is now operated by the Linn County Conservation Board and is open during the summer: June – August, 1 p.m. – 4 p.m. Museum tours are available for groups at request.

== Grounds features ==
=== Cemetery ===
Behind it lay the community cemetery called Sugar Grove, where many early residents, including the first wife of William Abbe, Olive, and Zimri Davis (1783–1856, a veteran of the War of 1812) and his wife (a daughter of a Revolutionary War veteran) are buried. Two American Civil War veterans, Morris Burnett and George Thompson are also buried there. Many graves date from the 1850s, the earliest visible date is 1847.

=== Abbe Creek ===
Also on the grounds is the spring that furnished drinking water for the school. It is the source of a small feeder stream running into Abbe Creek. The original tile used to collect water is still in place. In the winter, the students would skate on the ice of frozen Abbe Creek. There is a storm cellar set into the hill of the school where students would take shelter in severe weather.

=== Lincoln Highway ===
With the grading and paving of the Lincoln Highway in 1925, the school was moved to face the East and the cemetery was isolated from it by the road. A Lincoln Highway marker still stands on the school grounds. A few hundred feet southeast of the schoolhouse site is a marker honoring William Abbe as the first settler in Linn County.

== Education ==
Known Abbe Creek Teachers

Name	Years
Ellen S. Warren	1875
Maria S. Drowns	1876-1877
Arvilla Warren	1877
U.D. Runkle	1877-1878
Ida Goudey	1878-1879
Mary C. Keidick	1879
U.D. Runkle	1879-1880
Mary C. Keidick	1880-1881
Fannie L. Dobson	1881-1882
M.A.B. Hess	1882
Kate L. Willson	1882
Mrs. Sucas A. Sucore	1882
Ira G. Fairbanks	1883
Mrs. Sucas A. Sucore	1883-1884
Alma E. Kenderine	1884-1887
Ella Owen, Mrs. John Cordes	1887
Charles N. Stodad	1888
Henry A. Collins	1888
Eva Worrell, Mrs. Eva Briggs	1888-1890
Mary E. Sherk	1890
C. Emma Wallace	1890
Clara E. Blinks	1891-1892
Bernice E. Blinks	1892-1894
F.M. Hicks	1894-1895
Lida Colton	1895
F.M. Hicks	1895-1897
Carrie Barthalomew	1897
Isabel Cowen	1897-1898
Clara E. Wallace	1898-1900
Katherine Bently	1900
Geo. W. Johnston	1900-1901

Name	Years
Mary Spry	1901
C.M. Spry	1901-1904
Flora Browning	1904-1905
Lillian Scroupe	1905
Maude Petty, Mrs. Metzger	1905-1906
Charlotte Spry	1906
Bertha Evans	1907-1908
Grace Kearns	1908
Eva Bear, Mrs. Loyd Mongun	1908-1909
Beatrice G. Brousseau	1909
Amand Whittington	1910-1914
Alice Fawcett, Mrs. Ross Emerson	1914-1915
Harriet Adams, Mrs. MeBach	1915-1916
Lillian Ehrnon	1916-1917
K. Tallman, Mrs. Burton Hogle	1917-1918
Olive E. Hahn	1918-1919
Floss Hoover	1919
Ruth Travis	1919
Anna Welty	1920
Gladys Robb	1920-1921
Anna Welty	1921-1922
Hattie Connor, Mrs. Charles Ford	1922-1924
Mrs. Glen Dee	1925-1926
Fear Thompsen, Mrs. Laurence Begley	1926-1927
Thamer Sizer, Mrs. Robert Begley	1927-1928
Bessie B. Scobey	1928-1929
Mrs. Glen Dee	1929-1930
Mrs. Florence Brace	1930-1933
Mrs. Harold Reid	1933-1934
Agnes Boyer, Mrs. Vrooman	1935-1936

=== Community ===
In pioneer times the school served as the center of community life. It served as a school on weekdays and a church on Sundays. Occasionally, a circuit reading preacher from Dubuque would hold services. Once or twice a month the local residents brought their families to sing and practice spelling in the one room school.

=== Students ===
Attendance at the school was not required. The farm work came first and in the time left over, the children went to school. Children traveled to school on foot or horseback. Each child was asked to furnish a certain amount of firewood for the school stove. Children started to attend school when they were four and rarely finished the full eight grades. If a student did pass their eighth grade examination, they were allowed to carve their initials on the brick exterior of the school. These carvings are still visible today on every side of the school. Subjects studied in school included reading (McGuffey Readers), spelling, drawing, penmanship (the Palmer Method), music, geography, arithmetic, U.S. history and grammar.

=== Teachers ===
Old school records show that teachers were paid very small salaries. In the 1870s and 1880s, pay ranged from $20 to $30 a month with no holidays allowed. The first teacher of Sumner School, William Willcox, probably received less than that. By 1897, Miss Isabel Cowen, teacher for the winter term, was paid $35 a month and allowed $10 for the care of the schoolhouse.

One infamous Abbe Creek teacher, Professor Hicks, could spit his tobacco juice into a crack of a floorboard near the stove with 80 percent accuracy.

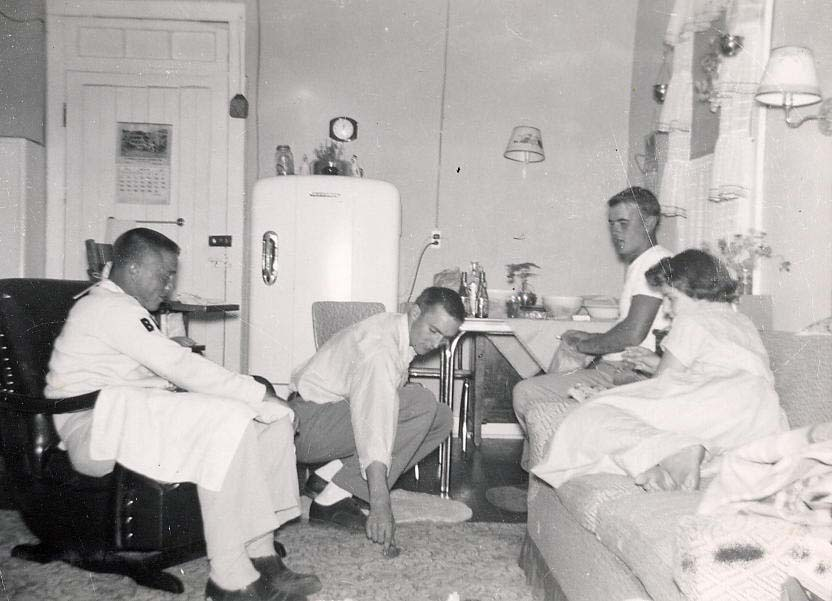
As a home in 1940's

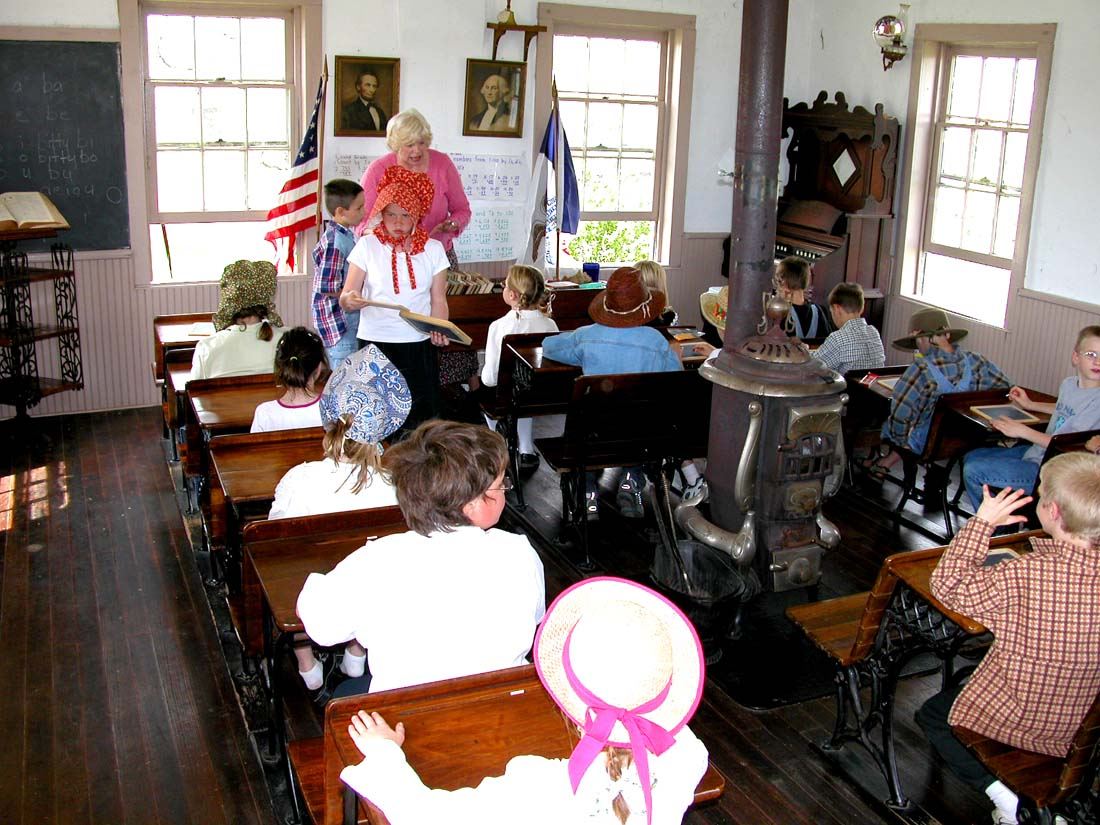
School tour
