= Torrance House =

Historic house in Iowa, United States

- U.S. National Register of Historic Places
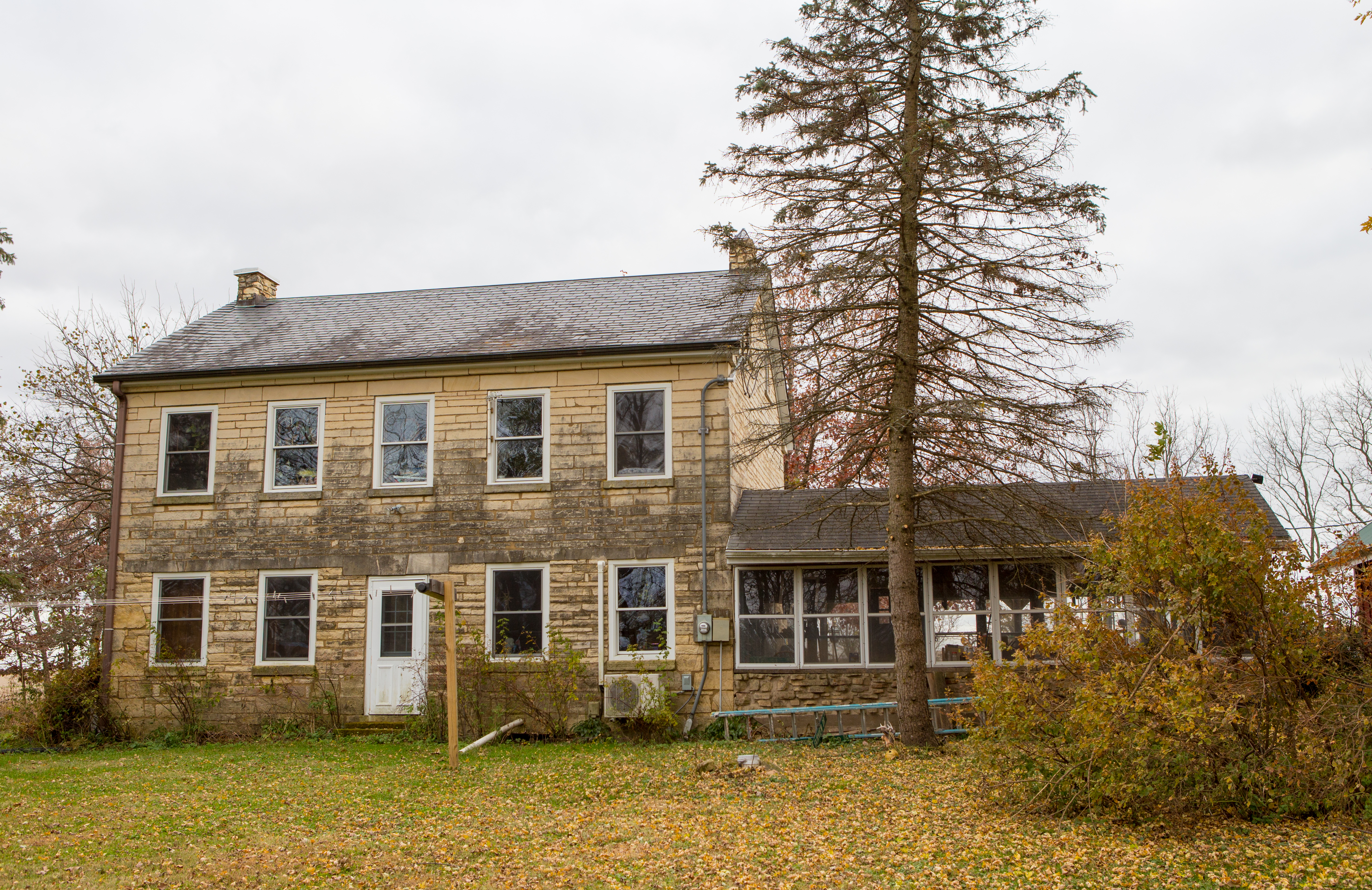

- Location within Iowa Location within the United States
- Location: South of Lisbon
- Coordinates: 41°53′44.8″N 91°23′48.5″W
- Area: less than one acre
- Built: 1856
- NRHP reference No.: 83000387
- Added to NRHP: July 7, 1983

The Torrance House is a historic building located south of Lisbon, Iowa, United States. Cunningham and Margaret Torrance were natives of Lancaster County, Pennsylvania who settled in Franklin Township in 1847. The inscription stone in the east gable gives the date of this house as 1856. It was one of a few limestone buildings in Linn County even though the region has significant deposits of the stone. The settlement-era dwelling incorporates both vernacular and classical influences in its construction. The vernacular elements include the asymmetry of the facades, and the coursed ashlar and random coursed ashlar stonework. The classical is primarily found in the stone belt courses above the second floor and gable windows on the east elevation, and above both rows of windows on the main facade. The house was listed on the National Register of Historic Places in 1983.
