= Ivanhoe, Iowa =

- Former unincorporated community
- Location within Iowa
- Coordinates: 41°53′00″N 91°27′45″W
- Country: United States
- State: Iowa
- County: Linn
- Township: Franklin
- Laid out: 1838
- Surveyed: 1841
- Founder: Anton Cowles

Ivanhoe was a town in Franklin Township, Linn County, Iowa, United States. It was founded by early Iowa settlers, and laid out as a town by Anton Cowles at the intersection of the Old Military Road and the Red Cedar River. It was laid out in 1838 and surveyed in 1841. Ivanhoe was never platted, though it did have its own post office from 1845–49. Unlike other towns founded around that time on the Old Military Road, Ivanhoe faded away; many of its residents relocated to Mount Vernon, Cedar Rapids, or Marion. The February 1921 edition of The Palimpsest describes the area as having been "a refuge for horse thieves and dealers in counterfeit money", though it is unclear whether that was during the time that the town existed or afterwards. Besides the cemetery there are no standing structures left of the old town.

== Notable person ==
- George Greene, Iowa legislator and judge

== See also ==
- Ivanhoe Cemetery
