= George Taylor (Connecticut politician) =

American politician

George Taylor (August 24, 1802 – January 14, 1881) was an American medical doctor and politician.

Taylor was born in New Milford, Connecticut, August 24, 1802, the son of William Taylor and Abigail (Starr) Taylor. His great grandfather, Rev. Daniel Boardman, and his grandfather, Rev. Nathaniel William Taylor, were the first and second pastors of New Milford.

Taylor graduated from Yale Medical School in 1824. Immediately on graduation he began practice in his native town, where he continued to reside until his death, after a long illness, January 14, 1881, in his 79th year.

He became convinced of the truth of homoeopathy in 1837, and was the first practitioner of that school in Connecticut.

He was elected to the Connecticut State Senate in 1835 and 1836, and represented New Milford in the Connecticut House of Representatives in 1833, 1834, 1850, 1863, 1871, 1872, and 1874, being in the last instance the senior member of the House, save one, in length of service. He filled various other local offices, being Judge of Probate from 1836 to 1838, from 1842 to 1844, and from 1855 to 1857, and Town Treasurer for 14 years. In 1844 he was the Democratic candidate for US Congress in his district; in 1864, a delegate to the Democratic National Convention; and in 1876, on the Democratic ticket for Presidential Elector.

He was married, Oct 25, 1826, to Harriett D. Allen, who died in 1847. Two children survived him—his only son and only grandson followed the same profession.

This article incorporates public domain material from the 1881 Yale Obituary Record.
