= William W. Chapman =

American politician

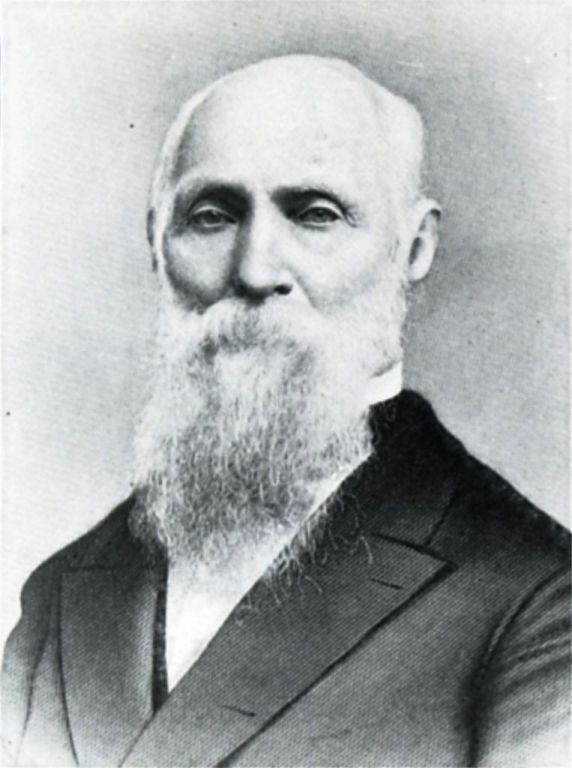

Delegate to the U.S. House of Representatives from the Iowa Territory's at-large district
- In office September 10, 1838 – October 27, 1840
- Preceded by: Constituency established
- Succeeded by: Francis Gehon (Elect)

United States Attorney for the Wisconsin Territory
- In office 1836–1838
- President: Andrew Jackson
- Preceded by: Position established
- Succeeded by: Moses M. Strong

Personal details
- Born: William Williams Chapman; August 11, 1808 Clarksburg, Virginia, U.S.
- Died: October 18, 1892 (aged 84) Portland, Oregon, U.S.
- Party: Democratic
- Spouse: Margaret Ingraham

William Williams Chapman (August 11, 1808 – October 18, 1892) was an American politician and lawyer in Oregon and Iowa. He was born and raised in Virginia. He served as a United States Attorney in Iowa when it was part of the Michigan and Wisconsin territories, and then represented the Iowa Territory in the United States House of Representatives. He later immigrated to the Oregon Country, where he served in the Oregon Territorial Legislature.

After settling in Portland, he helped to found The Oregonian newspaper and promoted economic interests in the city. He also was involved with building Canyon Road near Portland, and fought in the Rogue River War in Oregon. In later years, he served in the Oregon Legislative Assembly and promoted the expansion of railroads from Portland. Chapman Square, a park in downtown Portland, is named for him and was built on land he sold to the city.

== Early life ==
William Chapman was born in Clarksburg, Virginia, (now West Virginia) on August 11, 1808. His father died when William was fourteen, at which time he left home to earn his own way. He was educated in the public schools, and then took a job as a court clerk, while studying law on his own time. In 1832, after reading law, he earned his law license and began practice in Middletown.

Chapman married Margaret F. Ingraham (daughter of Arthur B. Ingram) in 1832, and had seven children with her. They moved to Macomb, Illinois in 1833, then to what is now Burlington, Iowa (then part of Michigan Territory) in 1835, where they were among the first settlers. The next year he became a prosecuting attorney, and was then appointed by United States President Andrew Jackson as United States Attorney for the Michigan Territory.

== Iowa ==
In 1836, the Wisconsin Territory was formed from the western section of the Michigan Territory. Chapman became the first United States Attorney for the District of Wisconsin when it was created. He was elected as colonel of the militia in 1836 after moving to what is now Dubuque, Iowa. Then in 1838, the Iowa Territory was carved from the Wisconsin Territory.

Chapman was elected as Iowa Territory's first non-voting delegate to the United States House of Representatives. A Democrat, he served from September 10, 1838, to October 27, 1840, spanning portions of the Twenty-fifth and Twenty-sixth Congresses. While in Congress he introduced legislation for a pre-emption law, the first to do so in Congress. His efforts secured for Iowa the land grant of 500,000 acres (2,000 km^{2}) for the support of common schools, and a congressional report on Iowa's boundary dispute with Missouri that was favorable to Iowa.

After his term expired, Chapman returned to Iowa, relocating in 1843 to Agency City in Wapello County. In 1844, he served as a delegate to Iowa's Constitutional Convention, which was held in Iowa City and led to the entry of Iowa into the Union as the 29th state in 1846. Chapman left Iowa in 1847, traveling the Oregon Trail to the Oregon Country.

== Oregon ==
He left in May and arrived in November of what was still the unorganized Oregon Country. At this time the region was under the jurisdiction of the United States after the settling of the Oregon boundary dispute with Great Britain the previous year. In Oregon, Chapman settled first in what was then Marysville, and is now Corvallis, in the Willamette Valley. In 1848, he relocated to Salem, where he learned of the California Gold Rush while at court at Knox Butte. Chapman went to California for a brief time and had some success in the gold fields before returning in 1849 to Oregon, which had become the Oregon Territory in 1848.

He accompanied Joseph Lane, the newly appointed governor of the territory, on his return trip to Oregon. Chapman was elected to the first session of the Oregon Territorial Legislature later in 1849, representing Champoeg County (now Marion) in the legislature's lower house. After the legislature finished its session, he moved to Oregon City and then Portland, both downstream of Salem on the Willamette River. Later in 1849, he took a trip to San Francisco, California, where he recruited Thomas J. Dryer to move to Portland and start a newspaper. He also purchased The Gold Hunter newspaper and moved the assets of the paper to Portland. In 1850, The Oregonian began publishing as a weekly newspaper in Portland. Dryer served as the publisher with Chapman as a co-founder. Chapman gave the paper its name. The assets of The Gold Hunter were used to start the paper.

Chapman purchased land in Portland from Stephen Coffin and Daniel H. Lownsdale in 1850, which he then cleared and built a home. This is now the site of the Multnomah County Courthouse. In Portland, he was a promoter of the city and helped to get Canyon Road built to ensure the city would become the commercial center of Oregon. Chapman practiced law, and in October 1851 he was held in contempt of court by Oregon Supreme Court justice Orville C. Pratt. Chapman was ordered to be sent to jail in the county seat of Hillsboro for 20 days and disbarred, but never went to jail and the order was revoked when Pratt was replaced on the court by justice Thomas Nelson. Chapman had accused Pratt of mistreating lawyers in an affidavit.

Chapman left Portland in 1853 for Fort Umpqua in Southern Oregon. There he engaged in cattle ranching while keeping his Portland law practice. He served as a lieutenant colonel in the militia during the Rogue River War that was fought from 1855 to 1856 against the Native Americans in Southern Oregon. After the war he returned to Corvallis in 1856 before moving to Eugene in 1857. Chapman was appointed as surveyor general of Oregon and served from 1857 to 1861 when he returned to Portland. He left this federal government position due to his opposition to the election of Abraham Lincoln as U.S. president. Oregon entered the Union as the 33rd state in 1859.

== Later years ==
Upon returning to Portland he built a home at 12th and Jefferson streets in what is now Downtown Portland. Chapman then returned to the practice of law. He also worked to secure Portland's economic future by promoting the construction of the railroad line to California to link with the transcontinental rail line. From 1870 to 1876 he started three companies with the goal of creating a railroad connecting Portland to the Union Pacific's transcontinental railroad. Chapman's proposed line would have traveled through the Columbia River Gorge to The Dalles, Oregon, where it would then travel southeast to Salt Lake City, Utah, linking to the Union Pacific line.

In 1868, he returned to the legislature, representing Multnomah County in the Oregon House of Representatives as a Democrat. While in the legislature, he worked to get a $30,000 government subsidy to purchase and operate a large steam tugboat at the mouth of the Columbia River. This vessel was used to pilot ships across the Columbia Bar and thus improved maritime commerce for Portland. In 1870, he sold two blocks of land in downtown to the City of Portland, which would become the Plaza Blocks between Third and Fourth avenues at Main Street.

William Williams Chapman died in Portland on October 18, 1892, at the age of 84, and was buried at Lone Fir Cemetery in that city. Chapman School in Portland was named in his honor.

Chapman Square, part of the Plaza Blocks parks with Lownsdale Square, is also named in his honor. The two blocks were purchased from Chapman for $1200. Lownsdale Square contains the Spanish–American War Soldier's Monument, erected after Harvey W. Scott wrote an editorial pleading for a monument to the war on June 18, 1899. The monument includes the statue of a soldier dressed for the Spanish–American War sculpted by Douglas Tilden. While the granite base is inscribed with Roman numerals indicating 1904, the base was not received until October 1905, and the monument was not dedicated until May 30, 1906, Memorial Day. The final cost of the monument was $14,722, paid for by donations following Scott's plea. The monument also contains two howitzers, donated by Henry E. Dosch, which he found buried in the beach near Fort Sumter. Dosch noted the howitzers had been used by both sides in the American Civil War. There is also a drinking fountain in the square, Fountain for Company H, donated to the city by the Ladies Auxiliary of Company H (of the 2nd Oregon Volunteer Infantry Regiment). The fountain was a design of John H. Beaver, dedicated on September 2, 1914.

== See also ==
- List of United States attorneys for Wisconsin

Legal offices
New office	United States Attorney for the Wisconsin Territory; 1836–1838	Succeeded by Moses M. Strong
U.S. House of Representatives
New constituency	Delegate to the U.S. House of Representatives from the Iowa Territory's at-large congressional district 1838–1840	Succeeded by Francis Gehon; Elect
