= Iowa Territory's at-large congressional district =

Former congressional district

Coordinates: 42°N 93°W

- Obsolete district
- Created: 1838, as a non-voting delegate was granted by Congress
- Eliminated: 1846, as a result of statehood
- Years active: 1838–1846

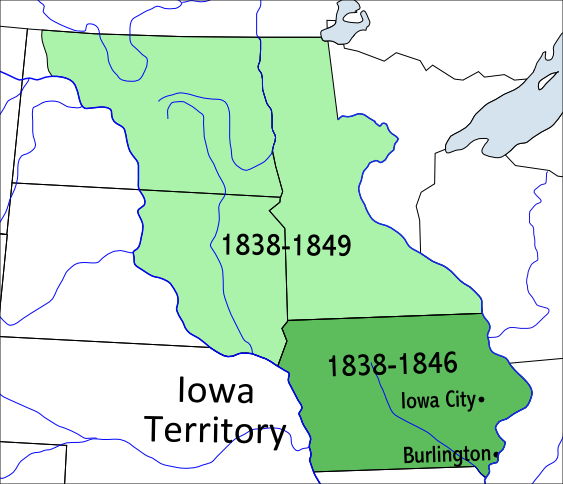
Iowa Territory in 1838

Iowa Territory's at-large congressional district is an obsolete congressional district that encompassed the area of the Iowa Territory, which was split off from the Wisconsin Territory in 1838. After Iowa's admission to the Union as the 29th state by act of Congress on December 28, 1846, this district was dissolved and replaced by Iowa's at-large congressional district.

== List of delegates representing the district ==
On June 12, 1838, an act of Congress gave Iowa Territory the authority to elect a delegate to Congress.

Delegate (Residence)	Party	Years	Cong ress	Electoral history
William W. Chapman (Burlington)	Democratic	September 10, 1838 – October 27, 1840	25th 26th	Elected in 1838. Democrat Francis Gehon was elected in 1839, but never took office. Congress then extended Chapman's term to bring the office in line with the rest of the House. Term expired by law.
Augustus C. Dodge (Burlington)	Democratic	October 28, 1840 – December 28, 1846	26th 27th 28th 29th	Elected in 1840 for the short term, per Act of Congress. Re-elected in 1841. Re-elected in 1843. Re-elected in 1845. Seat eliminated when statehood achieved.

== See also ==
- Iowa's congressional districts
