= Augustus Caesar Dodge House =

Historic house in Iowa, United States

- U.S. National Register of Historic Places
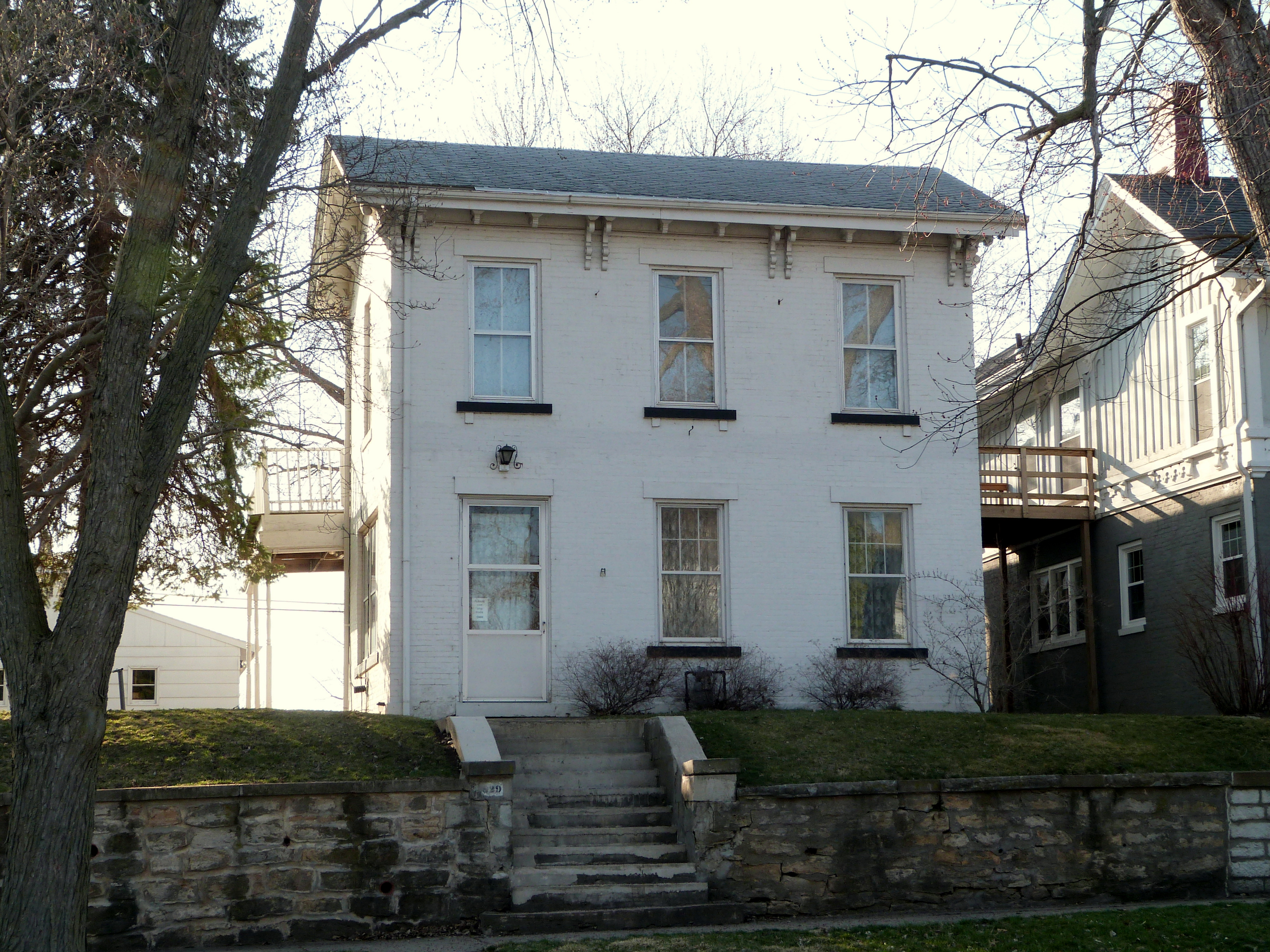

- Location within Iowa Location within the United States
- Location: 829 N. 5th St., Burlington, Iowa
- Coordinates: 40°48′57″N 91°06′12″W
- Area: less than one acre
- Built: c. 1865
- Architectural style: Italianate
- NRHP reference No.: 80001446
- Added to NRHP: September 14, 1982; 43 years ago

The Augustus Caesar Dodge House is a historic building located in Burlington, Iowa, United States. Augustus C. Dodge came to Burlington as Registrar of the Land Office, a political appointment of President Martin Van Buren. As a Democrat, he went on to serve as the Iowa Territory's Delegate to the U.S. House of Representatives (1840-1846), one of Iowa's first two U.S. Senators (1848-1854), Minister to Spain under Presidents Franklin Pierce and James Buchanan (1855-1859), and then Mayor of Burlington (1874-1875). The two-story, brick house follows an L-shaped plan and was built sometime around in the mid-to-late 1860s. It is representative of Burlington's mid-19th century architecture. The house is not clearly defined by any particular architectural style, but the bracketed eaves allow it to be classified as a vernacular form of the Italianate style. It was listed on the National Register of Historic Places in 1980.
