= Abbe Creek =

Stream in Iowa, USA

Abbe Creek Tributary to Big Creek
- Location of Abbe Creek mouth Abbe Creek (the United States)

Location
- Country: United States
- State: Iowa
- County: Linn

Physical characteristics
- Source: Elbow Creek divide
  - location: about 4 miles southwest of Martelle, Iowa
  - coordinates: 41°59′13″N 91°31′35″W
  - elevation: 870 ft (270 m)
- Mouth: Big Creek
  - location: about 0.25 miles northeast of Bertram, Iowa
  - coordinates: 41°57′12″N 91°31′35″W
  - elevation: 709 ft (216 m)
- Length: 5.72 mi (9.21 km)
- Basin size: 4.17 square miles (10.8 km^{2})
- Discharge
  - location: Big Creek
  - average: 4.24 cu ft/s (0.120 m^{3}/s) at mouth with Big Creek

Basin features
- Progression: Big Creek → Cedar River → Iowa River → Mississippi River → Gulf of Mexico
- River system: Iowa River
- Tributaries
  - left: unnamed tributaties
  - right: unnamed tributaries
- Bridges: Museum Road, Ballard Road, Horn Road, W Mt Vernon Road, O'Conner Road

Abbe Creek is a stream in Linn County, Iowa, in the United States. Abbe Creek was named after William Abbe, a settler of Linn County.

== Variant name ==
According to the Geographic Names Information System, it has also been known historically as "Abby Creek".

== Course ==
Abbe Creek rises about 4 miles southwest of Martelle, Iowa in Linn County and then flows generally west to join the Big Creek about 0.25 miles northeast of Bertram.

== Watershed ==
Abbe Creek drains 4.17 square miles (10.8 km^{2}) of area, receives about 35.7 in/year of precipitation, has a wetness index of 470.72, and is about 8% forested.

== See also ==
- List of rivers of Iowa
