= Bellevue War =

1840 Iowa Territory shootout

Date	April 1, 1840
Location	Bellevue, Iowa Territory, U.S.
Result	Posse victory: Arrest and whipping of surviving supporters of Brown

Participants
Bellevue posse	Brown outfit

Commanders and leaders
Thomas Cox; W. A. Warren	W. W. Brown †

Casualties and losses
3 dead; 1 wounded	3 dead; 1 wounded
- 1 civilian killed

The Bellevue War was a shootout between a posse led by Sheriff W. A. Warren and Thomas Cox against a group led by W. W. Brown that took place in Bellevue, Jackson County, Iowa Territory, on April 1, 1840. A large mural made by local artists commemorates the incident at the site of Brown's Hotel where it occurred. Political tensions in Bellevue dated back to 1837, when Yankee businessmen arrived at the town, causing tensions with the original settlers. The original settlers banded with wealthy hotelier W. W. Brown, who provided them with credit and an opportunity to work. A shooting on January 8, 1840, further intensified the situation.

Brown previously attempted to usurp territory representative Thomas Cox as the Democrats' candidate in the 1840 election. This infuriated Cox, who drafted a warrant for Brown's arrest following the shooting incident. Sheriff W. A. Warren, a former political opponent of Brown himself, authorized a posse to apprehend Brown. After an attempt to negotiate, the posse moved in on Brown's hotel. Brown apparently accidentally discharged his weapon, causing a gunfight to break out. Three more were killed on each side. The posse set the hotel on fire and captured those who attempted to escape. They were sentenced to receive a whipping and commanded to leave the county.

== History ==
=== Tensions ===
The first settlers in Bellevue, Iowa Territory, were miners from Galena, Illinois and southerners who distrusted eastern Yankees. In the spring of 1837, a large group of Yankees from Coldwater, Michigan, settled in Bellevue, creating tensions between them and the original settlers. One new arrival, William W. Brown, came with a substantial fortune and purchased the only hotel in town. The original settlers appreciated Brown's hospitality and open-handedness with credit. Brown would also pay high wages every winter to have the original settlers haul wood over the iced Mississippi River. Thus, the settlers formed a strong association with Brown.

Other Yankee settlers of Bellevue did not appreciate Brown's wealth. Brown was accused of acquiring wealth through dishonest methods. Some of the currency spent by Brown's associates was found to be counterfeit. Brown's associates in turn harassed those who accused Brown of wrongdoings. An increase in local cattle and horse rustlings made locals suspicious of Brown's group. In 1838, Brown announced his candidacy for Sheriff of Jackson County, where Bellevue was located. However, Whig William A. Warren of Burlington was able to secure the election. At the same election, Democrat Thomas Cox was elected as a representative to the first Iowa Territory general assembly. Brown was named a justice of the peace in 1839 and frequently defended his associates in court. The relationship at this point between Cox and Brown was considered cordial.

Cox's opinion of Brown quickly soured. Ebenezer Brigham, a colleague of Cox's from Illinois who was currently serving on the Wisconsin territorial council, came to Bellevue to search for a friend's stolen horses. Sheriff Warren recognized the description as a pair that had recently been apprehended from a boarder in Brown's hotel. Cox was infuriated at what he perceived to be Brown's role in the affair. In late 1839 or early 1840, the Democratic Party held a caucus to determine a candidate from Jackson County for the territorial house. Cox was busy platting Iowa City, so he was not present. However, he expected to be easily renominated. Instead, the caucus settled on Brown as their candidate. This began a rivalry between Cox and Brown. Cox ran as an independent, accusing Brown of associating with criminals. Cox won the election, causing further tensions in Bellevue as opponents of Brown rallied to his side.

=== Shooting of James Thompson ===
Brown's associate James Thompson and Democrat James C. Mitchell got into a heated argument late in January 1840. Mitchell barricaded his house and put oak shutters on his windows to prevent Thompson from attacking. Mitchell also had a quarrel with one of his brothers. On January 8, the Democrats celebrated Jackson Day, which commemorated the Battle of New Orleans, and Mitchell was named the head of a celebratory ball. He explicitly forbid any allies of Brown from attending the affair, infuriating Brown's associates.

During the ball, Mitchell's brother left to go to James' house, ostensibly to retrieve clothing from a trunk. He claimed that the trunk belonged to his own wife and claimed to have taken a justice of the peace with him to prove that he was not going to take anything that did not belong to him. He was accompanied by Thompson, who had been drinking excessively. Upon their arrival, Thompson found a lady in a bed and attempted to assault her. The lady escaped and told James Mitchell about what happened. Mitchell armed himself and encountered Thompson. Both men raised their guns and attempted to shoot. Thompson's gun failed to properly fire, but Mitchell's fired a round into Thompson's chest, killing him. Mitchell returned to the ball, fearful of retribution from Brown's associates. Absalom Montgomery, who had followed Thompson in an attempt to persuade him away from combat, reported the incident to the sheriff. Sheriff Warren promised protection to Mitchell as long as he was willing to show in court.

The next morning, a coroner confirmed the cause of death. Mitchell was transferred to a justice office and charged with Thompson's murder. The case was scheduled to be heard at the next meeting of the circuit court. Mitchell was put in chains and left in a room in the justice office, as the county had no jail at the time. In the meantime, Cox helped to draft a warrant for the arrest of W. W. Brown and twenty-two associates for thieving, passing counterfeit money, robbing, and other charges. It was signed by Charles Harris, a justice of the peace living near Fulton. The Cox faction now had legal authority to arrest the Brown faction.

=== Posse ===
Cox consulted with Warren, who warned him that Brown had many friends in Bellevue, making an arrest difficult. When he learned of the warrant, Brown offered to turn himself in, but refused to divulge information about his associates. Cox held a meeting at the house of James L. Kirkpatrick to decide what to do. The group decided to form a posse to apprehend Brown's gang. Warren canvassed the county, urging prominent citizens to write to Brown to convince him to surrender his men. The sheriff deputized Cox to select forty men to appear on his behalf on April 1, 1840.

Warren and Cox both rounded up men for the posse. Warren claimed that he only sought to arrest Brown, but Cox told prospective members that he wanted to drive Brown and his gang out of the county. Warren was only able to convince one man, while Cox recruited the others. Cox had many connections with military experience. His brother-in-law James Collins was a colonel in the Black Hawk War and many of his former soldiers worked in the Galena mines. Cox was able to convince many of them to join. Anson Harrington, who assisted with the drafting of the warrant, recruited three of his friends. Cox was also able to enlist the help of his neighbors.

=== Gunfight ===
When April 1 came, the two factions first attempted to negotiate through parlay. In the afternoon, Warren traveled to Brown's hotel to read the warrant. Shortly thereafter, Cox arrived with the posse. Although a large group of citizens were standing at Brown's defense, they quickly scattered when they saw Cox's posse marching with military discipline. Unable to come to terms, Warren left the hotel and Cox's posse advanced. Brown stood in the door of the hotel holding a rifle. Cox demanded his surrender, and apparently Brown complied and lowered his weapon. However, while doing so, he accidentally discharged it. The ensuing bullet ripped through Cox's coat. Two of Cox's associates, purportedly John T. Sublett and V. G. Smith, fired back, killing Brown. Brown's associates returned fire. During the exchange, the posse set the hotel on fire, prompting Brown's associates to flee. Between five and thirteen members of the gang were apprehended.

=== Aftermath ===
Three members of the posse were killed: Henderson Palmer, John Brink, and J. Maxwell. Another, William Vaughn, was seriously wounded. Two members of Brown's gang were killed: Aaron Day and Mr. Burtis. Brown's hostler, Tom Walch, was severely wounded. One civilian, Andrew Farley, was killed when tending to Day. Cox and Warren initially intended to hang the captives immediately, but decided to instead bury the dead, extinguish the fire, and wait for the next morning. The posse held a ballot to determine the fate of the captives. They were instructed to drop a white bean if they were in favor of hanging and a red bean if they were in favor of whipping. The final count was thirty-eight white beans to forty-two red beans. Captives received between four and thirty-nine lashes and then were sent down the Mississippi River on a board. They were commanded to never enter the county again. One member, William Fox, later joined the Banditti of the Prairie in Illinois. The posse was also subject to a trial, but the jury found that they acted within a reasonable interpretation of the law.

Despite some public outrage over the incident, Cox was re-elected to the state house the next summer and was subsequently named Speaker of the House. He later served in the territory council (senate) before his death in 1844. Warren later reminisced that they had no evidence and that they did not want to arrest Brown. He remained sheriff until 1845.
