= 1875 Iowa gubernatorial election =

- October 12, 1875
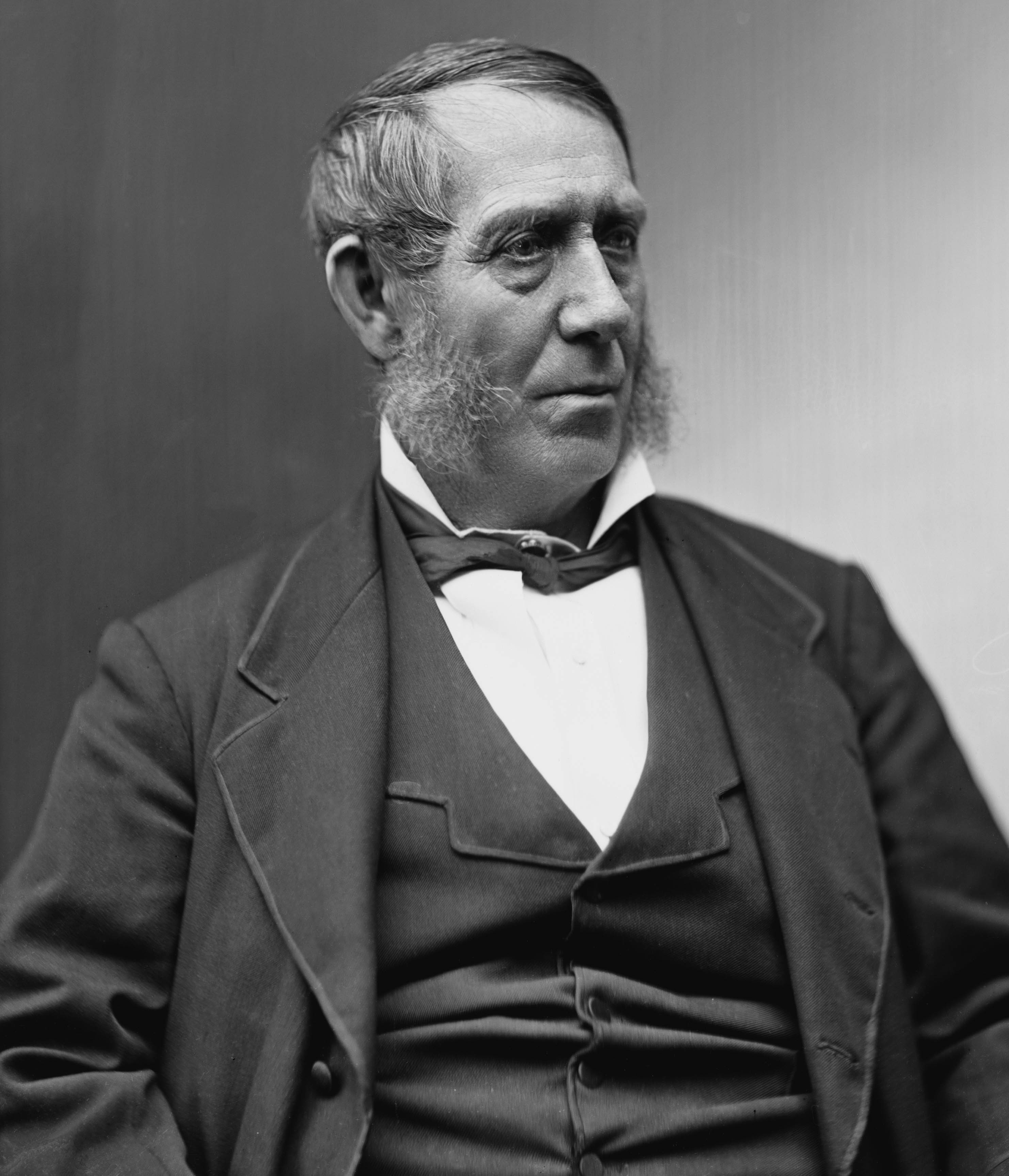

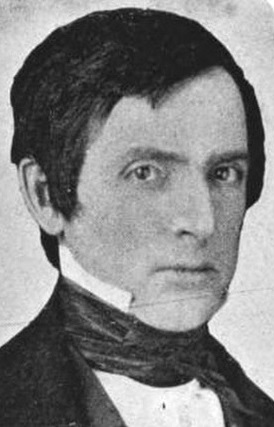
Nominee	Samuel J. Kirkwood	Shepherd Leffler
Party	Republican	Democratic
Popular vote	124,855	93,270
Percentage	57.03%	42.61%
- County results Kirkwood: 50–60% 60–70% 70–80% 80–90% 90–100% Leffler: 50–60% 60–70%
Governor before election
Cyrus C. Carpenter
Republican
Elected Governor
Samuel J. Kirkwood
Republican

The 1875 Iowa gubernatorial election was held on October 12, 1875. Republican nominee Samuel J. Kirkwood defeated Democratic nominee Shepherd Leffler with 57.03% of the vote.

== General election ==
=== Candidates ===
Major party candidates

- Samuel J. Kirkwood, Republican
- Shepherd Leffler, Democratic

Other candidates

- J. H. Lozier, Prohibition

=== Results ===
1875 Iowa gubernatorial election
Party	Candidate	Votes	%	±%
Republican	Samuel J. Kirkwood	124,855	57.03%	
Democratic	Shepherd Leffler	93,270	42.61%	
Prohibition	J. H. Lozier	737	0.34%	
Majority		31,585		
Turnout				
Republican hold		Swing		
