= Augustus C. Dodge =

American politician

Augustus Dodge
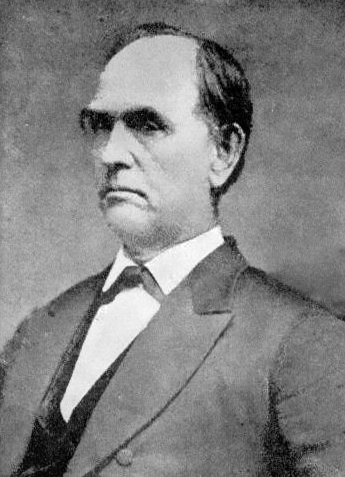

14th United States Minister to Spain
- In office June 17, 1855 – March 12, 1859
- President: Franklin Pierce; James Buchanan
- Preceded by: Pierre Soulé
- Succeeded by: William Preston

United States Senator from Iowa
- In office December 7, 1848 – February 22, 1855
- Preceded by: Seat established
- Succeeded by: James Harlan

Delegate to the U.S. House of Representatives from the Iowa Territory's at-large district
- In office October 28, 1840 – December 28, 1846
- Preceded by: Francis Gehon (Delegate-elect)
- Succeeded by: Serranus Hastings (Representative)

Personal details
- Born: Augustus Caesar Dodge; January 2, 1812 Ste. Genevieve, Missouri, U.S.
- Died: November 20, 1883 (aged 71) Burlington, Iowa, U.S.
- Resting place: Aspen Grove Cemetery; Burlington, Iowa, U.S.
- Party: Democratic
- Parent: Henry Dodge (father)

Military service
- Allegiance: United States
- Branch/service: United States Army
- Battles/wars: Black Hawk War

Augustus Caesar Dodge (January 4, 1812 – November 21, 1883) was a Democratic delegate to the U.S. House of Representatives from Iowa Territory, a U.S. minister to Spain, and one of the first set of United States senators to represent Iowa after it was admitted to the Union as a state. His father, Henry Dodge, served as a U.S. senator from Wisconsin; the two were the first and so far the only father-son pair to serve concurrently in the Senate, which they did from 1848 to 1855.

Augustus Dodge was born in what is now Ste. Genevieve, Missouri (then in Louisiana Territory). Self-educated, he moved to Illinois in 1827, settled in Galena, and was employed there in various capacities in his father's lead mines. He served in the Black Hawk War and other Indian wars. In 1837, he moved to what is now Burlington, Iowa (then in Wisconsin Territory), where he served as register of the land office until 1840.

== Delegate ==
Congress created Iowa Territory in 1838, from what was formerly the Iowa District of Wisconsin Territory. As a result of the Act of March 3, 1839, the position of Iowa Territory's Delegate to the U.S. House would become vacant on October 27, 1840, and Dodge was elected to fill it. After initially serving in the Twenty-sixth United States Congress, he was re-elected in 1840 (to the Twenty-seventh Congress), 1842 (to the Twenty-eighth Congress), and 1844 (to the Twenty-ninth Congress). He served as delegate until Iowa became a state in December 1846, and his role was replaced by two voting Representatives.

== Senator ==
For its first two years, the Iowa General Assembly failed to choose Iowa's first U.S. senators, due to a three-way split that prevented any candidate from earning the required number of 30 legislators' votes. However, after the 1848 elections gave the Democratic Party a greater share of Iowa legislators, Dodge (and George Wallace Jones) were elected as Iowa's first two U.S. senators. By drawing lots, Dodge received the seat with the shorter term (to expire in 1849), but was re-elected that year to a full six-year term. While in the Senate, he served as chairman of the committee to Audit and Control the Contingent Expenses (in the Thirty-first and Thirty-second Congresses), the Committee on Pensions (in the Thirty-first Congress), the Committee on Revolutionary Claims (in the Thirty-second Congress), and the Committee on Public Lands (in the Thirty-third Congress).

On December 14, 1853, Dodge introduced a bill to organize the new territory of Nebraska. Under the leadership of Illinois Senator Stephen Douglas, that bill eventually became the Kansas-Nebraska Act, which Dodge supported forcefully.

In 1854, as Dodge's second term was near its end, the Iowa General Assembly chose Free Soil Party member (and future Republican) James Harlan, rather than Dodge. Dodge was the preferred choice of Democratic legislators, whose ranks had declined. But in a failed effort to defeat Harlan by uniting Democrats and nationalist Whigs behind a single candidate, Dodge dropped out after the fourth ballot.

Dodge served in the Senate until February 22, 1855, when President Franklin Pierce appointed him to the post of minister to Spain. He served as the minister until 1859.

== Life after the Senate ==
Dodge unsuccessfully ran for Governor of Iowa in 1859, losing to Republican Samuel J. Kirkwood. He served as mayor of Burlington, Iowa from 1874 to 1875.

In 1868, Dodge supported the candidacy of George H. Pendleton for the Democratic presidential nomination. During that same election year, Dodge himself had been mentioned for the vice-presidency. "His nomination", said The Democratic Watchman (Bellfontaine, Pennsylvania) "would probably give satisfaction to as many Democrats as that of any other western man." Looking toward the 1872 presidential election, Dodge recommended Thomas A. Hendricks as a "worthy, able and excellent man." He believed that there was strong support throughout the Midwest for the Indianan, although he doubted that Hendricks would run well in the East.

He died in Burlington, Iowa on November 20, 1883, and was interred in Aspen Grove Cemetery in Burlington.

Dodge was the nephew of Missouri Senator Lewis F. Linn. His brother-in-law James Clarke served as the third and last Governor of Iowa Territory.

== Legacy ==
Dodge County, Nebraska and Dodge Street in Omaha, Nebraska were named after Augustus Dodge. His home in Burlington, Iowa is listed on the National Register of Historic Places as the Augustus Caesar Dodge House.

U.S. House of Representatives
Preceded by Francis Gehon; Elect	Delegate to the U.S. House of Representatives from the Iowa Territory's at-large congressional district 1840–1846	Succeeded by Serranus Hastings as U.S. Representative
U.S. Senate
New seat	U.S. Senator (Class 3) from Iowa; 1848–1855; Served alongside: George Wallace Jones	Succeeded by James Harlan
Preceded by Isaac P. Walker	Chair of the Senate Expenses Committee; 1849–1853	Succeeded by Josiah J. Evans
Preceded by Solon Borland	Chair of the Senate Public Lands Committee; 1853–1855	Succeeded by Charles E. Stuart
Diplomatic posts
Preceded by Pierre Soulé	United States Ambassador to Spain; 1855–1859	Succeeded by William Preston
Party political offices
Preceded by Ben Samuels	Democratic nominee for Governor of Iowa; 1859	Succeeded by William Merritt
