= Thomas Stokeley Wilson =

American judge (1813–1894)

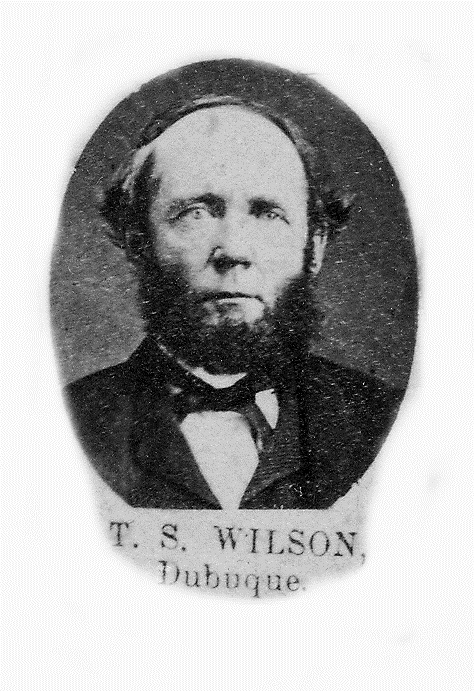
- Newspaper photograph of Wilson.

Justice of the Iowa Supreme Court
- In office December 28, 1846 – October 31, 1847

Personal details
- Born: October 13, 1813 Steubenville, Ohio, U.S.
- Died: May 16, 1894 (aged 80) Dubuque, Iowa, U.S.
- Party: Democratic
- Education: Jefferson College
- Occupation: Attorney, judge

Thomas Stokeley Wilson (October 13, 1813 – May 16, 1894) was a judge and attorney from Iowa. Born in Steubenville, Ohio, he graduated from Jefferson College (now Washington & Jefferson College) in 1833. He served in the Iowa House of Representatives 1866 and 1868 as a Democrat. He was a Judge of the Supreme Court of Iowa Territory 1838-1839 and Judge of the Iowa Supreme Court from December 28, 1846, to October 31, 1847, appointed from Dubuque County, Iowa, and Iowa District Court judge 1852–1863. He died in Dubuque, Iowa.

Political offices
Preceded by	Justice of the Iowa Supreme Court; 1846–1847	Succeeded by
