= James C. Mitchell (settler) =

James C. Mitchell (1810-1860) was an early settler of Bellevue, Iowa, and went on to the found the town of Florence in the Nebraska Territory in 1854.

== Biography ==
Born in Pangborn, Pennsylvania, in 1810, Mitchell left home at the age of fifteen to become a seaman. By age eighteen, he was captain of the Lyden and the Lady Washington, ships which sailed between New York City and Liverpool, England. In 1836, Mitchell married Eliza Krosnick-Vandenberg (b. 1809), the Cape Colony widow of a Royal Navy chaplain who was lost at sea. Until 1838, Mitchell lived in England with his wife and his step-daughter Hannah Vandenberg.

In 1840 James C. Mitchell moved with his family to Bellevue, Iowa, where he worked as an Indian Commissioner. He and his wife adopted J. Ann Floyd to be their daughter. While in Bellevue, Mr. and Mrs. Mitchell ran a store that sold dry, wet, and grocery goods. Mitchell saw some hard times in Bellevue, including being indicted for running an illegal gambling house and being sued several times on account of debt. Toward the end of their time in Iowa, J. C. Mitchell signed the temperance pledge, a copy of which was published in the Jackson County Democrat on Friday, September 21, 1849.

As the '49 Gold Rush hit and folks started moving west, James C. Mitchell and his family moved west, as well, to Council Bluffs, where they owned and operated two very successful stores. Mitchell was enchanted with the idea of the transcontinental railroad as a way to help his fellow midwesterners receive some of the bounty he had observed during a brief sojourn to the gold country in California. Following the advice of Peter A. Sarpy, Mitchell bought the land where the abandoned Mormon settlement of Cutler's Park stood, platting and settling in the new village of Florence, work that he, his team, and his family accomplished between 1853 and 1855. As he sighted the town, he had in mind its being a perfect location for a bridge crossing the river. The name of the town is said to be in honor of Florence Kilbourn, a niece of Mrs. Mitchell's.

Mitchell thought the town would be the Nebraska Territory's capital, and in 1854 he co-founded the Nebraska Winter Quarters Company, which became the Florence Land Company in 1855. Mitchell himself owned 277 lots in Florence and was very active in real estate in both Florence and Columbus, Nebraska. Mitchell joined the first board of the Bank of Florence in 1856.

Mitchell died in Florence in 1860.

== Role in the Bellevue War ==
James C. Mitchell was a prominent citizen in the early days of Bellevue, Iowa. He was, in fact, instrumental in the factional tensions that led up to the final confrontation of what is commonly known as the Bellevue War in 1840. For many, a man named James Thompson was the visible leader of a band of criminals and the rough citizens who supported them, while Mitchell was the local leader of the law-and-order faction. The two had more than one angry altercation, filled with threats. At on occasion, Thompson went so far as to call Mitchell a "Marked Man" and to threaten his safety, should they ever encounter one another alone.

The rivalry between Thompson's faction and Mitchell's came to a head on January 8, 1840, the evening of a Jackson Day ball in Bellevue. Accounts are conflicting as to the details, but the essential facts are this: While Mitchell and most of his group were busy at the ball, Thompson and one or two other men raided Mitchell's house. While there, Thompson attempted to assault a young woman who had stayed back from the celebrations. When news reached Mitchell of this outrage, he armed himself and went looking for Thompson. Thompson knew that he was now the marked man, and he went looking for Mitchell. When they found one another, both men fired, but Thompson's gun failed. Mitchell's shot struck home and killed Thompson almost instantly.

Mitchell holed up in the hotel where the ball was being held and his wife, his family, and his friends fought off would-be attacks from vengeful friends of Thompson. W. W. Brown took charge of the groups and negotiated a tense peace with Sheriff W. A. Warren. Mitchell was locked up in his own house under guard on Warren's guarantee. Thompson's friends did not trust the justice system to avenge the killing and so they made an attempt to blow up Mitchell's house and kill him and his family, but the plot was foiled by a turncoat member of their gang.

For better or worse, Mitchell remained under house confinement for some time after that. On April 1, 1840, Sheriff Warren helped to lead a citizens' charge on W. W. Brown's hotel, the culmination of Mitchell's law-and-order work. Mitchell asked to participate and Warren did not permit it, but he did give the prisoner arms in case he was attacked during the violence, since he had yet to face trial for the killing of Thompson, and Brown's men were none too happy about that.

Mitchell was finally indicted for manslaughter on April 17, 1840, and released on bail with the security assurances of several of his companions. He was tried and found not guilty on June 19, 1840.

== Claims ==
Mitchell owned several claims and ran numerous enterprises throughout the Territory. They included Elk Horn and Loup Fork Ferry and Bridge Company, the Winter Quarter Ferry, land once owned by the Council Buffs and Nebraska Ferry Company along the Missouri River, the Columbus Company, the steam ferry boat Nebraska No. 2, and the Florence Bridge Company.

== Politics ==
James C. Mitchell served on a credentialing committee in the early territorial legislature of Nebraska. Mitchell served in the First Territorial Council and cast the vote that gave the early capital to Omaha, despite his own town of Florence being under consideration. In order to secure his vote, Mitchell was appointed the sole commissioner for the new capitol building and granted an enlargement for his Douglas County land interests. He ultimately selected a site on High School Hill, where Central High School now stands.

== See also ==
- History of Omaha

== Elsewhere online ==
- "A History of the James C. Mitchell House," by Adam Fletcher Sasse for NorthOmahaHistory.com. Retrieved April 24, 2020.
