= Big Creek (Des Moines River tributary) =

Stream in Iowa, USA

Coordinates: 41°44′17″N 93°42′29″W

Big Creek is a stream in the U.S. state of Iowa. It is a tributary to the Des Moines River.

Big Creek was so named due to its relatively large size compared to other nearby streams.
