= Franklin Township, Linn County, Iowa =

Township in Linn County, Iowa, U.S.

Coordinates: 41.9058°N 91.4175°W

Franklin Township is a township in Linn County, Iowa.

== History ==
Franklin Township was organized in 1841.
