= Thomas Cox (politician) =

American politician

Thomas Cox (1787 – November 9, 1844) was an American pioneer, politician, and surveyor from what is now Kentucky. His family moved to the Indiana Territory, where Cox joined the territory militia. He was promoted to a lieutenant colonel and may have seen service in the War of 1812. After the war, he became a surveyor to help support his family. He also served in county politics until the state of Illinois was formed in 1818. Cox was elected to its 1st General Assembly as a state senator, serving for two years. He then worked as Register of the U.S. Land Office in Springfield, Illinois, but fell into debt after some poor land speculation deals.

Cox served again in the militia near the end of the Black Hawk War, then was appointed a surveyor of the resulting Black Hawk Purchase. He settled in Jackson County and was elected to the Iowa Territory house of representatives for three one-year terms. In 1840, Cox led a posse against a group of outlaws in what would become known as the Bellevue War. Cox was elected to the state assembly as a councilman in 1842 and served one two-year term.

== Early life ==
Thomas Cox was born in Kentucky Territory, Virginia, in 1787 to Robert and Jane (Robinson) Cox. The Cox family moved to the Illinois Territory in the winter after its creation in 1809, settling in Kaskaskia. Cox assisted in taking the 1810 United States census and collected taxes, paid at the time in fur pelts. He was serving as Sheriff of Randolph County when he decided to join the militia.

Cox enlisted as a private in the 1st company, 2nd Regiment, Illinois Territory Militia in early, which served for three months. The company was dismissed a few days before the outbreak of the War of 1812. He again enlisted when a mounted brigade of 350 was formed to serve with Col. William Russell. This brigade was then split into three companies; Cox was part of the 21-man scouting company captained by Samuel Judy. Cox served alongside future Governor of Illinois John Reynolds. On March 24, 1813, he was promoted to Ensign; on June 8, the militia was discharged.

== War of 1812 and Illinois politics ==
The militia may have been incorporated into General Benjamin Howard's 2nd Regiment, though Cox's movements after the 1813 discharge are uncertain. Cox was promoted to a lieutenancy on April 19, 1814. On April 19, 1814, he was named captain of the 3rd Regiment of the Illinois Territory Militia. He was probably have been promoted to Lieutenant Colonel at some point, as some letters refer to him as "Colonel Cox" as early as 1820.

Cox returned to Illinois to find that his father had drowned during the war. To help support his family, Cox began to practice surveying. His work took him to New Madrid, Louisiana Territory, where he recorded changes from the 1811–12 New Madrid earthquakes. Cox became a land speculator, largely in what is now northeastern Arkansas and southeastern Missouri; this surveying knowledge gave him unique opportunities to acquire lands. When Union County, Illinois, was founded on April 8, 1818, Governor Ninian Edwards appointed Cox a justice of the peace. When the state was officially recognized that December, Cox was elected one of the first state senators, serving for two years.

Cox expanded his land speculation to central Illinois in 1821, including a home in the new Sangamon County. Governor Edwards recommended Cox as Register of the United States General Land Office in Springfield, which was approved by President James Monroe. He began work on January 28, 1823. Along with Elijah Iles, Daniel Pope Cook, and Pascal P. Enos, Cox platted the town of Springfield. Cox apparently opened a hotel in the town at some point, which was in operation by 1827, when Dr. John Todd succeeded Cox as Register. Cox's land speculations by this point had depreciated in value. Most of his property had to be sold to free himself from debt.

== Black Hawk War ==
In 1827, a tribe of Winnebago around Prairie du Chien, Michigan Territory, caused alarm for political leaders in Illinois. A regiment formed in the state in anticipation of battle, but Cox declined to serve because his relationship with Governor Edwards had been severed, as Cox had owed Edwards a large sum of money through his speculations. On May 8, 1832, Isaiah Stillman's company was attacked by the Winnebago at the Battle of Stillman's Run. This prompted new governor John Reynolds, who previously served with Cox, to raise six more companies of militia. Although Cox was old enough to be exempt from duty, Reynolds offered him the rank of colonel; however, Cox declined, perhaps due to his financial problems. In his place, he recommend his brother-in-law James Collins.

When a scouting company was raised in neighboring Morgan County, Cox decided to enlist. The company, under the leadership of William Lee D. Ewing, saw action in the Battle of Wisconsin Heights on July 21, 1832. They then pursued Black Hawk's band to the Mississippi River. Following the ensuing Battle of Bad Axe, the last engagement of the war, Cox was mustered out with the rest of his company on August 16, 1832.

== Iowa settlement ==
Upon his return to Illinois, he accepted an offer to join his brothers-in-law, Lemuel and William Bartlett, in an operation in Ste. Genevieve, Missouri. Soon after, however, Cox was appointed United States Deputy Surveyor to subdivide a portion of the Black Hawk Purchase in the Wisconsin Territory. Cox settled in White Oak Springs to be closer to his work. Cox surveyed ten townships in what is now Jackson County, Iowa, through the fall of 1837.

Many members of Cox's family came to the county while he surveyed it. His brother, John W. Cox, built the first sawmill in the county. Six brothers-in-law joined him, as well as his brother Enoch. Cox himself selected a site for a new home that summer on the north bank of the Maquoketa River on the road between Dubuque and Davenport. His immediate family joined him the next spring. Cox named his new farm and the surrounding area Richland.

== Iowa Territory politics ==
On July 4, 1838, the Iowa Territory was formed. Cox's political experience made him an ideal candidate for the new territorial legislature. Cox was elected to the first territorial assembly in the four-man house of representatives. Cox ended a dispute in the assembly regarding the capital of Iowa by suggesting that it be built in an entirely new city. Although initially rejected, the idea was later adapted and Cox chose the name "Iowa City". Cox was selected as one of the two surveyors commissioned to plat the town.

While Cox was in Iowa City, a caucus was held to nominate a candidate for the next assembly. Cox expected to be re-elected, even in his absence, but instead a Bellevue hotel-keeper named W. W. Brown secured the Democratic Party nomination. Cox returned home and announced that he would run as an independent. He accused Brown of connections with organized crime, members of which were known to frequent Brown's hotel. Cox was elected to the second assembly, which opened in November 1839.

When the session concluded in January 1840, Cox returned to Jackson County to find that it was being harassed by a gang of outlaws. When former Sangamon County colleague Ebenezer Brigham came to the county seeking a horse thief. Cox suspected James Thompson, a boarder in Brown's hotel. Probate Judge James K. Moss authorized Cox and sheriff Warren to organize a posse to apprehend Brown and Thompson's gang. After a parley between Brown and Warren broke down, Cox led the posse in an attack against the hotel. Brown surrendered, but as he was lowering his rifle, he accidentally discharged his weapon, which fired a bullet through Cox's coat. Two members of the posse thought that Brown was firing in anger and shot him dead. As fire continued to be exchanged between the posse and hotel residents, the hotel was set on fire. Thirteen fleeing outlaws were apprehended. In the ensuing trial, they were whipped and told not to return to the county; one member, William Fox, joined the Banditti of the Prairie. The jury also determined that the posse acted appropriately in the interests of the law in what became known as the Bellevue War.

The actions of the posse outraged some local politicians, who called for Cox's expulsion from the legislature. However, there is no record of any impeachment attempt made in the assembly; in fact, he was named Speaker of the House pro tempore for the opening of a special session that July. Cox was commissioned to plat Scotch Grove as the county seat of Jones County, but the residents did not built a courthouse. Cox was then sent to plat the nearby Lexington, now known as Anamosa, which became the seat.

In August 1840, he was re-elected to a third term in the territorial house. When the assembly gathered, Cox was elected Speaker of the House almost unanimously. He was then re-elected the next August, but declined the office for unknown reasons. James K. Moss, who fought with Cox in the Bellevue War, was elected in a special election in his place. In 1842, Cox vied as an independent for a seat on the territorial council, the higher legislative body. Cox defeated Francis Gehon and Hardin Nowlin for a two-year term. In his second year of service, the 6th assembly, Cox was elected President of the council after thirty-one ballots.

== Death and burial ==
In late 1844, Cox caught pneumonia. He died on November 9, 1844, from the disease and "liver congestion". Rev. William Salter of the Iowa Band officiated his funeral the next day. Cox was buried under a tree at his farm that he had previously identified as his final resting place. In 1904, the Jackson County Historical Society moved his remains to Mount Hope Cemetery in Maquoketa, Iowa. A granite boulder from his farm was also moved the cemetery as a monument to Cox on July 4, 1905.
