= George Greene (judge) =

American judge

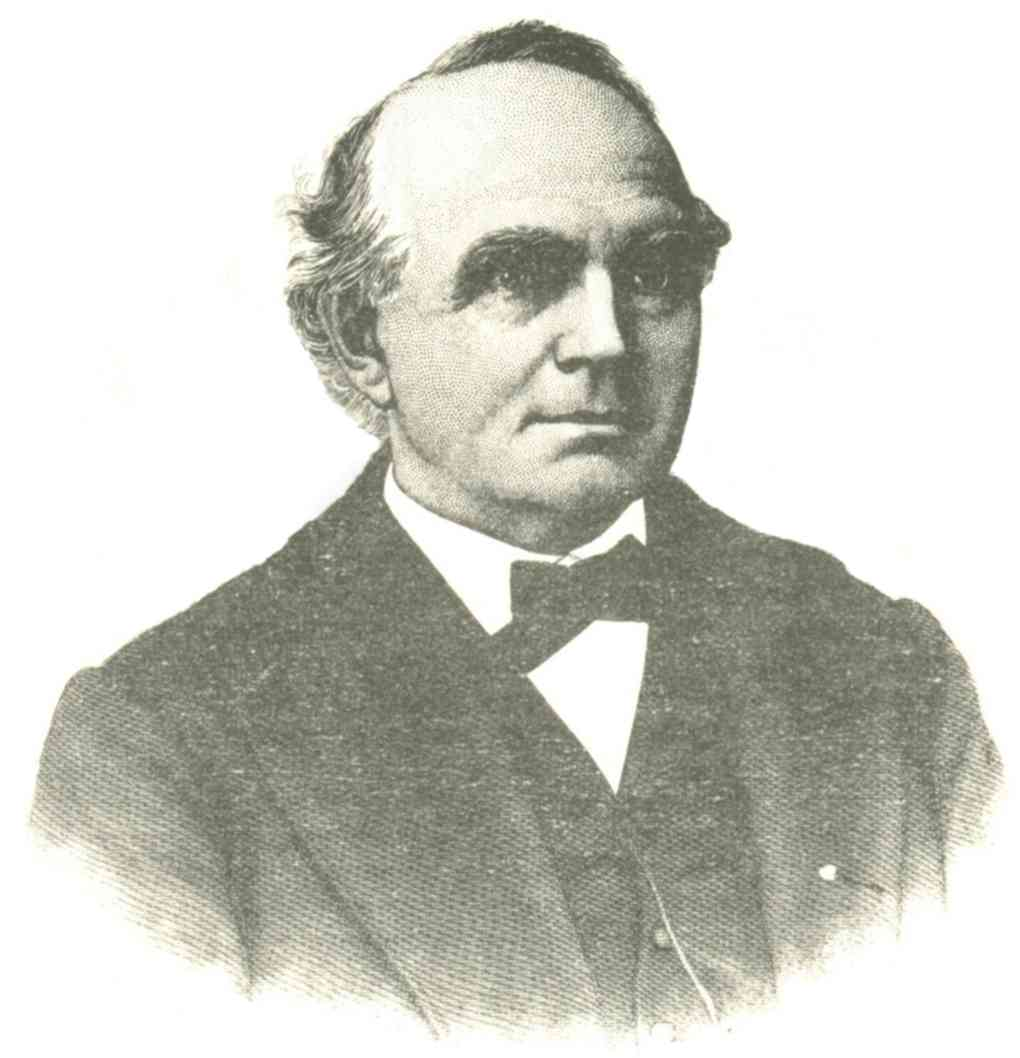

Justice of the Iowa Supreme Court
- In office November 1, 1847 – January 9, 1855
- Preceded by: Thomas Stokeley Wilson
- Succeeded by: William G. Woodward

Personal details
- Born: April 15, 1817 Alton, Staffordshire, England
- Died: June 23, 1880 Cedar Rapids, Iowa
- Party: Democrat until 1872; Republican after 1872
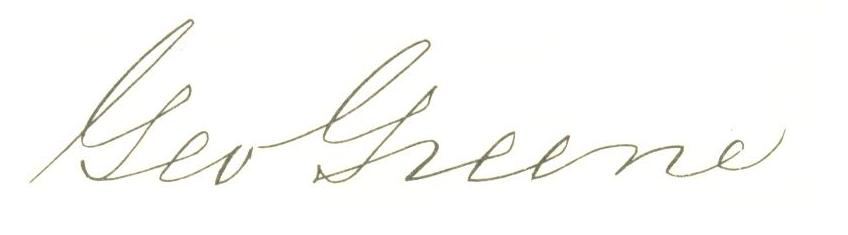
- Signature

George Greene (April 15, 1817 – June 23, 1880) was a lawyer, justice of the Iowa Supreme Court, railroad entrepreneur, businessman, philanthropist, and one of the founders of Cedar Rapids, Iowa.

== Early life ==
Greene was born in Alton, Staffordshire, England on April 15, 1817 to Robert Greene and Sefer Woodward. His parents were natives of Staffordshire, as were his two younger brothers William and Joseph. The family moved to the United States when he was two years old. They settled in Buffalo, New York. His father died in 1825, and his mother returned to England by herself, in hope of obtaining some property that she believed owned to her. She died in England in 1827 and George, at the age of 10, became an orphan with his brothers. During the next four years he had to provide for himself and his younger brothers. Then he attempted to return to England to recover the property his mother failed to secure. He had to work for his passage to England, and find employment once he got there. He did not reclaim the property and had to work for his passage back to the United States. When he returned, he decided that he would focus on his education, hoping that it would help him gain what he could not through inheritance. He studied one year at Carysville Collegiate Seminary, a year at Aurora Seminary, and two years at French's Collegiate Institute in Geneva, New York. During these four years he taught school as well, and did any other work he could find. He then took up the study of law, with the intention of making it his life profession. He studied with the Hon. George P. Baker in Buffalo, New York. He assisted in Baker's office and was bookkeeper for Dr. Chapin—whom he lived with—to meet his expenses during that time.

== Career ==
In the spring of 1838, Greene moved to the Territory of Iowa. In Davenport, Iowa he was employed by David J. Owen, who was making a geological survey of the territory. He spent six months surveying, which helped him gain a better knowledge of the lands. After this, he moved to Ivanhoe, Iowa and taught school while continuing his law studies. In 1840, he was admitted to the bar in Iowa City, Iowa. He moved to Marion, Iowa, and began practicing law. That year, he was chosen to represent Cedar, Jones, and Linn counties in the Council of the Third Legislative Assembly as a Democrat. He was re-elected to the following year to the Fourth Legislative Assembly. In 1845, he moved to Dubuque, Iowa, and became the editor of the Miners' Express. In Dubuque he began practicing law again, this time in partnership with J. J. Dyer.

Greene's law practice was so successful that he was appointed to be a justice of the Iowa Supreme Court in 1847, to fill the vacancy left by Justice Thomas Stokeley Wilson. He served from November 1, 1847 to January 9, 1855. He was also the reporter of the Supreme Court, so he compiled the decisions of the court in the four-volume G. Greene Reports. In 1849, he became one of the founders of Cedar Rapids, Iowa by surveying and laying out the site of the town. He began living in Cedar Rapids in 1851. He also contributed to the financial development of the city. During the Panic of 1857 he was connected with the management of nine banks in the city.

In 1859, Greene formed a law partnership with Cyrus Bently in Chicago, Illinois. He practiced law and lived there for five years. In the winter of 1864 he moved to McGregor, Iowa and helped his brothers build the McGregor Western Railroad. During this time, and several years later, he helped build the Rockford, Rock Island & St. Louis Railroad. He returned to Cedar Rapids after this, and began practicing law with Judge Dudley and his son-in-law A. S. Belt. The firm represented the Chicago & Northwestern Railroad. Greene continued to be involved with railroads, and became president of the Burlington, Cedar Rapids & Minnesota Railroad, which he took an active part in building. When the railroad went bankrupt it was purchased and operated under the name Burlington, Cedar Rapids & Northern Railroad. He constructed several smaller railroads in Iowa, Illinois, Minnesota, Missouri, and Kansas.

In addition to being a successful lawyer and business man, Greene founded the Grace Episcopal Church, donated the grounds for the church and rectory, and also served as the warden of it. He served as president of the board of trustees of Coe Collegiate Institute, which was later renamed Coe College. In 1872, he changed his party affiliation from Democrat to Republican. Greene was also a Mason and was first Past Master of Crescent Lodge #25, Cedar Rapids (1851–52). In 1870 he along with a few others are credited with the founding of Mount Hermon Lodge No. 263 in Cedar Rapids, IA. He died in his home in Cedar Rapids, Iowa on June 23, 1880, and is buried at Oak Hill Cemetery.

== Placenames ==
- Greene Square Park, Cedar Rapids, Iowa
- Greene's Opera House, Cedar Rapids, Iowa
- Greene Brothers’ Store, town's first major department store, Cedar Rapids, Iowa
- Greene Residence Hall at Coe College, Coe's first Board President, Cedar Rapids, Iowa
- Greene mansion, now part of Mount Mercy College, Cedar Rapids, Iowa
- Greene Avenue NE, between I and J Avenue NE Cedar Rapids, Iowa
- Greene, Iowa

== Family ==
On May 30, 1838, Greene married Harriet Merritt. Harriet was from Buffalo, New York and was the daughter of Jesse Merritt and Harriet Hilton. They had four children: George W. (b. April 4, 1839), Susan H. (b. March 3, 1841), Mary Ely (b. June 7, 1843), and Edward Merritt (b. March 29, 1845). George W. and Mary Ely died as infants. Harriet died in Dubuque on April 25, 1850; Greene remarried on January 25, 1855 to Frances R. Graves, who was from Cooperstown, New York. Her parents were Clavin Graves and Fanny Carlisle. They had eight children: Calvin G. (b. February 18, 1856), Fanny C. (b. January 19, 1858), George (b. December 28, 1859), William J. (b. November 28, 1861), Elizabeth (b. August 13, 1864), Robert C. (b. December 22, 1867), Francis (b. May 14, 1870), and Woodward K. (b. August 2, 1873).

== Notes ==
Legal offices
Preceded by Thomas Stokeley Wilson	2nd Associate Justice of the Iowa Supreme Court; November 1, 1847 – January 9, 1855	Succeeded by William G. Woodward
