= Charles Whittlesey (politician) =

American politician (1807–1863)

Charles Whittlesey (3 November 1807 – 17 January 1863) was an American politician.

Whittlesey, a farmer, was born in New York City on 3 November 1807. He married Mary Tuthill in New York on his thirtieth birthday. Whittlesey then moved to Cedar County, Iowa, and served on the Iowa Legislative Assembly from 12 November 1838 to 1 November 1840. He was affiliated with the Whig Party and represented Iowa Council District 6. In later life, Whittlesey returned to New York, where he died on 17 January 1863.
