= William Abbe =

Iowa state senator

- Born: ~1800; Ohio, U.S.
- Died: 1854; Sacramento, California, U.S.
- Known for: First white settler in Linn County, Iowa; Iowa state senator

William Abbe (c. 1800–1854) served on the Iowa Council and is believed to have been the first white settler in Linn County, Iowa. Originally from Ohio, he traveled west in search of land in 1836. Little is known about Abbe until this time. Abbe Creek, on which he established his homestead, still bears his name today. A one-room school house was established on the homestead site in 1856 and still stands today bearing the name of Abbe Creek School. He died in 1854 in California and was buried in Sacramento.

== Life ==
=== Settlement and homesteading ===
Abbe came to eastern Iowa by way of Rock Island, Illinois, in the summer of 1836. He followed the Red Cedar River to the site of the present town of Mt. Vernon, Iowa and staked a claim of 400 acres (1.6 km^{2}) on what is now known as Abbe Creek.

He returned to his home in Lorain County, Ohio, to collect his family and they returned to Iowa in the winter of 1837. The Abbe family crossed the Mississippi River on the ice near Davenport in February to avoid the high tariff charged by Col. Davenport and other river ferrymen. Ferry charges were as high as $25 for a man and his horse. Abbe reached his staked claim in April and immediately cleared the land around the creek with a team of oxen and a breaking plow to cut the prairie sod. Then, Abbe built a floorless cabin 12 by 14 feet (4.3 m). He covered the cabin with birch bark. Later that fall he built a large double log house with three rooms and an upstairs sleeping loft reached by an inside ladder.

Two years after Abbe and his wife, Olive, homesteaded the land, Olive died. She was buried in an unmarked grave near their farm. This area later became Sugar Grove cemetery. In 1840 Abbe married Mary Wolcott.

In 1838, Abbe sent two other early settlers, Robert Ellis and Philip Hull, to Muscatine (a trek of over 50 miles by a recent Google Maps directions) for provisions with his last $15. Muscatine, Davenport and Rockingham were the closest trading posts and provisions were expensive.

The first two years Abbe hunted and traded with the Indians and spoke the Winnebago language. Later he acted as interpreter for them in dealings with white settlers and trappers. Abbe's children also played with the Winnebagos and spoke the language as well as the Indians.

=== Social life ===
Physically, Abbe was a big man who stood more than six feet tall. He was slender and stood straight as an arrow. According to his son, "I never saw a horse he could not mount and ride anytime without the least effort." He was very active and often walked 50 miles (80 km) in one day through the unbroken prairies and forests.

William Abbe's cabin was a popular gathering place for the settlers and immigrants of early Linn County. It was the major stop between Iowa City and Dubuque on the old Military Road. Strangers could always find a good meal and a place to stay with William and Mary Abbe. Mrs. Abbe was known for her good cooking and many people would travel out of their way to stop at their cabin. Their daughter, Susan Abbe, became the first teacher in Cedar Rapids. Telling of their pioneer life, she recalled: "Of course we had men come in such as horse thieves, and my father had some of them chained up in one of our rooms for safekeeping until they could be tried, as there was no jail for some time in Linn County."

=== Politics ===
Abbe was one of the best known and educated men in the county. He was an old time Democrat and served in the Iowa Council representing Cedar, Linn and Jones counties in the 7th and 8th Iowa Legislative Assemblies. He was a Justice of the Peace and later served a short time as sheriff of the county. He helped build the first jail in Marion.

Abbe also held the government contracts for the delivery of meat and provisions to the Winnebago Agency at Fort Atkinson and to the troops at Prairie du Chien in Wisconsin. For many years, he was the only person in the county who had a ready supply of money and he loaned it freely to his friends for them to purchase claims.

=== Goldrush ===
When gold was discovered in California, Abbe left his family in 1849 for the gold fields where he was a land speculator and teamster. He came back to Iowa in 1851, but left again for California with his son the next year. In 1854, before he could return to Iowa to bring his family to California, Abbe died at age 54. He was buried in Sacramento. His widow, Mary, continued to live in Marion until her death in 1861.
