= Mortimer Phillips Bainbridge =

American politician (1808–1857)

Mortimer Phillips Bainbridge (10 November 1808 – 15 July 1857) was an American politician.

Bainbridge was a lawyer born in Louisville, Kentucky, on 10 November 1808. He later moved to Iowa Territory, where, on 22 July 1839, he married Elizabeth Sarah Ann Graham Hooe at Fort Snelling. Bainbridge was elected to the Iowa Legislative Assembly as a Whig from Dubuque County between 1840 and 1842. He was president of the Iowa Council and held the District 10 seat. After the Whig Party dissolved, Bainbridge joined the Democratic Party. He died in King George County, Virginia on 15 July 1857.

Bainbridge's son Absalom Ruggles Bainbridge (1847–1902) served in the Confederate army during the Civil War; while heading home after being demobilized, he and his cousin Mortimer Ruggles encountered fugitive John Wilkes Booth on April 24, 1865, and aided him in crossing the Rappahannock River; they also warned him the next day of Union soldiers in the area. Bainbridge and Ruggles were arrested and imprisoned, but eventually released after taking an oath of allegiance.
