= Enoch Ross =

American politician

Enoch Ross (10 March 1808 – 24 February 1888) was an American politician.

Enoch Ross was born in Greene County, Pennsylvania, on 10 March 1808 and trained as a mechanic. He later moved to Iowa and married Sarah McClure. Ross, a Whig, was elected a delegate of Washington County to the 1844 Iowa constitutional convention convened in Iowa City. After serving on the constitutional convention, Ross served on the Iowa Legislative Assembly, representing Iowa Council District 6 from 1845 to 1846. He died on 24 February 1888.
