= E. A. M. Swazy =

American politician (1809–1862)

E. A. M. Swazy (1809–1862) was an American politician.

Swazy was born in Vermont in 1809 and married Phoebe Stoddard. He served in the legislature of Iowa Territory from 1838 to 1840, representing Van Buren County as a Democrat from District 4 of the Iowa Council. Outside of politics, Swazy was engaged in farming and the practice of law. He died in Farmington, Iowa, in 1862.
