= William H. Wallace =

4th Territorial Governor of Washington

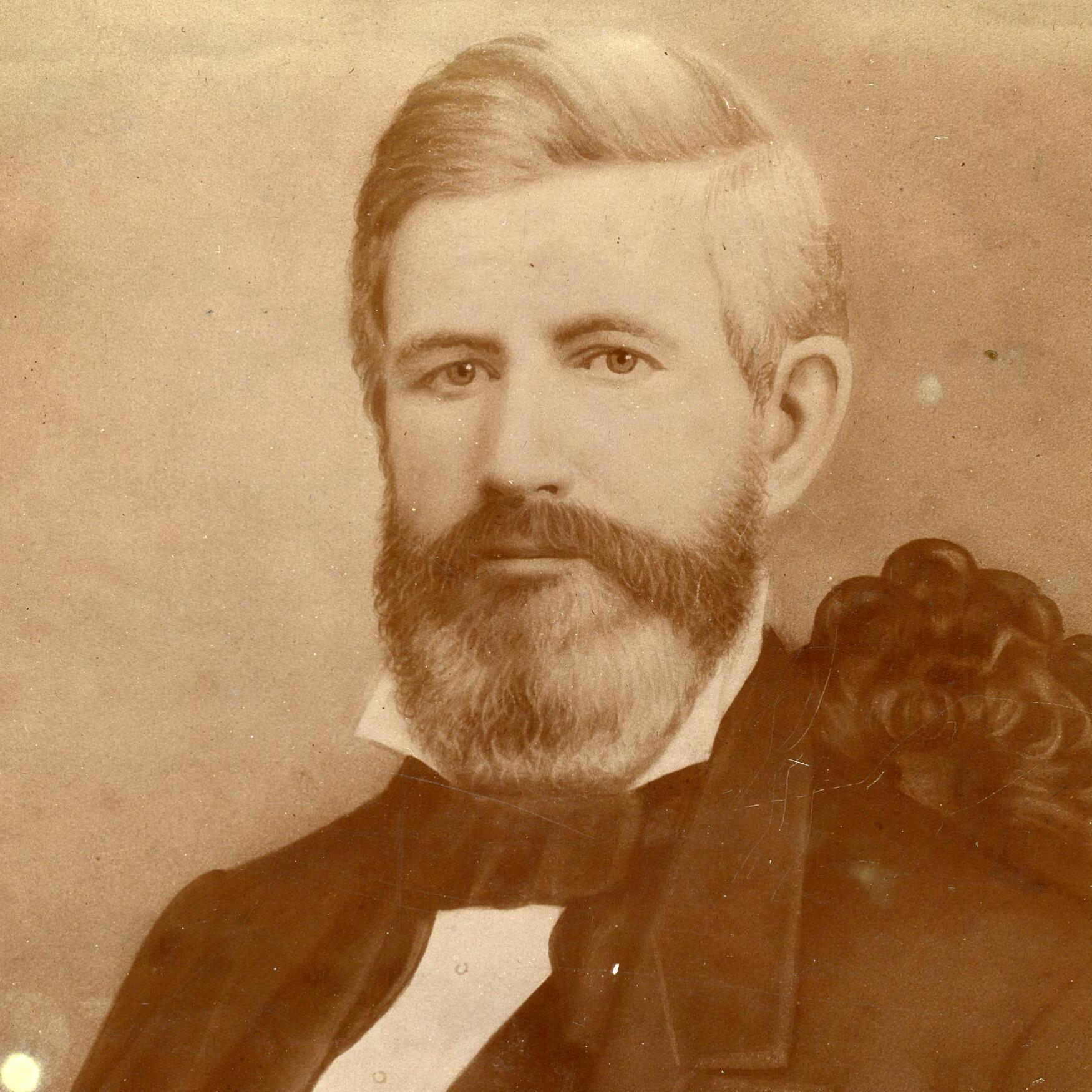
- Wallace c. 1850-1870

Delegate to the U.S. House of Representatives from Idaho Territory's at-large district
- In office February 1, 1864 – March 3, 1865
- Preceded by: District created
- Succeeded by: Edward Dexter Holbrook

1st Governor of Idaho Territory
- In office March 10, 1863 – February 1, 1864
- Preceded by: Office established
- Succeeded by: Caleb Lyon

Delegate to the U.S. House of Representatives from Washington Territory's at-large district
- In office March 4, 1861 – March 3, 1863
- Preceded by: Isaac Stevens
- Succeeded by: George E. Cole

4th Governor of Washington Territory
- In office April 9, 1861 – 1861
- Preceded by: Richard D. Gholson
- Succeeded by: William Pickering

Member of the Iowa Council from Henry County
- In office 1840–1845
- Preceded by: Jesse D. Payne
- Succeeded by: John Stephenson

Speaker of the Iowa House of Representatives
- In office 1838–1839
- Preceded by: Office established
- Succeeded by: Edward Johnstone

Member of the Iowa House of Representatives from Henry County
- In office 1838–1839
- Preceded by: District created
- Succeeded by: John B. Lash

Personal details
- Born: William Henson Wallace; July 19, 1811 Troy, Ohio
- Died: February 7, 1879 (aged 67) Steilacoom, Washington Territory
- Party: Republican
- Other political affiliations: Whig
- Spouse: Luzanne Brazelton
- Profession: Attorney

William Henson Wallace (July 19, 1811 – February 7, 1879) was an American lawyer and politician who was an important figure in the early histories of two U.S. states, serving as governor and congressional delegate from both Washington Territory and Idaho Territory.

== Biography ==
Wallace was born July 19, 1811, near Troy, Ohio. He attended in the common schools of Indiana, studied law, was admitted to the bar and began practicing law. He married Luzanne Brazelton and had three children, two girls who died in infancy and one son. Wallace's older brother David Wallace served as a Whig Governor of Indiana from 1837 to 1840. Wallace's nephew was Lew Wallace, a Civil War Union general and the author of Ben-Hur.

== Career ==
After being admitted to the bar, Wallace moved to the Iowa District of Wisconsin Territory in 1837. He was elected to the Iowa Territorial Legislature as a Whig after Iowa Territory was organized the following year. Despite a Democratic majority in the body, Wallace secured eleven of twenty votes for the speakership. Wallace was appointed colonel of state troops and receiver of public money at Fairfield. Wallace ran an unsuccessful campaign for delegate from Iowa Territory in 1843. In 1848, he was a candidate for United States Senate from the new State of Iowa, but the Iowa Legislature instead selected Democrats George Wallace Jones and Augustus C. Dodge. Wallace moved to Washington Territory in 1853. Sometime during the early 1850s, he befriended Abraham Lincoln and they remained good friends until Lincoln's death.

In 1861, Wallace was appointed governor of Washington Territory by President Lincoln, but was also elected the territory's delegate to the United States House of Representatives and never took office as governor. He was the first Republican chosen for those roles in Washington Territory. Wallace served a single term representing Washington Territory in the House. During his term, he got Congress to establish Idaho as a territory. Shortly after his term expired in March 1863, Lincoln appointed Wallace governor of the new Idaho Territory and he took office July 10, 1863.

Wallace designated Lewiston as the territory's capital and arrived there in July. Later that year, Wallace was elected as the delegate from Idaho Territory and again vacated his gubernatorial appointment to serve in the House.

Wallace is reported to have been one of several people who turned down an invitation from Lincoln to accompany him to Ford's Theatre on the night Lincoln was assassinated.

== Death ==
After his term expired in March 1865, Wallace returned to Washington Territory where he served as a probate judge in Pierce County until his death in 1879. Wallace is buried in Fort Steilacoom Cemetery, Steilacoom, Pierce County, Washington, United States.

U.S. House of Representatives
| Preceded by Isaac I. Stevens | Delegate to the U.S. House of Representatives from Washington; 1861–1863 | Succeeded by George E. Cole |
| Preceded by office created | Delegate to the U.S. House of Representatives from Idaho; 1864–1865 | Succeeded by Edward D. Holbrook |
Political offices
| Preceded by Richard D. Gholson | Territorial Governor of Washington; 1861 | Succeeded by William Pickering |
| Preceded by office created | Territorial Governor of Idaho; 1863–1864 | Succeeded by Caleb Lyon |
