= Francis Gehon =

American politician

Delegate-elect to the U.S. House of Representatives from the Iowa Territory's at-large district
- In office Not seated
- Preceded by: William W. Chapman
- Succeeded by: Augustus C. Dodge

Personal details
- Born: 1797 Tennessee, U.S.
- Died: April 2, 1849 (aged 51–52) Dubuque, Iowa, U.S.
- Party: Democratic

Francis Gehon (1797 – April 2, 1849) was an American politician from Iowa.

== Biography ==
Born in Tennessee in 1797, Gehon lived in Kentucky and Illinois during his early years. He operated a trading post in Helena, Arkansas before moving to Dodgeville, Wisconsin. He served as a United States Marshal in Wisconsin. He commanded a militia company in Wisconsin (then part of Michigan Territory) during the Black Hawk War. He later settled in Peru, Iowa, where he managed a store.

== Career ==
A Democrat, Gehon served on the Dubuque County Board of Supervisors. He also served as a United States Marshal for Iowa and served in the Iowa Militia as brigadier general in command of the 2nd Brigade.

In 1839, Gehon was elected the delegate from Iowa Territory to the United States House of Representatives, but never took office. The United States Congress extended the term of William W. Chapman to bring the term of office in line with the rest of the United States House of Representatives. In 1843, Gehon was elected to the Iowa Territorial Council and in 1844, he was elected to the first Iowa Constitutional Convention.

Gehon was offered command of a company of dragoons raised for the Mexican–American War, but declined because of ill health.

He died suddenly in Dubuque, Iowa on April 2, 1849; the cause of death was given as "congestion of the brain.

== See also ==
- List of United States representatives-elect who never took their seats

U.S. House of Representatives
Preceded by William W. Chapman	Delegate-elect to the U.S. House of Representatives from the Iowa Territory's at-large congressional district 1839–1840	Succeeded by Augustus C. Dodge
