= Iowa Legislative Assembly =

Legislature of the Territory of Iowa, 1838-1846

The Territory of Iowa Legislative Assembly or Legislative Assembly of Iowa Territory was the legislature of Iowa Territory, which operated between the creation of the territory in 1838 and statehood in 1846.

Like that of Wisconsin Territory (from which Iowa had been split when Wisconsin became a state), the Assembly consisted of an upper house, called the Council (although some historical compilations refer to it as the Senate), led by a President; and a lower house, the House of Representatives, led by a Speaker of the House. The Council had 13 members, the House had 26. The term of members of the Council was changed from four years in 1836 to two years in 1838, and the term of Representatives was changed from two years in 1836 to one year in 1838.

The Assembly held eight regular sessions and two special sessions of varying length, the first beginning on November 12, 1838 and the last ending on January 19, 1846. Legislative Assemblies 1 through 3 convened in Burlington and 4 through 8 convened in Iowa City.

Throughout the Assembly's duration, members of the Democratic Party held an absolute majority of varying extent in both houses.
