= Shepherd Leffler =

American politician (1811–1879)

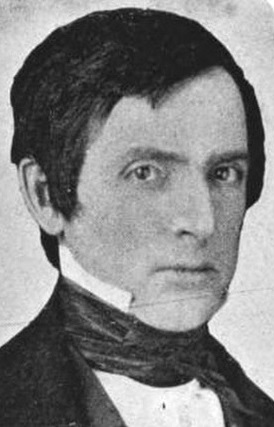

Member of the U.S. House of Representatives from Iowa
- In office December 28, 1846 – March 3, 1851
- Preceded by: District established
- Succeeded by: District eliminated (AL); Lincoln Clark (2nd)
- Constituency: At-large district (1846-47); 2nd district (1847-51)

Personal details
- Born: April 24, 1811 Washington County, Pennsylvania, U.S.
- Died: September 7, 1879 (aged 68) Burlington, Iowa, U.S
- Party: Democratic
- Relatives: Isaac Leffler (brother)
- Education: Washington & Jefferson College

Shepherd Leffler (April 24, 1811 – September 7, 1879) was one of the two original U.S. representatives to represent Iowa when the state was first admitted to the Union. Elected as a Democrat in 1846, Leffler went on to represent Iowa's 2nd congressional district in the U.S. House for additional terms.

== Early life and education ==
Leffler was born on his grandfather's plantation, "Sylvia's Plain," in Washington County, Pennsylvania, near Wheeling, Virginia (now West Virginia). He attended private schools and graduated from Washington College in Washington, Pennsylvania, and from the law department of Jefferson College (now Washington & Jefferson College), in Canonsburg, Pennsylvania, in 1833. He was admitted to the bar and commenced practice in Wheeling.

In 1835 he moved to what is now Burlington, Iowa (then a part of Michigan Territory, the next year a part of Wisconsin Territory, and the next year the initial capital of Iowa Territory). He served as member of the Iowa Territory's House of Representatives in 1839 and 1841, and on its Territorial Council from 1841 to 1843 and again in 1845.

He was the brother of Virginia Congressman Isaac Leffler.

== U.S. Congress ==
As statehood approached, he served as the permanent president of the Iowa constitutional convention in 1844, and a member in the second convention in 1846. Upon the admission of Iowa as a state on December 28, 1846, he was elected as a Democrat to serve as one of two at-large Congressmen for the last two months of the Twenty-ninth Congress. He had also been elected to represent Iowa's 2nd congressional district in the Thirtieth Congress from 1847 to early 1849. In 1848, he defeated Whig (and future Republican) candidate Timothy Davis, then served in the Thirty-first Congress. He served as chairman of the Committee on Invalid Pensions in the Thirty-first Congress. In all, he served in Congress from December 28, 1846, to March 3, 1851.

== Career after Congress ==
After his last term ended, he resumed the practice of law in Burlington, and farmed. In 1856 he attempted to regain his seat, running as a Democrat in a year in which Democrat James Buchanan was elected president. However, Iowans defied the national trend and voted overwhelmingly for Republican candidates, including Leffler's opponent, Timothy Davis, reversing the outcome of their 1848 race. He was an unsuccessful Democratic candidate for Governor of Iowa in 1875, losing to another Iowa pioneer, Samuel J. Kirkwood.

== Death ==
Leffler died at his home, "Flint Hills," near Burlington, on September 7, 1879. He was interred in Aspen Grove Cemetery.

Party political offices
Preceded by Jacob G. Vale	Democratic nominee Governor of Iowa; 1875	Succeeded by John P. Irish
U.S. House of Representatives
New district	Member of the U.S. House of Representatives from Iowa's at-large congressional district December 29, 1846 – March 3, 1847	District eliminated
Preceded by District created	Member of the U.S. House of Representatives from Iowa's 2nd congressional district March 4, 1847 – March 3, 1851	Succeeded by Lincoln Clark
