= William G. Coop =

American politician from Iowa (1805–1874)

William Greyer Coop (February 26, 1805 – June 4, 1874) was an American farmer and settler from Illinois and Iowa, who served as a colonel of the militia, a sheriff and a member of the legislatures of Iowa Territory and the State of Iowa. He was born in Greene County, Virginia, and successively lived in Tennessee, Washington County, Pennsylvania, Wabash County, Indiana, and Macoupin County, Illinois, where he was county sheriff, before moving to Iowa.
