= Nellie Walker =

American sculptor

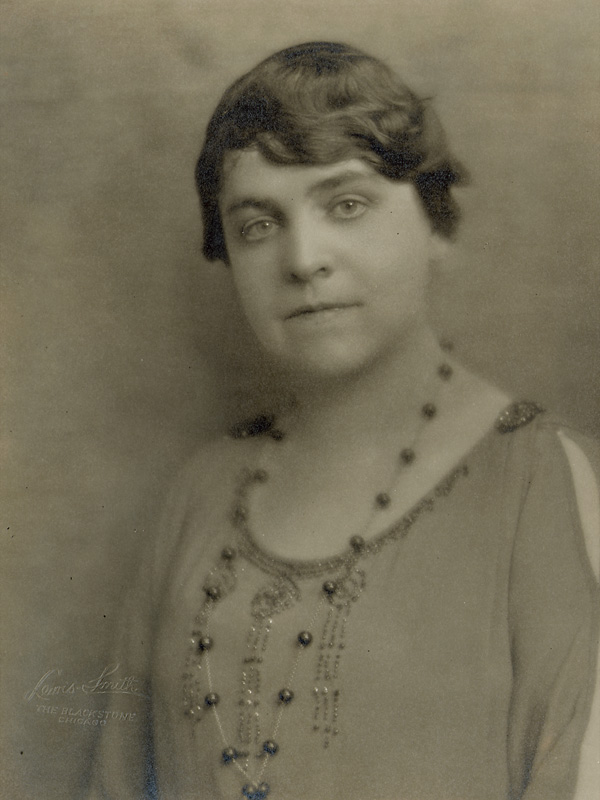
- Born: December 8, 1874; Red Oak, Iowa
- Died: July 10, 1973 (aged 98); Colorado Springs, Colorado
- Known for: Sculpture

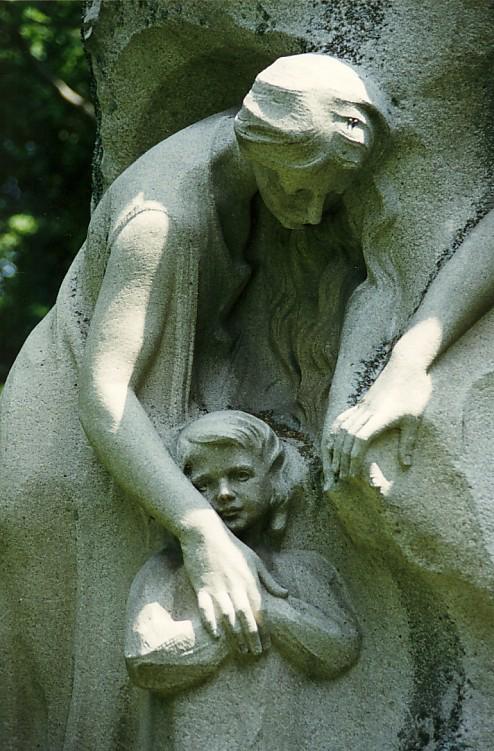
Mitchell family marker, Cadillac, Michigan

Nellie Verne Walker (December 8, 1874 – July 10, 1973), was an American sculptor best known for her statue of James Harlan formerly in the National Statuary Hall Collection in the United States Capitol, Washington D.C.

== Early years ==
Nellie Verne Walker was born in Red Oak, Iowa, the daughter of Everett Walker, a stone carver and monument maker, and Rebecca Jane Lindsay Walker. By the age of 17 she was allowed to use her father's tools and began making her own sculpture in her father's monument shop in Moulton, Iowa. Her first noteworthy work was a bust of Abraham Lincoln that was displayed at the Columbian Exposition in 1893, as an exhibit in the Iowa Building there, labeled "The work of an Iowa Girl". She was to return to the theme of Lincoln again in her career. Unable to afford to go to art school, Walker worked as a legal secretary for six years before she could obtain enough money to attend the Art Institute of Chicago.

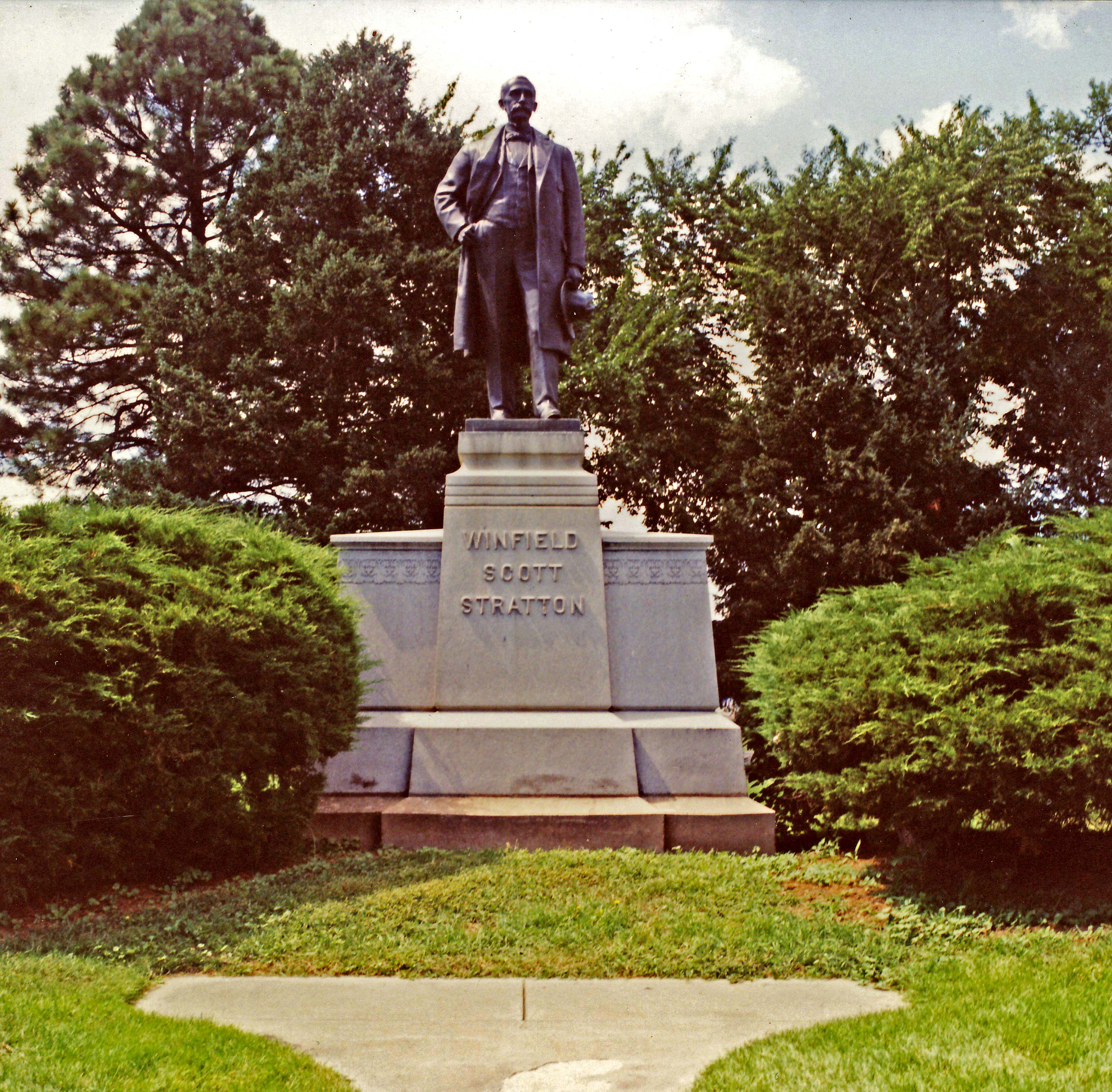
Stratton memorial

At four foot eight (4'8") and less than a hundred pounds she seemed an unlikely candidate to be able to meet and to succeed at the very physical demands placed on a sculptor, but the teacher, Lorado Taft decided to give her a chance and they were to remain friends and co-workers for the rest of their lives. Ultimately, because of her diminutive size and her work, she became known as "the lady who lived on ladders." When Taft died in 1936, leaving much of the Heald Square Monument – a sculpture group of George Washington, Robert Morris and Haym Salomon – undone, she was one of several sculptors who were commissioned to finish the piece (1941). Not long thereafter she began getting her own commissions and so moved into studio space in the famous (in sculpture circles) Midway Studio where she shared space with Taft and other Chicago sculptors. In 1902, reclusive Colorado Springs millionaire W. S. Stratton died and someone there realized that Walker was in town and asked her to make a death mask, which she did. The family was so impressed with Walker that they commissioned her to do a bust, followed by a large carved granite cemetery marker and finally an over-life-sized statue of Stratton.

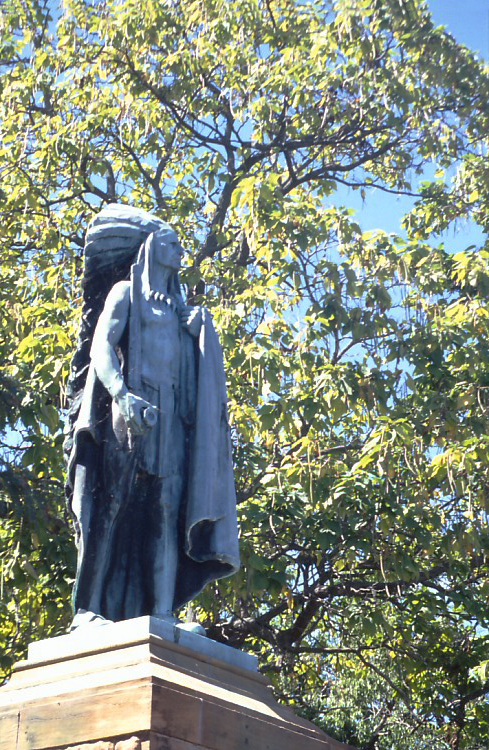
Chief Keokuk

All are still located in the Colorado Springs area.

Lorado Taft, in his groundbreaking The History of American Sculpture mentions Walker as a significant young sculptor and specifically refers to her Chief Keokuk statue. Like many other sculptors of her era Walker created both architectural and cemetery sculpture. She was a member of the National Sculpture Society and was inducted into the Iowa Women's Hall of Fame in 1987. Late in life, following the 1948 destruction of her Chicago studio, Walker moved to Colorado Springs, Colorado where she occasionally modeled pottery for the Van Briggle Pottery company, and she died there in 1973, aged 98.

== Monuments ==
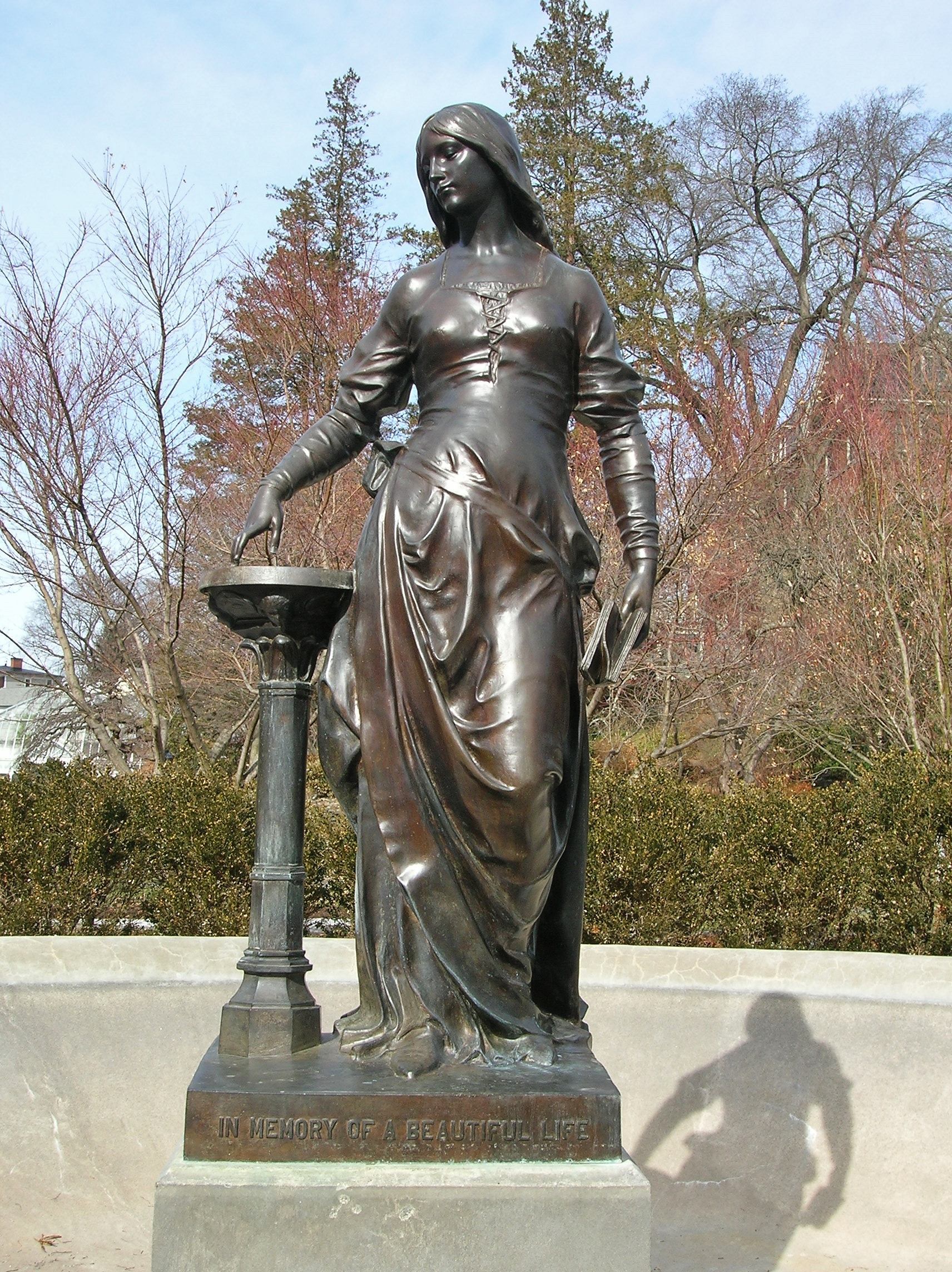
Lanning Fountain

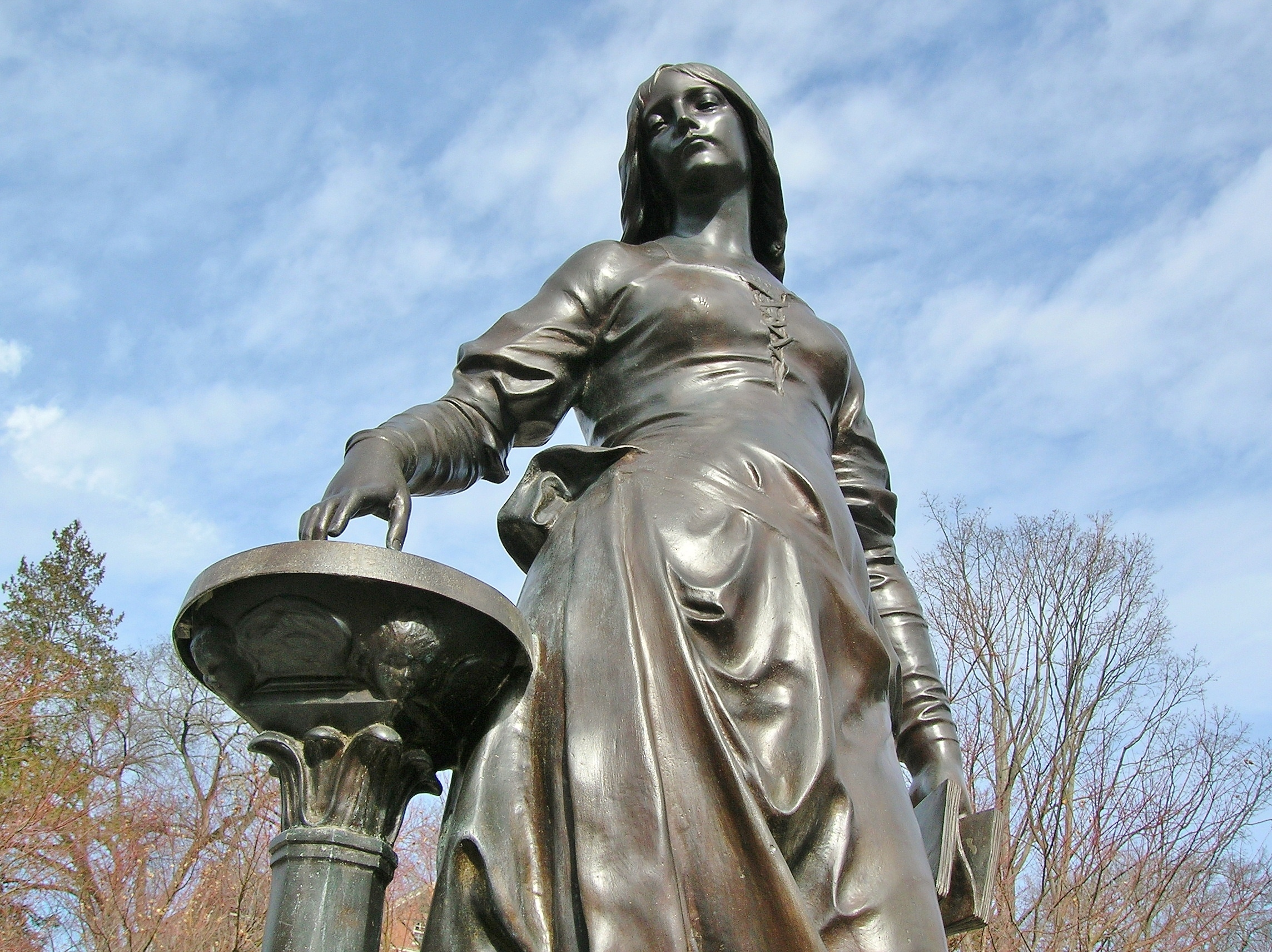
Lanning Fountain (looking up)

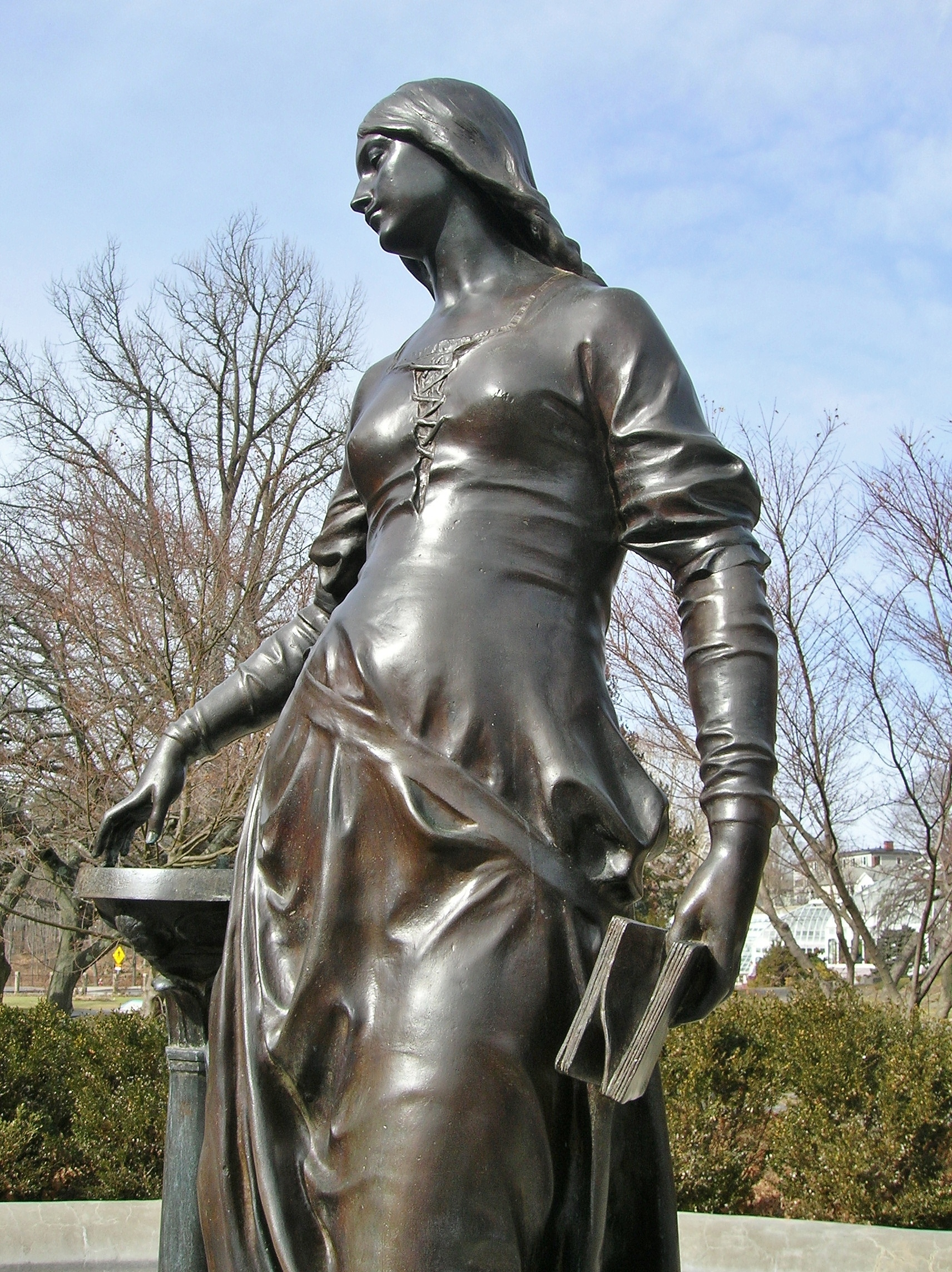
Lanning Fountain (profile)
- Winfield Scott Stratton, (1907), Colorado Springs, Colorado
- Statue of James Harlan, (1909), formerly in the National Statuary Hall Collection, Washington D.C.
- Lanning Fountain, (1911), Smith College, Northampton, Massachusetts
- Chief Keokuk, (1913), Keokuk, Iowa,
- Senator Isaac Stephenson, (1921), Marinette, Wisconsin
- Memorial to Soldiers of the War of 1812, (1929), Springfield, Illinois
- Suffrage Memorial Panel, (1934), Iowa State Capitol, Des Moines, Iowa
- Lincoln Trail State Memorial, (1937), near Lawrenceville, Illinois
- Haym Salomon figure for the Heald Square Monument, (1941), Chicago, Illinois

== Architectural sculpture ==
- figures of Friendship and Character, (1929) Michigan League Building, Ann Arbor, Michigan
- Monumental figures of Moses and Socrates for the courthouse in Jackson, Mississippi
- Panels, Iowa State University Library, Ames, Iowa
- Royal Neighbors Building, (1927) Rock Island, Illinois
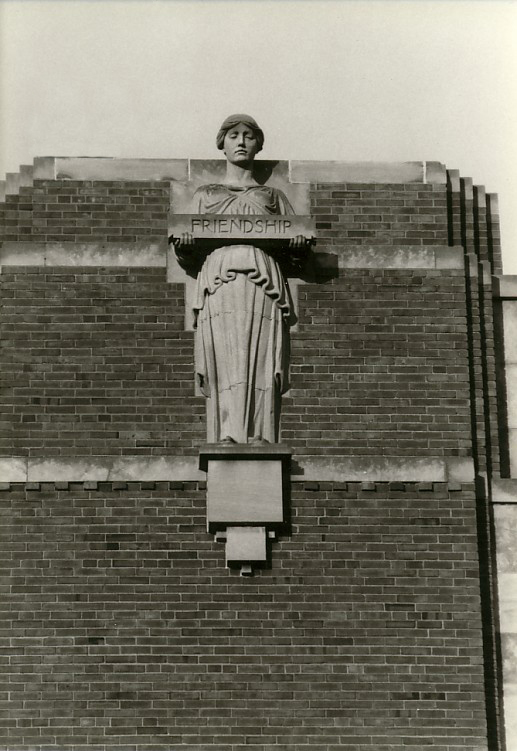
Michigan League Building

== Cemetery works ==
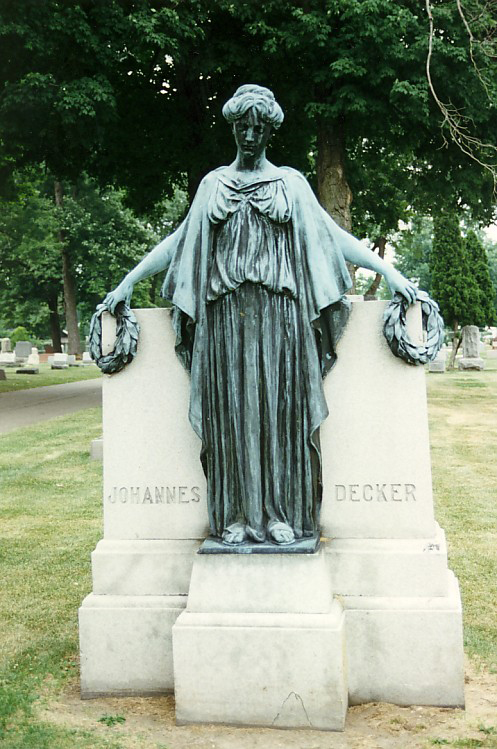
Decker Memorial

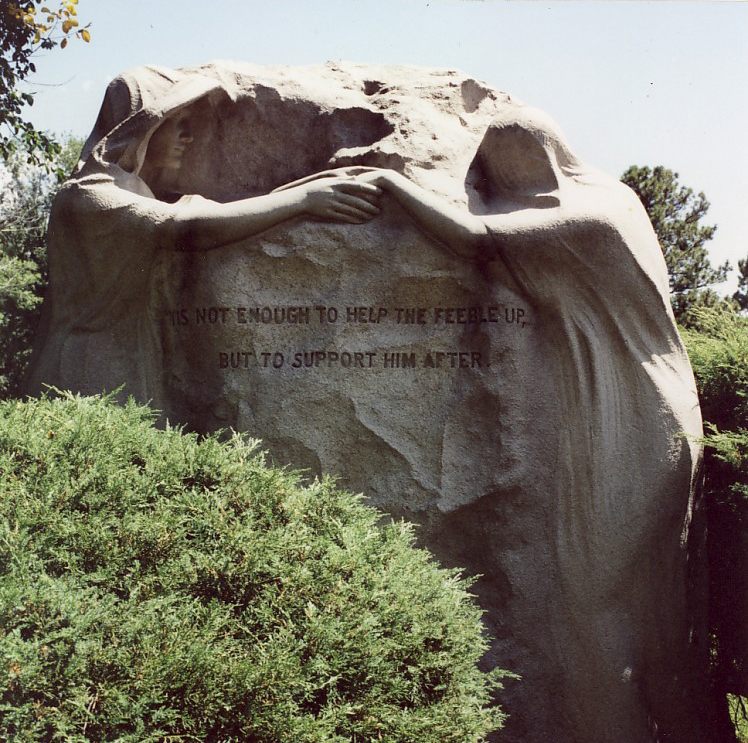
Stratton grave site

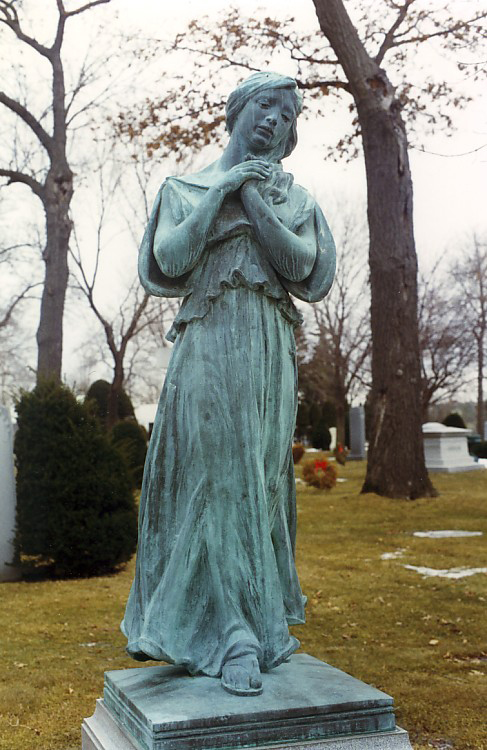
Helen McMullen

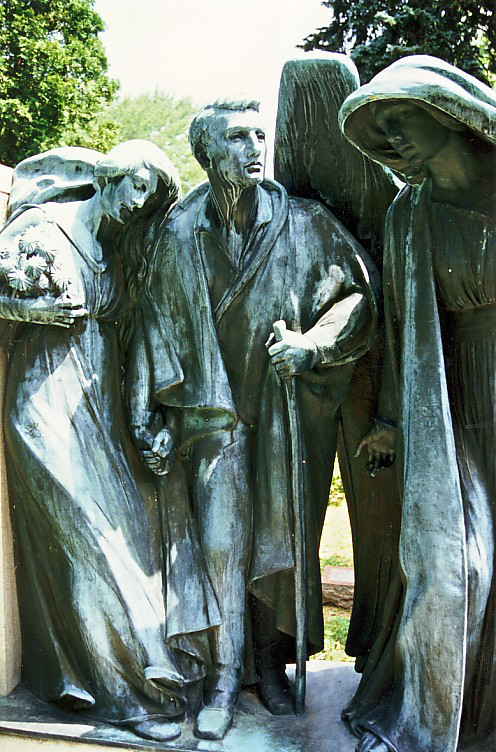
Diggins Monument

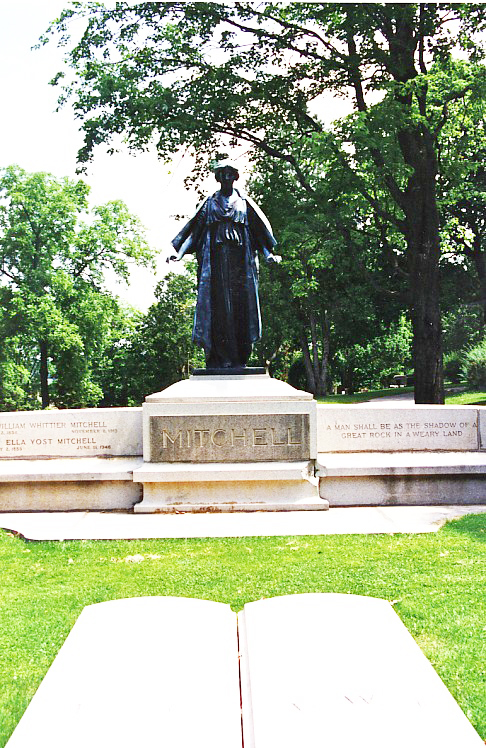
Mitchell

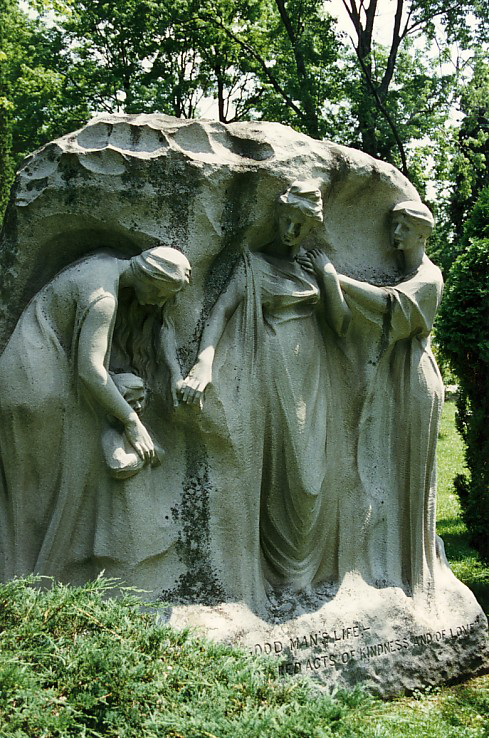
Delos F. Diggins

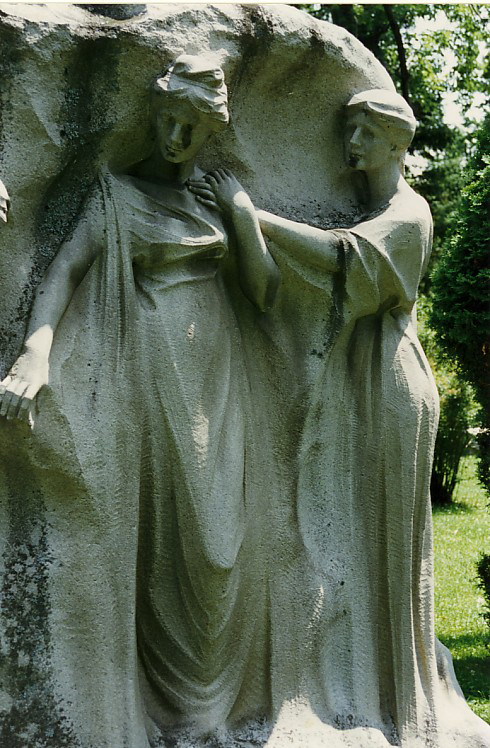
detail

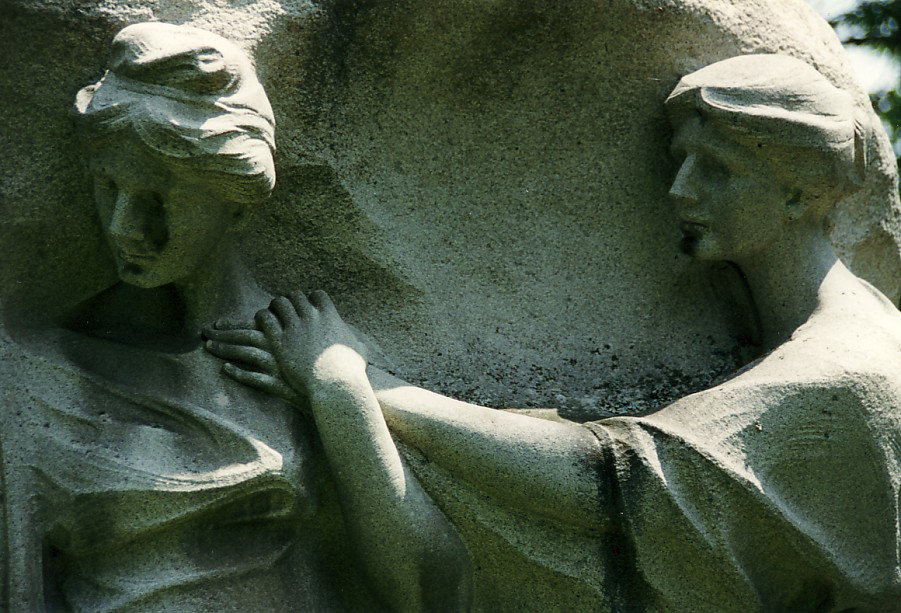
detail
- Winfield Scott Stratton, (1905), Colorado Springs, Colorado
- Lillian Watson, (1909), Chicago, Illinois
- Delos Diggins, (1909), Cadillac, Michigan
- Johannes Decker, (1910), Battle Creek, Michigan
- Fred and Carrie Diggins, (1916), Cadillac, Michigan
- W.W. Mitchell, (1916), Cadillac, Michigan
- Helen McMullen, (1919), Minneapolis, Minnesota
- Charles W. Shippey, (1922), Chicago, Illinois
- Myron L. Learned, (1928), Omaha, Nebraska
- Milton T. Barlow, (1930), Omaha, Nebraska
- Carl Gray, (1940), Baltimore, Maryland
- Butterfield Monument, (ca. 1920), Grand Rapids, Michigan

== Sources ==
- Contemporary American Sculpture, The California Palace of the Legion of Honor, Lincoln Park, San Francisco, The National Sculpture Society 1929
- Hunt, Inez, the Lady who Lived on Ladders, Filter Press, Palmer Lake, Colorado, 1970
- Kvaran, Einar Einarsson Cemetery Sculpture in America, unpublished manuscript
- McConnell, Susan, Public Treasures: Outdoor Sculpture in the Pikes Peak Region, City of Colorado Springs, Parks and Recreation Department, 1995
- Opitz, Glenn B, Editor, Mantle Fielding’s Dictionary of American Painters, Sculptors & Engravers, Apollo Book, Poughkeepsie NY, 1986
- Rubenstein, Charlotte Streifer, American Women Sculptors, G.K. Hall & Co., Boston 1990
- Taft, Lorado, The History of American Sculpture, MacMillan Co., New York, NY 1925
