= Harlan House Hotel =

- U.S. National Register of Historic Places
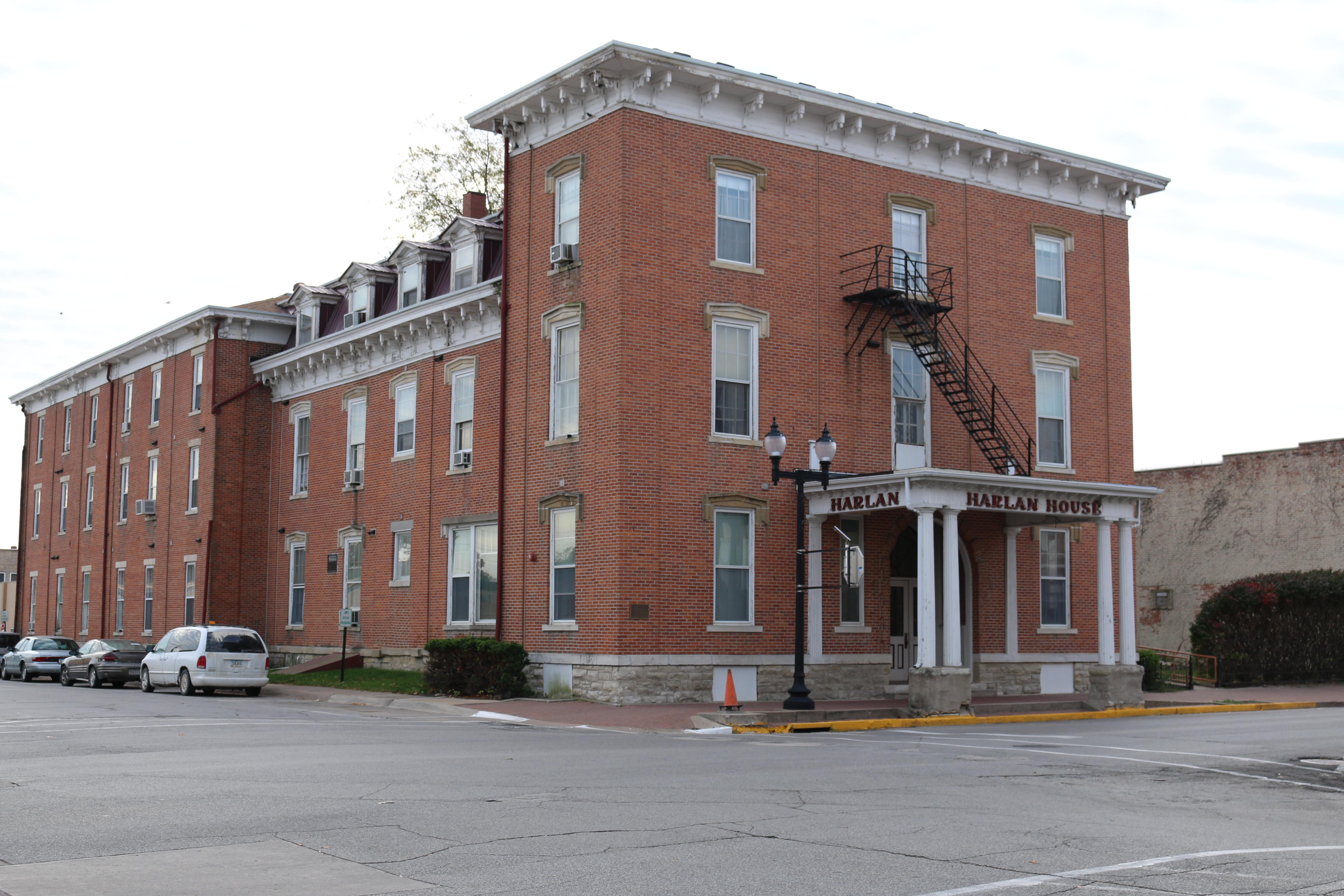

- Location within Iowa Location within the United States
- Location: 122 N. Jefferson St., Mount Pleasant, Iowa
- Coordinates: 40°58′03.3″N 91°33′14.7″W
- Area: less than one acre
- Built: 1857, 1873, c. 1880, 1892
- Architectural style: Italianate
- NRHP reference No.: 87002019
- Added to NRHP: November 16, 1987

The Harlan House Hotel is a historic building located in Mount Pleasant, Iowa, United States. It is associated with James Harlan, the first Republican to represent Iowa in the United States Senate (1855-1865, 1867–1872). He was also Secretary of the Interior (1865-1867). His daughter Mary was the wife of Robert Todd Lincoln, President Abraham Lincoln's only surviving son. Harlan built the oldest part of this building as his house in 1857. After his career as a Senator, he could no longer afford the house and bought another house in Mount Pleasant. Harlan built the first addition onto his old house and converted it into a hotel so he could support himself. He added onto the hotel two more times, c. 1880 and 1892. The first two additions are on the alley side of the building, and the third addition faces Jefferson Street. The middle section of the building with the bracketed cornice and mansard roof is the original house. Harlan moved into the hotel in the early 1890s and died here in 1899. A few minor alterations were made to the building in the 20th century. It was listed on the National Register of Historic Places in 1987.
