= Caleb Baldwin (judge) =

American judge (1824–1876)

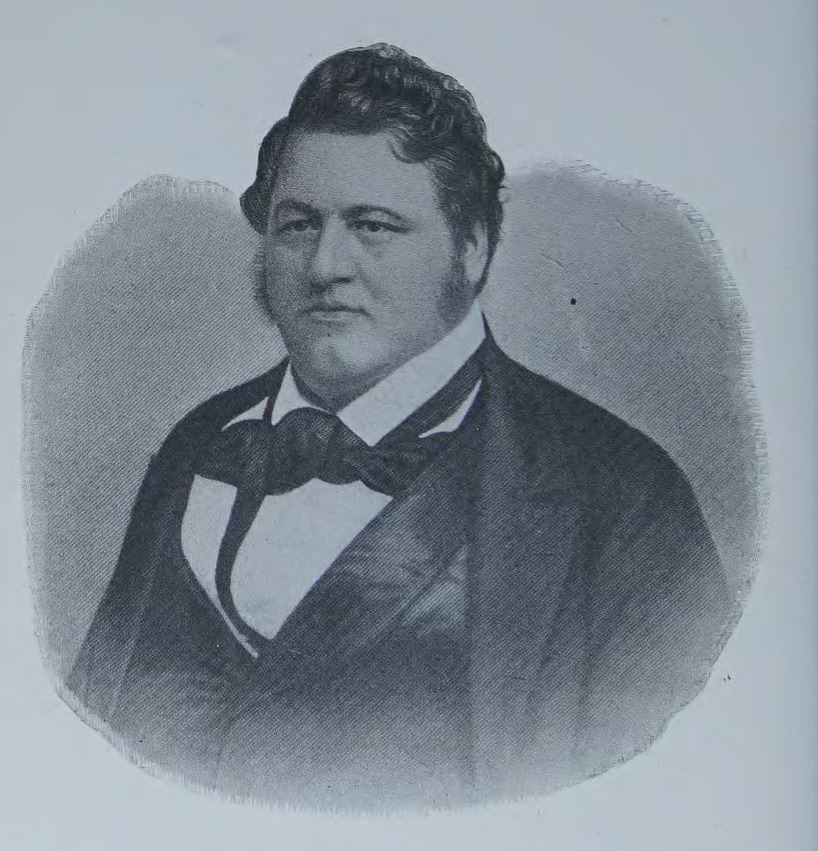

7th Chief Justice of the Iowa Supreme Court
- In office 1862–1863
- Preceded by: Ralph P. Lowe
- Succeeded by: George G. Wright

Associate Justice of the Iowa Supreme Court
- In office January 11, 1860 – December 31, 1863

Personal details
- Born: April 8, 1824
- Died: December 15, 1876 (aged 52)

Caleb Baldwin (April 8, 1824 – December 15, 1876) was a justice of the Iowa Supreme Court from January 11, 1860, to December 31, 1863, serving as chief justice from 1862 to 1863, appointed from Pottawattamie County, Iowa.

== Early life ==
Born in Washington County, Pennsylvania, Baldwin was educated at Washington College of Pennsylvania, graduating in 1842. He moved to Iowa, and began the practice of law in Fairfield, Iowa in 1846, before Iowa was admitted to the Union. He elected prosecuting attorney of Jefferson County, Iowa, for three successive terms.

== Judicial career ==
In 1855, Governor James W. Grimes appointed Baldwin to a seat on the Iowa District Court vacated by the resignation of W. H. Seevers. In 1857, Baldwin he moved to Council Bluffs, Iowa, his last place of residence. In 1859 he was elected to the Supreme Court of the State, in the first election held under the revised constitution, which provided for the election of judges by the people. In 1862, by seniority in office he became the chief justice of the state. In 1864 he resumed the practice of law, declining re-election to the bench.

In 1865 he was appointed by President Abraham Lincoln to serve as United States attorney for the District of Iowa. In 1874 he was appointed as a judge of the Court of Commissioners of the Alabama Claims, which position he occupied until his death.

== Death ==
He died of heart disease in 1876.

Political offices
Preceded by Newly constituted court	Justice of the Iowa Supreme Court; 1860–1863	Succeeded by John Forrest Dillon
