= Statue of James Harlan =

Sculpture formerly in the U.S. Capitol

James Harlan
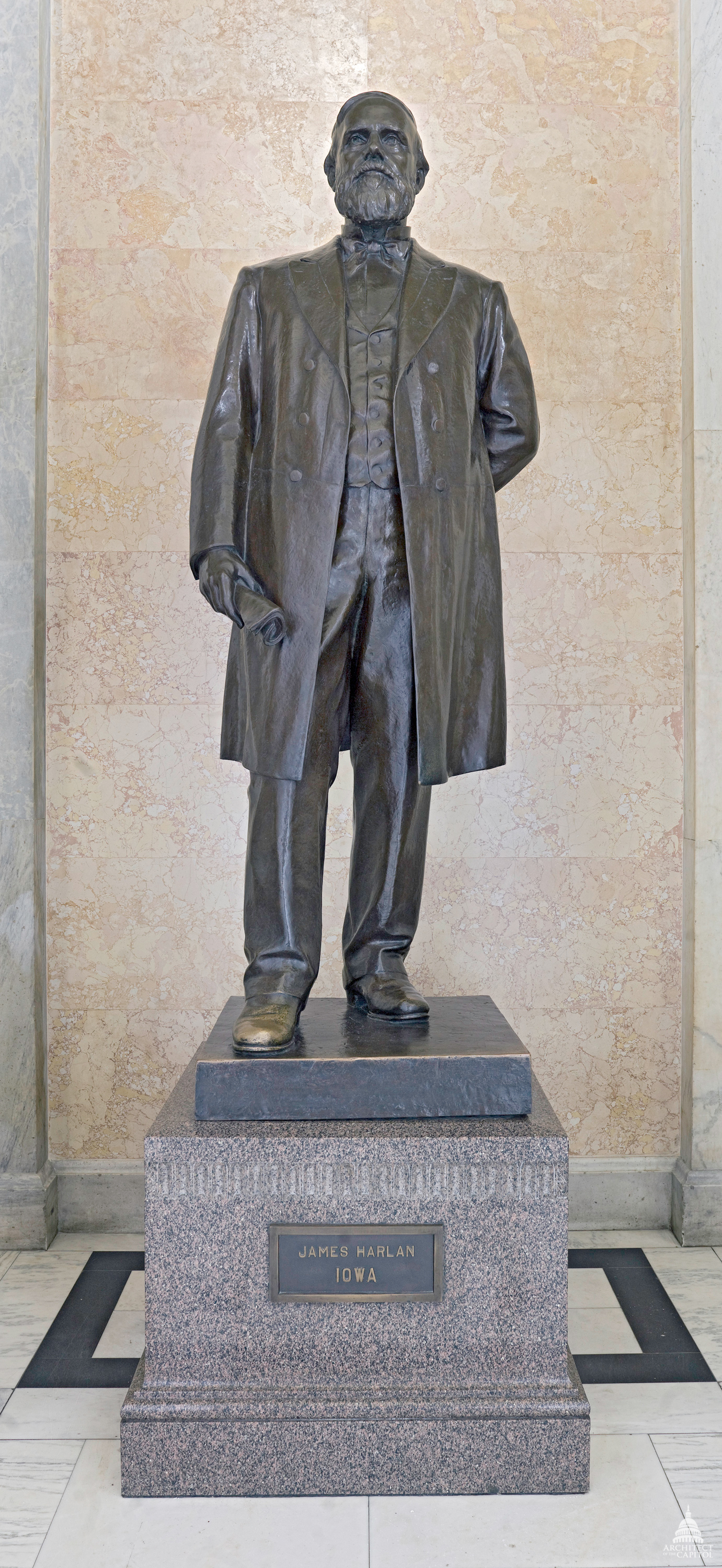
- The statue in the Hall of Columns in 2011
- Artist: Nellie Walker
- Medium: Bronze sculpture
- Subject: James Harlan

James Harlan is a bronze sculpture of the American attorney and politician of the same name by Nellie Walker, formerly installed in Washington, D.C.'s United States Capitol, as part of the National Statuary Hall Collection. The statue, which was gifted by the U.S. state of Iowa in 1910, was replaced with one portraying Norman Borlaug in 2014.

The statue is now on display on the campus of Iowa Wesleyan University.
