= James B. Howell =

American politician (1816–1880)

James Bruen Howell
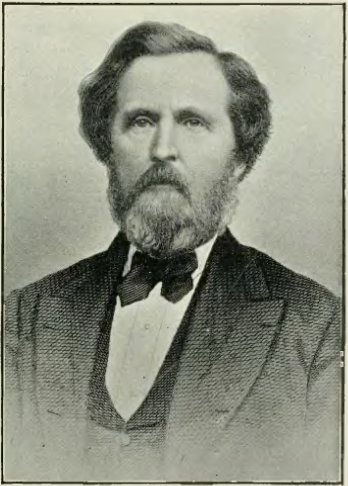

United States Senator from Iowa
- In office January 18, 1870 – March 3, 1871
- Preceded by: James W. Grimes
- Succeeded by: George G. Wright

Personal details
- Born: July 4, 1816 Morristown, New Jersey
- Died: June 17, 1880 (aged 63) Keokuk, Iowa
- Party: Republican

James Bruen Howell (July 4, 1816 - June 17, 1880) was an American lawyer, newspaper editor, and politician. The son of a Congressman from Ohio, Howell served as an appointed United States senator from Iowa for slightly over one year.

== Biography ==
=== Early years ===
James B. Howell was born July 4, 1816, near Morristown, New Jersey, the son of Elias and Eliza Howell. The family moved west to Newark, Ohio, in 1819, where James attended the public schools, graduating from high school in Newark. James' father, Elias Howell, was prominent in Ohio politics and was elected to the Ohio State Senate in 1830 and to U.S. Congress as a member of the anti-Jacksonian National Republican Party in 1836.

James Howell graduated from Miami University, located in Oxford, Ohio, in 1837. Following graduation Howell studied law for two years under Judge Hoeking H. Hunter of Lancaster, Ohio, gaining admission to the Ohio state bar in 1839. Following his admission to the bar, Howell opened a law practice in his hometown of Newark.

Troubled by ill health, in 1841 Howell decided to move to a more satisfactory locale. He settled upon the tiny town of Keosauqua in Van Buren County in the territory of Iowa, where he opened a new legal office and began to rebuild a legal practice.

=== Political career ===
Soon after arriving in Iowa, Howell became actively involved in the Whig Party, one of the two major American political parties of the day. His political interests led him to purchase an ailing newspaper, the Des Moines Valley Whig, the operation of which soon came to consume his interest. Howell subsequently gave up law to dedicate himself to full-time editorship of his partisan newspaper.

At the end of 1846 Iowa was admitted to the United States and a period of protracted growth followed. In 1849 Howell moved with his newspaper to the booming Iowa town of Keokuk, located on the southeastern tip of the state, renaming the publication the Gate City Daily. In his role as editor, Howell was a consistent opponent of slavery in the United States and to the ultra-nationalist movement known as Know-Nothingism.

As was the case with many Whigs, Howell shifted his political allegiance to the new Republican Party during the middle years of the 1850s. He was a signer of the convention call to establish the Republican Party in Iowa and a delegate from the state to the 1856 Republican National Convention held in Philadelphia. Howell was himself a frequent, albeit unsuccessful, Republican candidate for state and national office in the period.

Following the national Republican victory of 1860, Howell appointed as postmaster of Keokuk, then a political position. He served in that role from 1861 to 1866. An accident which crippled him for life left Howell unfit for enlistment in the Union cause during the American Civil War, although he remained a bitter opponent of the Southern rebellion.

In 1870, the Iowa General Assembly elected Howell to the U.S. Senate to fill the vacancy caused by the resignation of James W. Grimes. He served out the end of Grimes' term from January 18, 1870, to March 4, 1871, but was not a candidate for reelection to the Senate. He was one of three commissioners of the court of Southern claims appointed by President Ulysses Grant in 1871 to adjust claims for stores and supplies and served until 1880.

=== Death and legacy ===
Howell died June 17, 1880, in Keokuk at the age of 63. He was buried at Oakland Cemetery.

== Footnotes ==
U.S. Senate
| Preceded by James W. Grimes | U.S. senator (Class 2) from Iowa; 1870–1871; Served alongside: James Harlan | Succeeded by George G. Wright |
