= George G. Wright =

Iowa Supreme Court justice

George Grover Wright
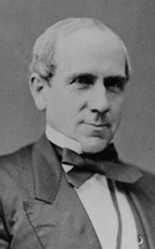

United States Senator from Iowa
- In office March 4, 1871 – March 3, 1877
- Preceded by: James B. Howell
- Succeeded by: Samuel J. Kirkwood

5th and 8th Chief Justice of the Iowa Supreme Court
- In office 1864–1865
- Preceded by: Caleb Baldwin
- Succeeded by: Ralph P. Lowe
- In office 1855–1859
- Preceded by: Joseph Williams
- Succeeded by: Ralph P. Lowe

Associate Justice of the Iowa Supreme Court
- In office June 1860 – September 1870
- In office January 1854 – January 1860

Member of the Iowa Senate
- In office 1849-1851

Personal details
- Born: March 24, 1820 Bloomington, Indiana, U.S.
- Died: January 11, 1896 (aged 75) Des Moines, Iowa, U.S.
- Party: Republican
- Relations: Joseph Albert Wright (Brother)

George Grover Wright (March 24, 1820 – January 11, 1896) was a pioneer lawyer, Iowa Supreme Court justice, law professor, and Republican United States Senator from Iowa.

Born in Bloomington, Indiana, he attended private schools and graduated from Indiana University at Bloomington in 1839. He studied law in Rockville, Indiana and was admitted to the bar in 1840, commencing practice in Keosauqua, Iowa Territory (now Keosauqua, Iowa).

He was prosecuting attorney of Van Buren County, Iowa in 1847-1848 and was a member of the Iowa Senate from 1849 to 1851. He was a justice of the Iowa Supreme Court from January 1854 to January 1860, and June 1860 to September 1870. He was the Court's chief justice for seven of those years. He also served as president of the Iowa Agricultural Society from 1860 to 1865.

Wright moved to Des Moines in 1865. In collaboration with Justice C. C. Cole, he established at Des Moines the first law school west of the Mississippi River. This school later became the University of Iowa College of Law. He served as one of its professors from 1865 to 1871.

In 1870, the Iowa General Assembly chose Wright (over William Boyd Allison and others) to serve a six-year term in the United States Senate. He served in the Senate from March 4, 1871, to March 4, 1877. He was not a candidate for reelection. While in the Senate, he was a member of the Senate Committee on the Judiciary (in the Forty-second Congress), a member of the Committee on Civil Service and Retrenchment (in the Forty-third Congress) and Committee on Claims (in the Forty-fourth Congress).

After leaving the Senate, he resumed the practice of his profession in Des Moines and also engaged in banking as the president of the Polk County Savings Bank. From 1887 to 1888 he was president of the American Bar Association. He died in Des Moines in 1896, aged 75, and was interred in Woodland Cemetery.

Wright's brother, Joseph Albert Wright, was a Governor and Senator from Indiana.

U.S. Senate
Preceded by James B. Howell	U.S. senator from Iowa; 1871–1877; Served alongside: James Harlan, William B. Allison	Succeeded by Samuel J. Kirkwood
