= Kirkwood House =

Historic house in Iowa, United States

- U.S. National Register of Historic Places
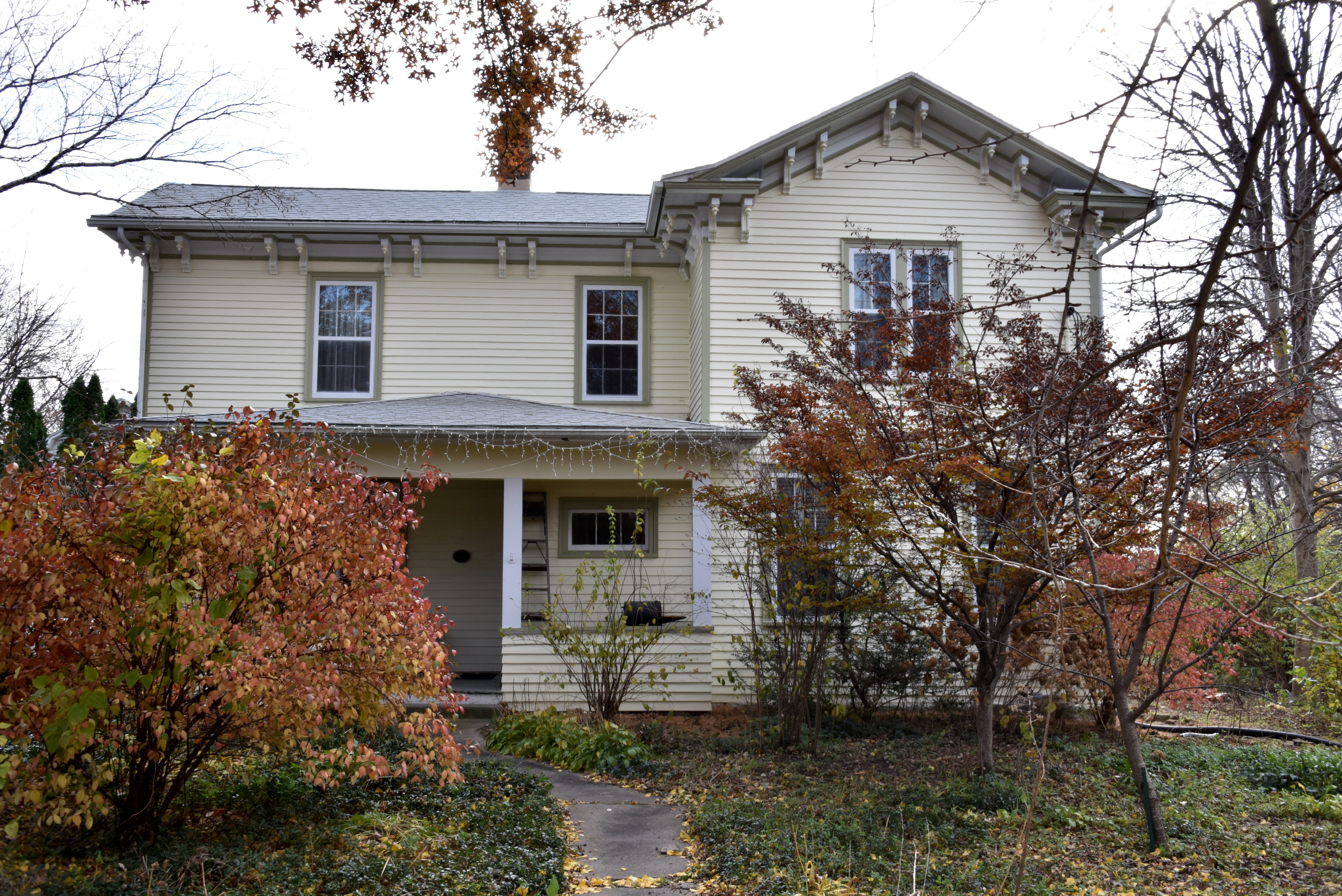

- Location within Iowa Location within the United States
- Location: 1101 Kirkwood Ave., Iowa City, Iowa
- Coordinates: 41°38′56.5″N 91°31′10.1″W
- Area: less than one acre
- Built: 1864
- NRHP reference No.: 74000792
- Added to NRHP: September 17, 1974

The Kirkwood House is a historic building located in Iowa City, Iowa, United States. It was built for the local attorney and businessman Samuel J. Kirkwood who also served as Governor of Iowa, represented Iowa in the United States Senate, and was Secretary of the Interior in the cabinet of President James A. Garfield. The house was built after his second term as governor and remained his home until his death in 1893. His widow remained here until her death in 1923. This was his home during most of his political career and it reflects the "rural and unpretentious style of living" that the Kirkwoods preferred. The house was originally located on a much larger estate, but the rest of it has subsequently been divided into lots and sold. The two-story L-shaped wood-frame structure, which sits further back from the street than other houses on the block, has paired brackets and a roof line cornice as its only ornamentation. The house was listed on the National Register of Historic Places in 1974.
