= Ralph P. Lowe =

American judge

Ralph Phillips Lowe
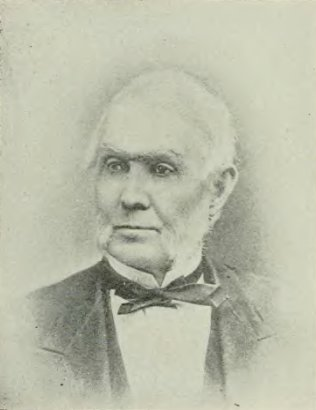

6th & 9th Chief Justice of the Iowa Supreme Court
- In office 1866–1867
- Preceded by: George G. Wright
- Succeeded by: Caleb Baldwin
- In office 1860–1861
- Preceded by: George G. Wright
- Succeeded by: John Forrest Dillon

Associate Justice of the Iowa Supreme Court
- In office 1860–1867
- Appointed by: Samuel J. Kirkwood

4th Governor of Iowa
- In office January 13, 1858 – January 11, 1860
- Preceded by: James W. Grimes
- Succeeded by: Samuel J. Kirkwood

Judge of the Iowa's 1st Judicial District
- In office 1852–1857
- Preceded by: George Henry Williams
- Succeeded by: Thomas W. Clagett

Personal details
- Born: November 27, 1805 Warren County, Ohio, U.S.
- Died: December 22, 1883 (aged 78) Washington, D.C., U.S.
- Party: Republican
- Spouse: Phoebe Carleton (m.1837)
- Children: 11
- Profession: Judge

Ralph Phillips Lowe (November 27, 1805 – December 22, 1883) was an American judge and the 4th governor of Iowa. He was the first Republican governor of Iowa.

== Early life ==
Lowe was born in Warren County, Ohio to Jacob Derrick Lowe and Maria Lowe (nee Perlee). Ralph was one of 5 sons, 3 who became lawyers. He attended and graduated from Miami University in 1829. He married Phoebe Carleton in 1837 and they had 11 children.

== Early Legal Career ==
He studied law in Alabama for a time, before starting a new law practice with his brother, Peter, in Dayton, Ohio.

== Judicial career ==
He later moved to the town of Muscatine, and was selected as a representative to the Iowa state constitutional convention in 1844. He moved to Lee County in 1849, and became the district judge succeeding President Grant's future US Attorney General George Henry Williams, in 1852 until 1857.

== Governorship ==
In 1857 he was nominated as the Republican candidate for Governor of Iowa, with Oran Faville as his lieutenant. He won the election by a narrow margin (38,498 votes to 36,088) and served as governor for two years between 1858 and 1860. During his tenure, the State Census was authorized and the Iowa State Bank was incorporated. A school for the blind was created in Keokuk. Also, in 1858, the State Agriculture College Act was passed creating the Iowa Agricultural College and Model Farm, now known as Iowa State University.

== Later life ==
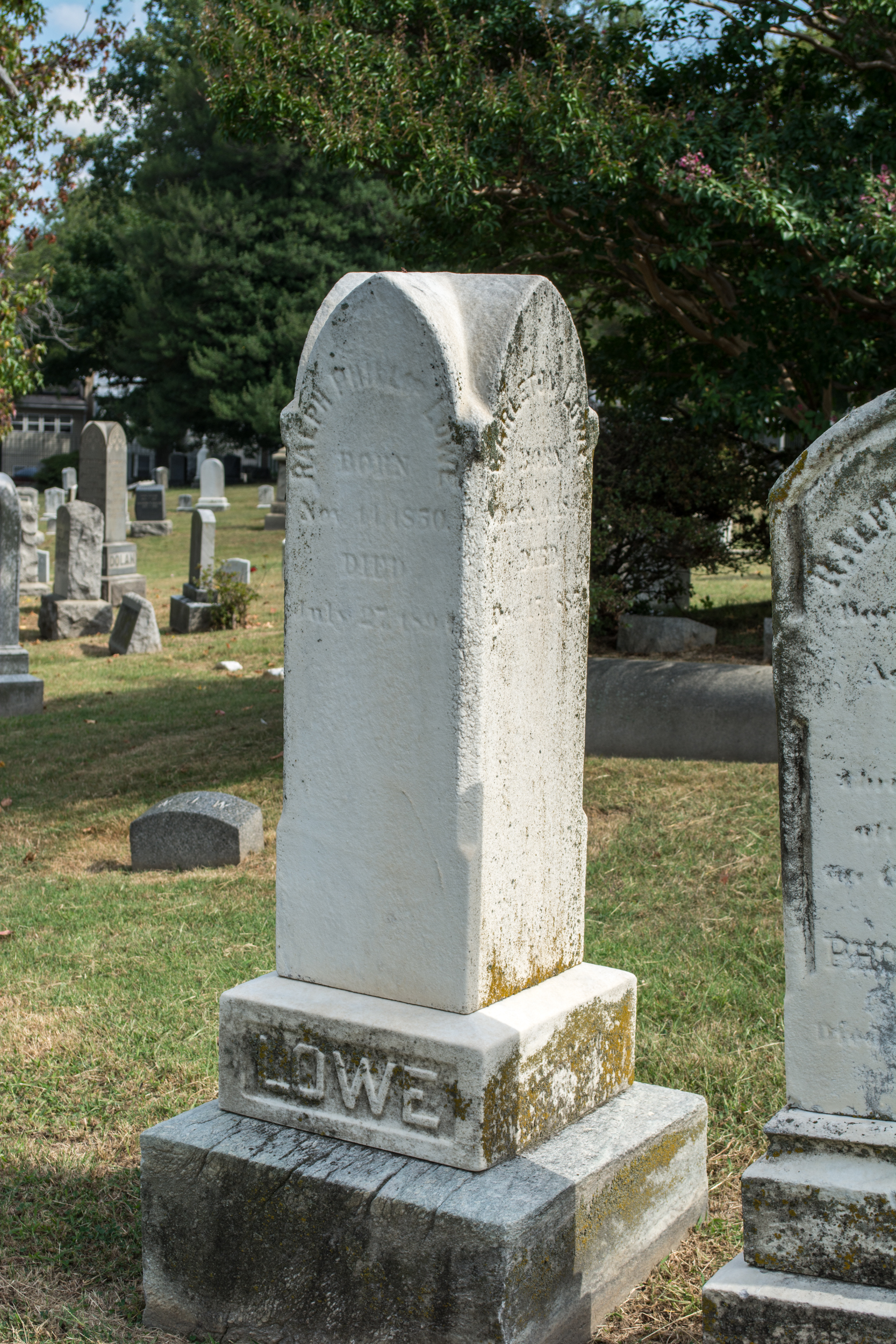
Grave of Ralph P. Lowe.

At the end of his term he was appointed as a justice of the Iowa Supreme Court, which he served as between 1860 and 1867. He resumed practicing law, and in 1874 moved to the District of Columbia. He made attempts to help Iowa's claim against the federal government for the sum of $800,000. This had accrued due to the federal government promising to compensate states for not taxing land purchases until five years after their sale. For the rest of his life he fought with Congress to get the reparations due to Iowa, but failed when they continued to refuse to pay.

He died on December 22, 1883 in DC. He was interred at Glenwood Cemetery. His wife died in 1891 and is buried next to her husband.

Preceded by James W. Grimes	Governor of Iowa; 1858–1860	Succeeded by Samuel J. Kirkwood
