= Samuel J. Kirkwood =

American politician (1813–1894)

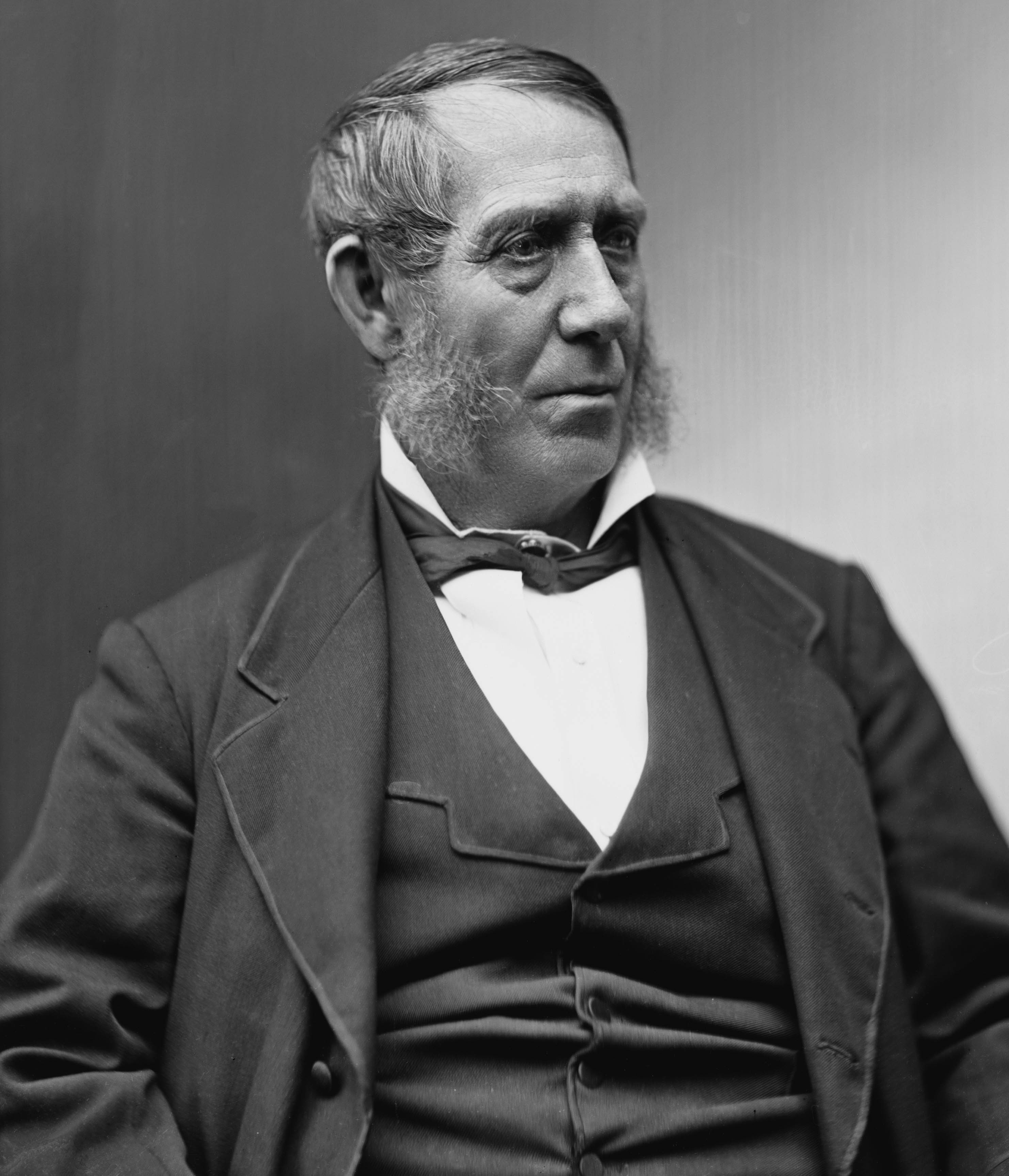
- Kirkwood, 1870–1880

14th United States Secretary of the Interior
- In office March 8, 1881 – April 17, 1882
- President: James A. Garfield; Chester A. Arthur
- Preceded by: Carl Schurz
- Succeeded by: Henry M. Teller

United States Senator from Iowa
- In office March 4, 1877 – March 7, 1881
- Preceded by: George G. Wright
- Succeeded by: James W. McDill
- In office January 13, 1866 – March 3, 1867
- Preceded by: James Harlan
- Succeeded by: James Harlan

5th and 9th Governor of Iowa
- In office January 13, 1876 – February 1, 1877
- Lieutenant: Joshua G. Newbold
- Preceded by: Cyrus C. Carpenter
- Succeeded by: Joshua G. Newbold
- In office January 11, 1860 – January 14, 1864
- Lieutenant: Nicholas J. Rusch; John R. Needham
- Preceded by: Ralph P. Lowe
- Succeeded by: William M. Stone

Member of the Iowa Senate
- In office 1856–1859
- Constituency: 6th district

Personal details
- Born: Samuel Jordan Kirkwood; December 20, 1813 Harford County, Maryland, U.S.
- Died: September 1, 1894 (aged 80) Iowa City, Iowa, U.S.
- Resting place: Oakland Cemetery
- Party: Republican
- Spouse: Jane Clark

Samuel Jordan Kirkwood (December 20, 1813 – September 1, 1894) was an American politician who twice served as governor of Iowa, twice as a U.S. senator from Iowa, and as the U.S. secretary of the interior.

== Early life and career ==
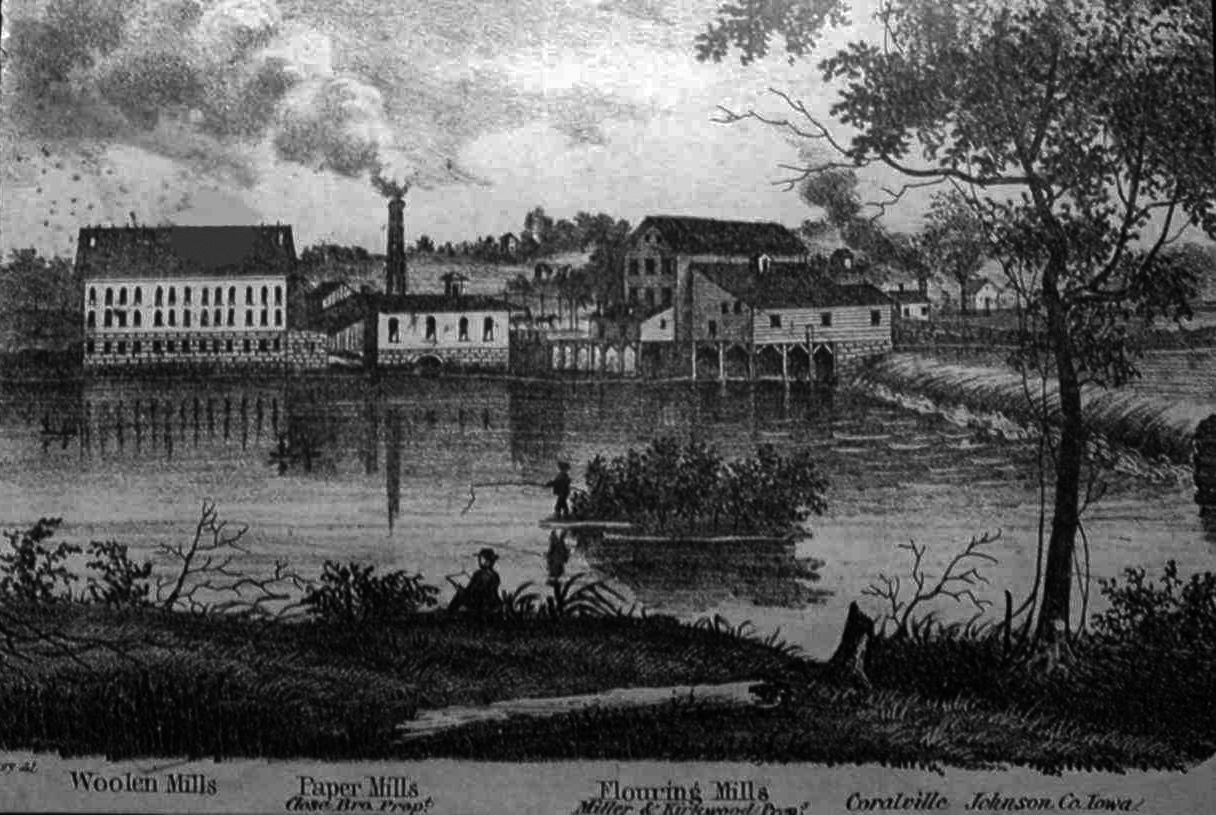
Coralville mills in 1870; Kirkwood's mill on the right

Samuel Jordan Kirkwood was born on December 20, 1813, in Harford County, Maryland. At age 17, he began teaching school and had as one of his pupils his cousin Daniel Kirkwood, who later achieved prominence as a mathematician and astronomer. Samuel spent part of his youth in Washington, D.C., then joined his father in moving to Ohio in 1835. There he became a well-known anti-slavery Democrat. He was elected to several state offices and worked closely with Thomas Bartley, the future governor of Ohio, in the 1840s.

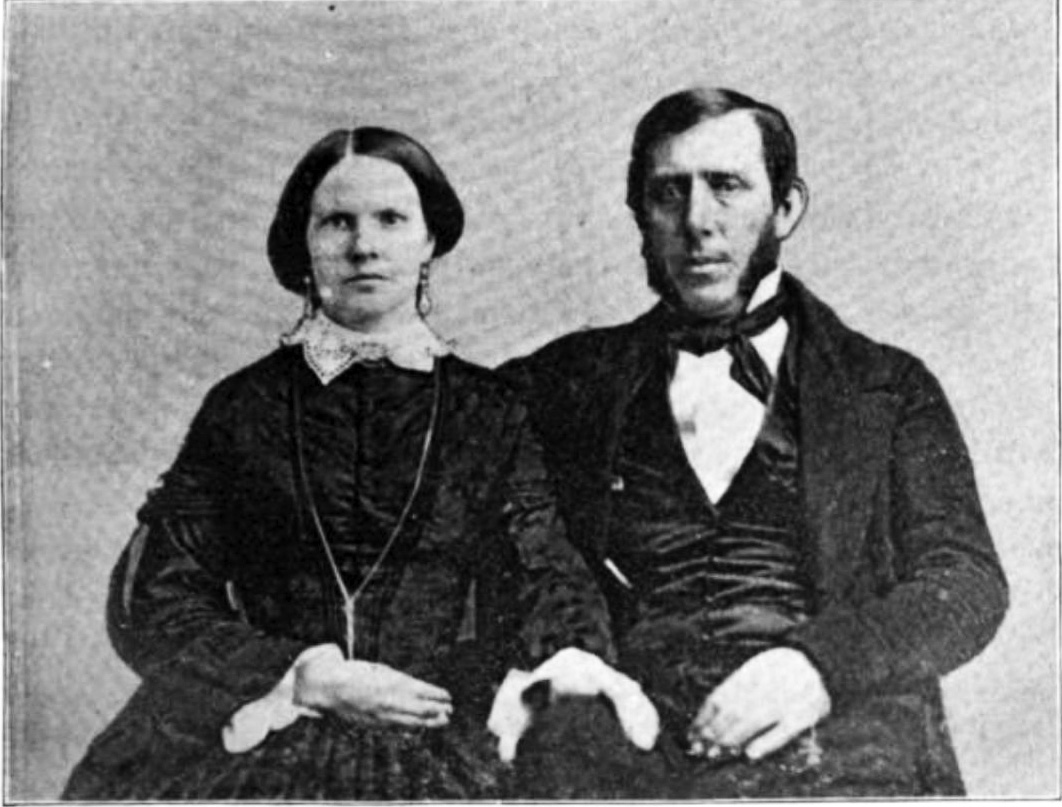
Jane and Samuel Kirkwood, 1852

In 1855, Kirkwood moved to Iowa, living northwest of Iowa City, and became involved with the Clark family, also from Ohio, in a milling venture, and then with the Clark and Lucas families in land speculation. Kirkwood married Jane Clark, the sister of Phoebe Ann Clark, and thus became the brother-in-law of Edward Lucas, son of Iowa's first Territorial Governor Robert Lucas and his second wife, Friendly Ashley (Sumner) Lucas.

Although Kirkwood intended to leave politics behind him in Iowa, he took an interest in the newly founded Republican Party. Summoned from his mill at Coralville and still coated in flour dust, Kirkwood gave a rousing speech at the founding meeting of the Iowa Republican Party in February 1856. Many people credited Kirkwood’s speech and subsequent work with the success of the Republican Party in Iowa; that year he was elected to the Iowa Senate serving from 1856 to 1859.

== Governorship: Coppock incident and the Civil War ==
In 1859, Kirkwood was nominated for governor and defeated Augustus C. Dodge after a bitter campaign which focused on the slave issue. In 1860, Kirkwood’s first year in office, the John Brown raid on Harpers Ferry further polarized the nation over slavery, and Kirkwood was clearly on the side of the militant abolitionists. When Barclay Coppock, a youth from Springdale, who was part of Brown’s raid, fled to Iowa, Kirkwood refused to accept extradition papers for him from Virginia, and allowed Coppock to escape.

During the Civil War, Kirkwood gained national attention for his extraordinary efforts to secure soldiers and supplies from Iowa for the Union Army. A strong supporter of President Abraham Lincoln's policies during the American Civil War, he was active in raising and equipping dozens of regiments for the Union Army.

In 1862, he attended the Loyal War Governors' Conference in Altoona, Pennsylvania, which ultimately gave Lincoln support for his Emancipation Proclamation.

== Senate and Secretary of the Interior ==
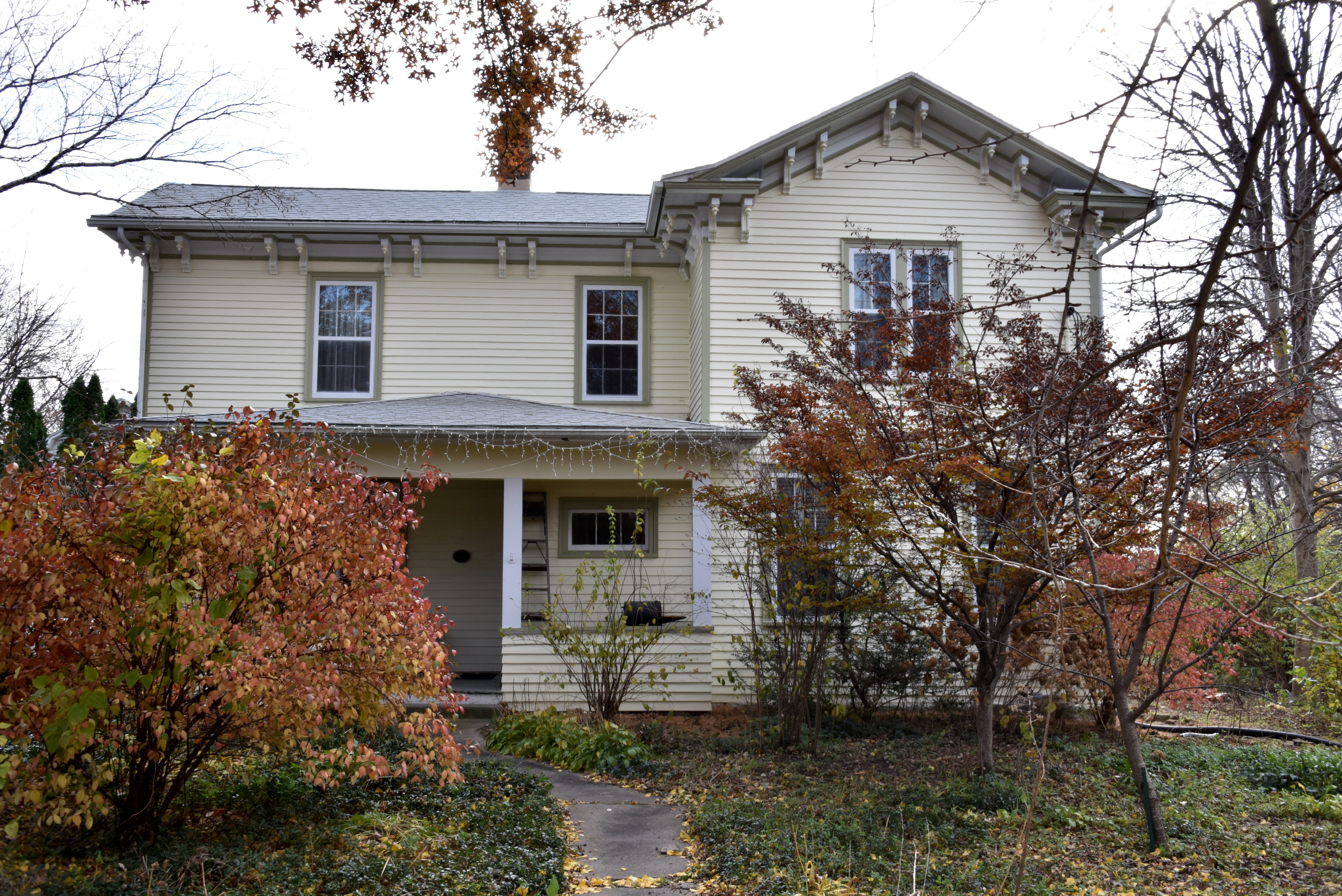
The 1864 Kirkwood House in Iowa City

After he left office in 1864, Kirkwood moved to a new house on Wyoming Road in Iowa City (now Kirkwood Avenue) and practiced law. About this time Kirkwood sold his share of the mill, part of it to his brother, William, and part to Valentine Miller. In 1865-1867, he served the remainder of James Harlan’s term in the U.S. Senate, and served in the Senate again from 1877 to 1881. Between his separate terms as a Senator, he was again the Governor of Iowa from 1876 to 1877. He resigned as governor in 1877 to begin his second term as U.S. Senator. In 1881, Kirkwood resigned his Senate seat to become Secretary of the Interior under President James A. Garfield, a position he would continue to serve in under President Chester A. Arthur after the Assassination of President Garfield. He served as Interior Secretary until 1882. He unsuccessfully ran for Congress in 1886.

Kirkwood died on September 1, 1894, in Iowa City, and is buried in Oakland Cemetery.

== Memorials ==
=== Monuments ===
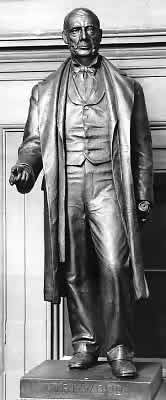
Samuel J. Kirkwood statue in the National Statuary Hall Collection in the United States Capitol

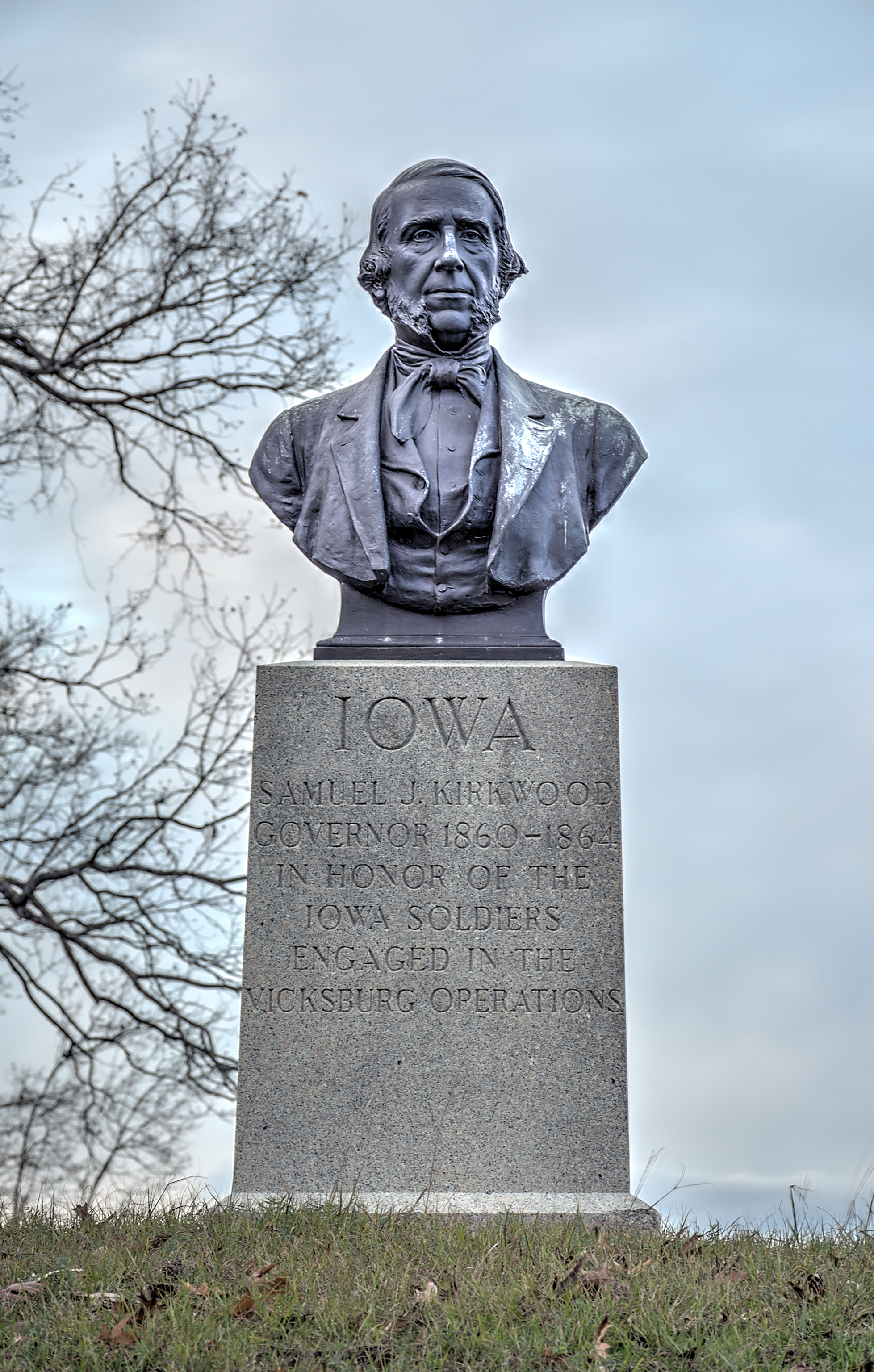
Bust of Kirkwood by H.H. Kitson at Vicksburg National Military Park

- Kirkwood's sculptured likeness by sculptor Vinnie Ream is maintained among the two coveted statues apportioned to each state on display under the rotunda in the National Statuary Hall Collection in the United States Capitol in Washington, D.C.
- A bust of Kirkwood is in the Vicksburg National Military Park.
- A memorial plaque is in front of Iowa City High School.

=== Educational institutions ===
- Kirkwood Community College is named for the former Iowa Governor and Senator it has several campuses in eastern Iowa. Its mascot is an eagle named "Sammy".
- Kirkwood Elementary School is located in Coralville, the town where Kirkwood ran his mill.

=== Places ===
- The town of Kirkwood, Illinois.
- Kirkwood Avenue in Iowa City.
- Kirkwood Avenue in Des Moines.
- Kirkwood Boulevard in Davenport.
- The Kirkwood House in Iowa City is listed on the National Register of Historic Places.
- The Hotel Kirkwood in Des Moines, which is named in his honor, is also listed on the National Register.

== Bibliography ==
- Aurner, Charles R. (1912)Leading Events in Johnson County, Iowa, History. Western Historical, Cedar Rapids, Iowa.
- Parish, John C. (1921) The Miller of Coralville. In Yearbook of the Old Settlers Association: 1920–1921, pp. 6–18. Johnson County Old Settlers Association, Iowa City, Iowa.
- Dan E. Clark (1917) Samuel Jordan Kirkwood, Iowa City
- Henry W. Lathrop (1893), The Life and Times of Samuel J. Kirkwood, Iowa's War Governor, Chicago

Party political offices
| Preceded by Ralph P. Lowe | Republican nominee for Governor of Iowa; 1859, 1861 | Succeeded by William M. Stone |
| Preceded by Cyrus C. Carpenter | Republican nominee for Governor of Iowa; 1875 | Succeeded by John H. Gear |
Political offices
| Preceded by Ralph P. Lowe | Governor of Iowa; 1860–1864 | Succeeded by William M. Stone |
| Preceded by Cyrus C. Carpenter | Governor of Iowa; 1876–1877 | Succeeded by Joshua G. Newbold |
| Preceded by Carl Schurz | United States Secretary of the Interior; 1881–1882 | Succeeded by Henry M. Teller |
U.S. Senate
| Preceded by James Harlan | U.S. Senator (Class 3) from Iowa; 1866–1867; Served alongside: James W. Grimes | Succeeded by James Harlan |
| Preceded by George G. Wright | U.S. Senator (Class 2) from Iowa; 1877–1881; Served alongside: William B. Allison | Succeeded by James W. McDill |
