= William B. Allison =

American politician (1829–1908)

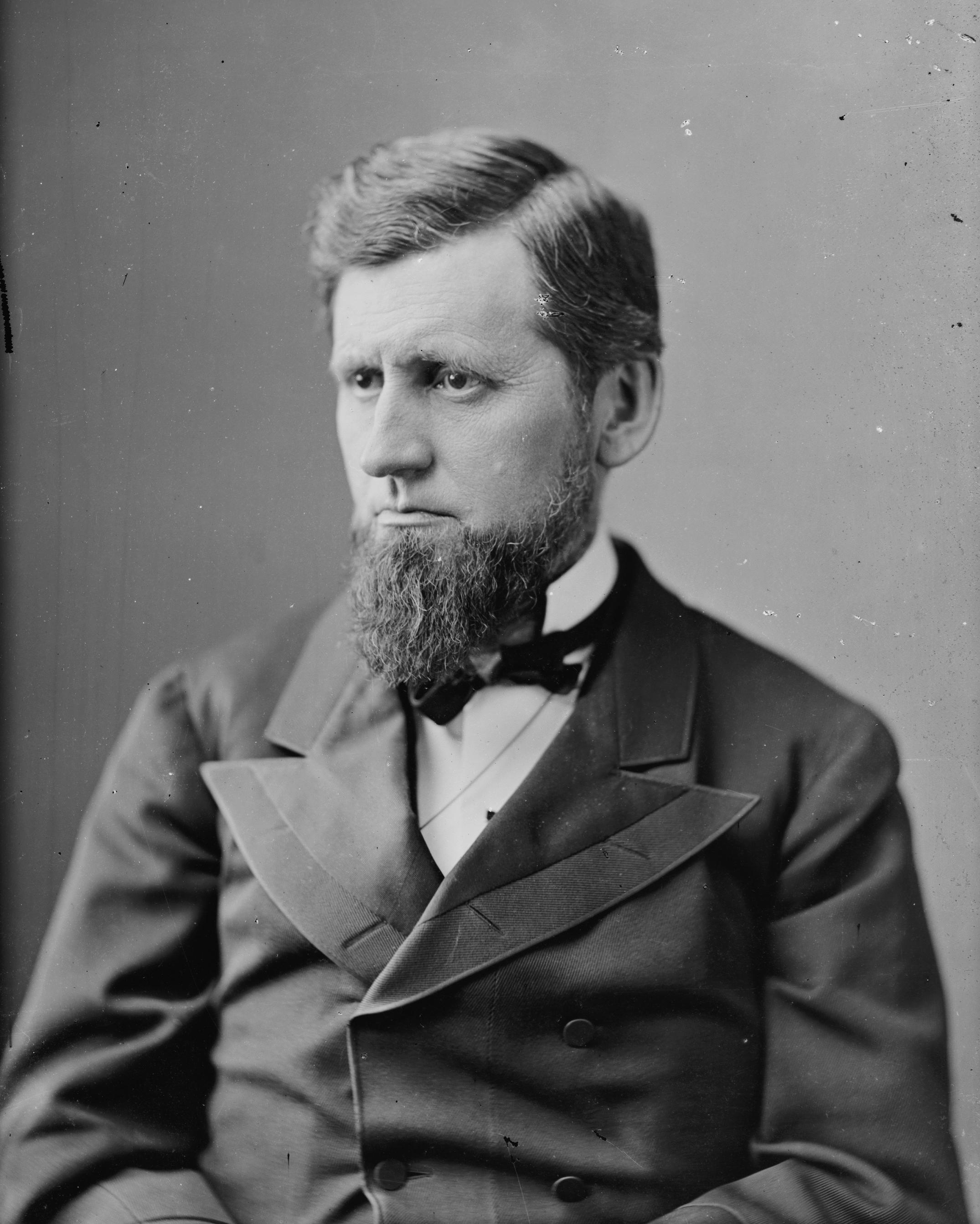
- Allison in 1870

Chairman of the Senate Republican Conference
- In office March 4, 1897 – August 4, 1908
- Preceded by: John Sherman
- Succeeded by: Eugene Hale

United States Senator from Iowa
- In office March 4, 1873 – August 4, 1908
- Preceded by: James Harlan
- Succeeded by: Albert B. Cummins

Member of the U.S. House of Representatives from Iowa's 3rd district
- In office March 4, 1863 – March 3, 1871
- Preceded by: District created
- Succeeded by: William G. Donnan

Personal details
- Born: William Boyd Allison; March 2, 1829 Perry, Ohio, U.S.
- Died: August 4, 1908 (aged 79) Dubuque, Iowa, U.S.
- Party: Whig; Know Nothing; Republican
- Spouse(s): Anna Carter Allison; Mary Neally Allison
- Education: Allegheny College; Western Reserve College
- Profession: Politician, Lawyer

Military service
- Allegiance: United States
- Branch/service: United States Army
- Rank: Lieutenant Colonel
- Battles/wars: American Civil War

William Boyd Allison (March 2, 1829 – August 4, 1908) was an American politician. An early leader of the Iowa Republican Party, he represented northeastern Iowa in the United States House of Representatives before representing his state in the United States Senate. By the 1890s, Allison had become one of the "big four" key Republicans who largely controlled the Senate, along with Orville H. Platt of Connecticut, John Coit Spooner of Wisconsin and Nelson W. Aldrich of Rhode Island.

Born in Perry, Ohio, Allison established a legal practice in Dubuque, Iowa, and became a prominent member of the nascent Iowa Republican Party. He was a delegate to the 1860 Republican National Convention and won election to the House of Representatives in 1862. He served four terms in the House and won election to the Senate in 1872. He became chairman of the powerful Senate Appropriations Committee, serving for all but two years between 1881 and 1908. Four different Republican presidents asked Allison to join their Cabinet, but Allison declined each offer. A significant number of delegates supported his presidential nomination at the 1888 and 1896 Republican National Conventions.

Allison emerged as a centrist and pragmatic leader in the Senate, and he helped pass several important bills. The Bland–Allison Act of 1878 restored bimetallism, but in a less inflationary manner than had been sought by Congressman Richard P. Bland. A prominent advocate of higher tariffs, Allison played a major role in the passage of the McKinley Tariff and the Dingley Act. He also helped pass the Hepburn Act by offering the Allison amendment, which granted courts the power to review the Interstate Commerce Commission's railroad rate-setting. Allison sought a record seventh term in 1908, but died shortly after winning the Republican primary against progressive leader Albert B. Cummins.

== Early life and career ==
Born in Perry, Ohio, Allison was educated at Wooster Academy. Afterward, he spent a year at Allegheny College in Pennsylvania, then graduated from Western Reserve College (then located in Hudson, Ohio) in 1849. He then studied law and began practicing in Ashland, Ohio. While practicing law there from 1852 until 1857, he was a delegate to the 1855 Ohio Republican Convention and an unsuccessful candidate for district attorney in 1856. In 1857, he moved to Dubuque, Iowa, which would serve as his hometown for the last fifty years of his life.

While in Ohio, Allison's rise in politics coincided during a period of time where the Whig Party was facing collapse due to internal divisions over slavery. An abolitionist and supporter of business interests, he served in conventions to the newly formed Republican Party as well as the Know Nothing Party.

Although serving in the 1856 Know Nothing national convention, Allison left the party and joined the Republicans. Following an unsuccessful bid for county attorney, he moved to Dubuque, Iowa, where his older brother resided. Although the city was a stronghold for the Democratic Party at the time, Allison's ties with a law partnership and a Presbyterian church proved to successfully propel him into the state GOP leadership.

== Civil War ==
After his arrival in Dubuque, Allison took a prominent part in the politics of the nascent Republican Party. He was a delegate to the 1860 Republican National Convention in Chicago, which nominated Abraham Lincoln for President of the United States.

During the subsequent Civil War, he was on the staff of Iowa Governor Samuel J. Kirkwood, who ordered him to help the state raise regiments for the war. He personally helped raise four regiments. He was given the rank of lieutenant colonel during the war, although it was unlikely he actually served in uniform.

In 1862, in the midst of the war, Allison was elected to the United States House of Representatives as the representative of Iowa's newly created 3rd congressional district. As a congressman and member of the House Ways and Means Committee, he pushed for higher tariffs.

The Census of 1860 led to an increase in Iowa's congressional district seats from two to six. In the 1862 midterms, Allison ran for the U.S. House of Representatives from the third district which included Dubuque, challenging incumbent Republican congressman William Vandever. Benefiting from connections to Kirkwood in addition to railroad interests, he denied Vandever renomination and won the general election.

In the House, Allison sided with the powerful Radical Republican wing of the party which frequently opposed President Lincoln's policies as being too moderate, instead favoring a harsher treatment of the Confederacy. After being re-elected in 1864, he was a member of the powerful Ways and Means Committee, in addition to emerging as a leading expert on protective tariffs and railroads. His tariff viewpoints were described as having "not always pleased" constituents.

The Radical Republicans were not unified on ideological issues aside from their advocacy of harsher Reconstruction policies to ensure and safeguard the constitutional rights of blacks. Indeed, Allison broke from the factions' more staunchly conservative members in maintaining a moderate stance on tariff policy. However, he strongly represented railroad interests, on which he was accused of conflicts of interests.

== Post-war political career ==
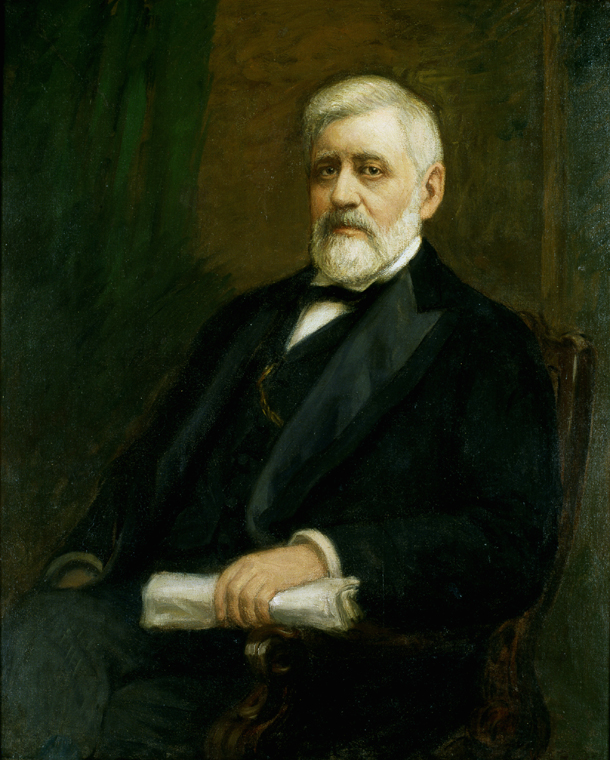
Portrait of Senator Allison which hangs in the U.S. Capitol.

Following the war, Allison continued to serve in the House after winning re-election in 1866 and 1868. In January 1870, he was an unsuccessful candidate for election by the Iowa General Assembly to the United States Senate seat for 1871–1877, losing to Iowa Supreme Court Justice George G. Wright. Allison declined to be a candidate for renomination to his own House seat later that year, but instead focused on laying the groundwork to run for Iowa's other Senate seat (then held by James Harlan), which was up in January 1872, following November 1871 state legislative races. In the 1871 state legislative races, candidates were nominated and elected on the direct issue of whether they would vote for Harlan, Allison or James F. Wilson for senator. Enough legislators who favored Allison were nominated and elected in 1871 that in January 1872 he won the required number of votes to take Harlan's U.S. Senate seat, effective March 4, 1873. In 1872, he was one of the 9 politicians who were submitted to be investigated by the House of Representatives for his possible involvement in the Crédit Mobilier scandal.

Allison was reelected to six-year terms in the U.S. Senate six times – in 1878, 1884, 1890, 1896, and 1902. His U.S. Senate tenure was marked by his influence on regulation, railroad, and tariff policy. Initially retaining the moderate stances he was known for during his House years, Allison over time sided with protectionists. A defender of President Ulysses S. Grant, he also allied with the Stalwarts, the conservative wing of the GOP which opposed civil service reform in the late 1870s out of concern for the plight of Southern blacks in addition to supporting Grant during the 1880 United States presidential election.

He chaired the 1884–1886 Allison Commission, a bipartisan joint congressional committee "among the first to explore the question of whether federal intervention politicizes scientific research." It considered the charge that parts of the government were engaged in research for theoretical, not practical, purposes. The majority report favored the status quo, and Congress upheld it. In 1885, the Commission's finding of misuse of funds at the United States Coast and Geodetic Survey led to the dismissal of several officials but exonerated Charles Sanders Peirce.

As Allison earned seniority, he also earned one of the most powerful committee positions. From 1881–93 and again from 1895 to 1908, he was chairman of the Senate Appropriations Committee, where he had great influence. Allison's combined years as chairman of the committee make him the longest-serving chairman to date. He was also a member of the Senate Committee of Indian Affairs (and its chairman from 1875 to 1881), the Senate Finance Committee, and the Committee on Engrossed Bills. He became chairman of the Senate Republican Conference in 1897.

He was asked three times to serve as the Secretary of the Treasury, first by President James A. Garfield, whose offer he accepted, but later he asked for his name to be withdrawn after being pressured out of it by the Stalwart faction of the Republican Party, of which he was a part. Later, President Chester Arthur offered (to which Allison again agreed but then the next day declined), then by President Benjamin Harrison. In 1897, President William McKinley offered him the position of U.S. Secretary of State. Again, Allison declined.

Allison sat on the Senate Finance Committee for thirty years and took a critical role in framing legislation. In 1881, he became chairman of the Appropriations Committee, and continued to serve there until his death in 1908. After 1897, he was chosen as chairman of the Republican caucus, an unofficial position, but one generally accorded to the most venerable and respected party member in the Senate.

Eminently conservative, trusted by the railroad interests, Allison's pragmatism made him the centrist that everybody could deal with, including Democratic colleagues. When in 1888 a Republican alternative was needed to the Mills tariff bill coming out of the House, Allison handled the details. The bill that emerged from committee was purely for campaign purposes. Nobody thought that it could pass, but it put the best face on protectionist principles and later served as a model for the 1890 McKinley Tariff, which Allison played a large part in framing. In 1897, when the Dingley Tariff bill reached the Senate, Allison did most of the work reconciling discontented interests. When the Bland bill, allowing the free coinage of silver, came to the Senate, Allison altered it. The resulting Bland–Allison Act of 1878 simply had the government buy a certain, more limited amount of silver, which the Treasury was permitted to put into circulation as silver dollars. It was far less inflationary than Bland's original bill. The Act passed over the veto of President Rutherford B. Hayes. It remained unchanged until the Sherman Silver Purchase Act of 1890. In 1892, Allison chaired the Brussels Monetary Conference and in 1900 was one of the fathers of the Gold Standard Act.

In 1896, he became a dark-horse candidate for the presidency. However, support for his candidacy faded when it became clear that McKinley would be nominated on the first ballot.

"Allison is the man of experience," an admiring reporter wrote in 1906, "the sage old pilot of the Senate. They say that no man who has ever been in the Senate knew so much about it as he does. He is the political forecaster, the compromiser, the weather prophet, the man who brings irreconcilable things together. It is said that the oldest inhabitant cannot recall having heard Allison give utterance to an opinion on any subject whatever. Doubtless he does give utterance to them, but never except in the inner councils of the Caesars. Sagacious to the point of craft, it does not annoy him to know that the epithet most frequently applied to him is 'the Old Fox.'...When he rises in his place in the Senate, he disdains to talk as if he were making a speech; he leaves all that to the youngsters, whose sum of knowledge does not equal all that he has forgotten. He never rises except to shed light on some knotty point, and when he does it is always as briefly as possible, and in a conversational voice that is almost an undertone. Then he drops back into his seat and, with sublime indifference, lets the talk go on."

Allison was married twice, first to Anna Carter, who died in 1859, four years after the marriage. His second marriage was to Mary Neally, who died in 1883, ten years after their marriage.

== 1908 Senate race ==
In 1908, as Allison neared his 44th year in Congress, and his 80th birthday, he sought a record seventh term in the Senate. However, Iowa's Republican Governor at the time, Albert B. Cummins, had aspired to become a U.S. Senator for several years, and as leader of Republican progressives had targeted his party's "old guard" for retirement or (if necessary) defeat. After seeming to promise that he would not challenge Allison in 1908, Cummins ran against Allison for the Republican nomination in the state's first-ever congressional primary on June 2, 1908. Much like Allison's 1873 race for the Senate against incumbent Harlan, Cummins' 1908 race for the Senate against incumbent Allison was very acrimonious. However, this time the incumbent prevailed; Allison won a clear victory over Cummins by over ten thousand votes. As a reflection of the nature of its preference for Allison over Cummins, the Ames Times reported the primary results under a two-level banner headline simply stating "GLORY TO GOD!"

== Death and legacy ==
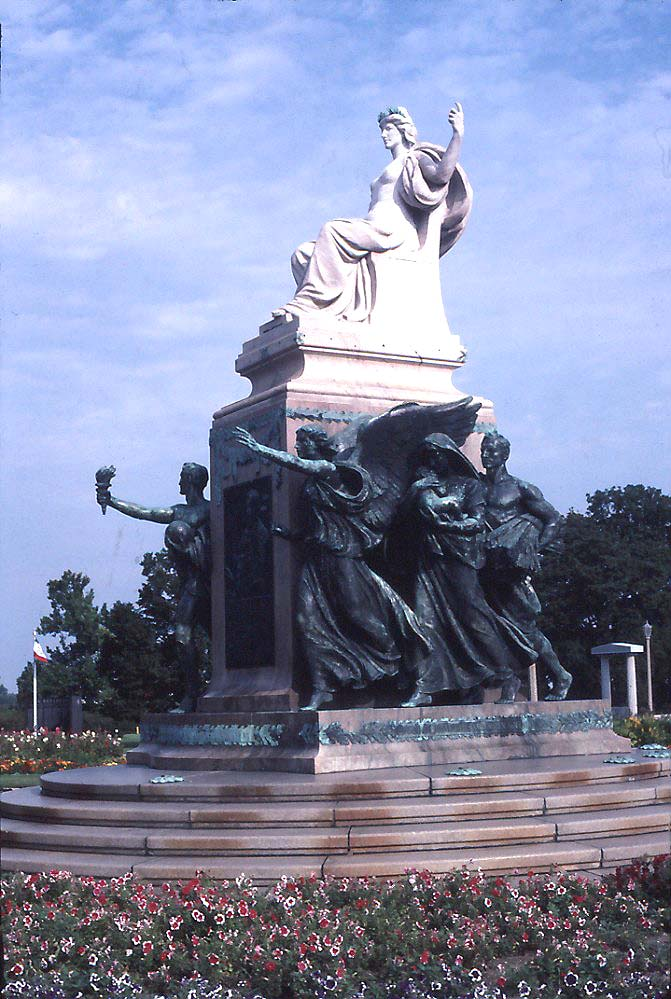
Sen. William Boyd Allison Monument, Des Moines, Iowa, 1916

Allison did not live to see the 1908 general election or a seventh term. Two months after his primary win, he died in Dubuque. Many were surprised by his death, but news reports soon indicated that he had been under constant medical care for more than two years and that those familiar with his condition had expected his death. He was interred in Linwood Cemetery, in Dubuque.

Governor Cummins was elected by the legislature to fill the unexpired term of Senator Allison and for the term beginning March 4, 1909. He was re-elected in 1914 and 1920 but in June 1926 lost in the Republican primary to Smith W. Brookhart. Cummins died shortly after his loss in the primary.

Allison was the namesake of Allison, Iowa, the county seat of Butler County.

The Allison-Henderson Park in Dubuque was named in honor of Allison and a fellow Dubuque icon, US House Speaker David B. Henderson.

There is an imposing memorial to Allison by sculptor Evelyn Beatrice Longman on the grounds of the Iowa State Capitol in Des Moines.

== See also ==
- List of members of the United States Congress who died in office (1900–1949)

U.S. House of Representatives
Preceded by (none)	Member of the U.S. House of Representatives from Iowa's 3rd congressional district March 4, 1863 – March 3, 1871	Succeeded by William G. Donnan
U.S. Senate
Preceded by James Harlan	U.S. senator (Class 3) from Iowa; March 4, 1873 – August 4, 1908; Served alongside: George G. Wright, Samuel J. Kirkwood, James W. McDill, James F. Wilson, John H. Gear, Jonathan P. Dolliver	Succeeded by Albert B. Cummins
Honorary titles
Preceded by Justin S. Morrill	Dean of the United States Senate; December 28, 1898 – August 4, 1908	Succeeded by Eugene Hale
