= Harlan–Lincoln House =

Historic house in Iowa, United States

- U.S. National Register of Historic Places
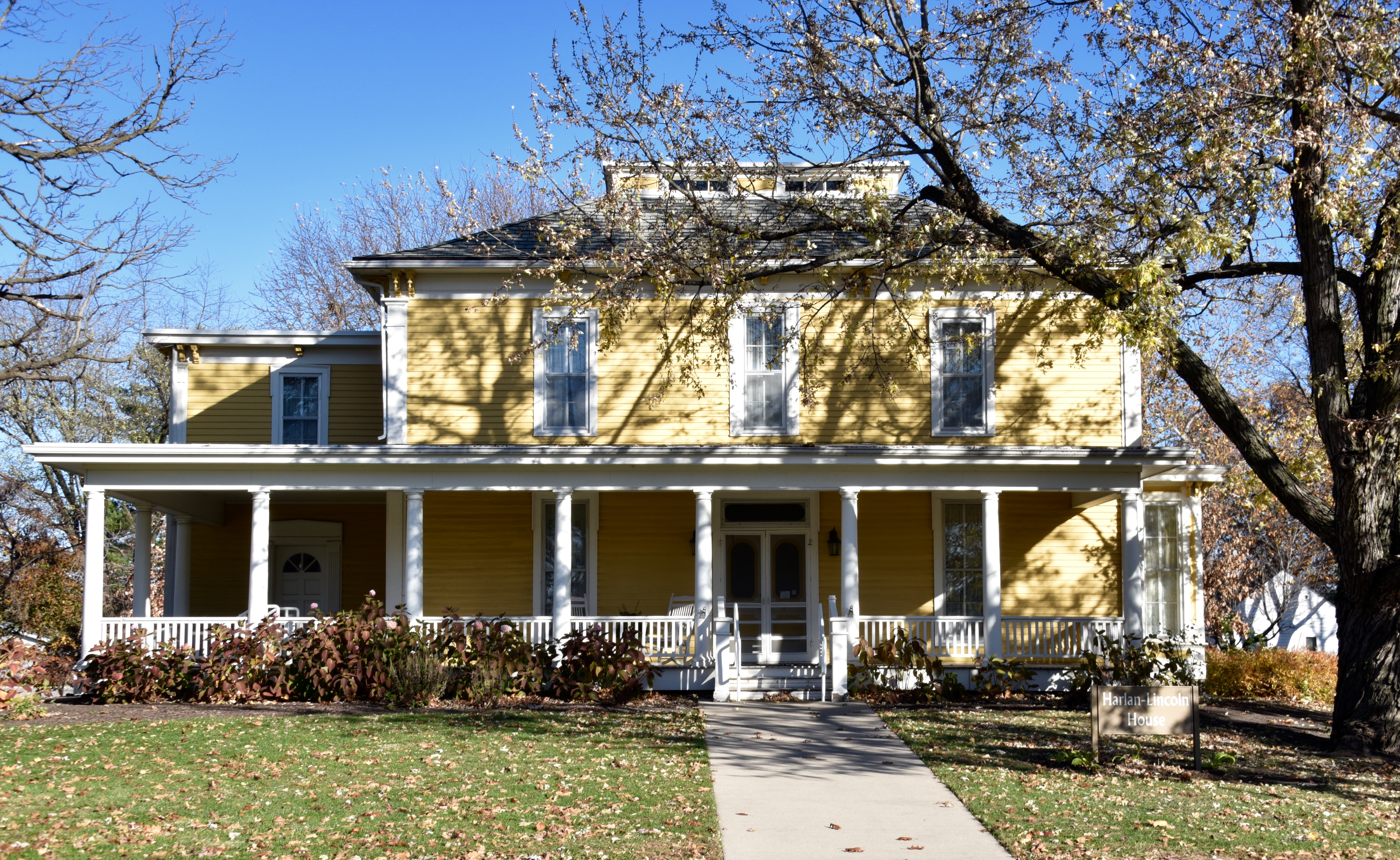

- Location within Iowa Location within the United States
- Location: 101 W. Broad St. Mount Pleasant, Iowa
- Coordinates: 40°58′18″N 91°32′57″W
- Built: 1854
- Architectural style: Italianate
- NRHP reference No.: 73000726
- Added to NRHP: May 25, 1973

The Harlan–Lincoln House is a historic structure located on the Iowa Wesleyan College campus in Mount Pleasant, Iowa, United States. It is now a museum that houses memorabilia from the families of Senator James Harlan and President Abraham Lincoln, who are associated with the house.

== History ==
Built in 1854, the house was built for James Harlan who served as the college's president from 1853 to 1855 and again from 1869 to 1870. Harlan was president when the school's name was changed from Mt. Pleasant Collegiate Institute to Iowa Wesleyan University. He maintained his home here after he resigned as college president to become one of the U.S. senators from Iowa and then Secretary of the Interior during the administration of Andrew Johnson. Harlan retired to the house in 1876 and lived there until his death in 1899. The house passed to his daughter Mary Harlan Lincoln, who had married Robert Todd Lincoln, son of Abraham Lincoln. She donated the house to Iowa Wesleyan in 1907. It has served as the president's house, and administrative building and it housed the art department. The house was listed on the National Register of Historic Places in 1973.

The Harlan–Lincoln House now serves as a museum that contains memorabilia from both the Harlan and Lincoln families. Mary Todd Lincoln’s mourning veil, a collar fragment believed to be from the coat President Lincoln wore when was assassinated, a desk used by Senator Harlan and a rock collection from Abraham Lincoln II are all part of the collection.
