= James Harlan (Iowa politician) =

American politician and lawyer

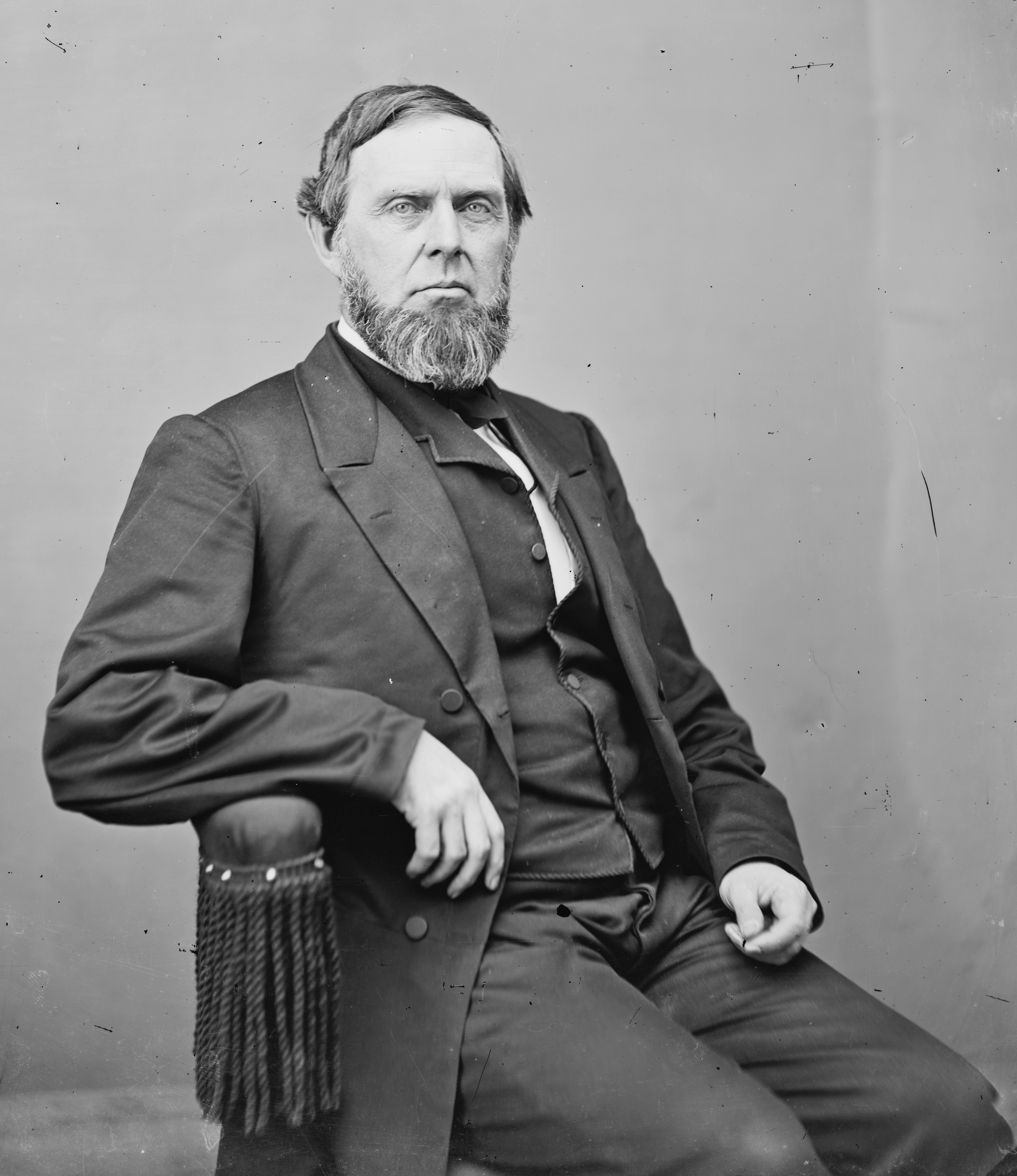

United States Senator from Iowa
- In office March 4, 1867 – March 3, 1873
- Preceded by: Samuel J. Kirkwood
- Succeeded by: William B. Allison
- In office January 29, 1857 – May 15, 1865
- Preceded by: Vacant
- Succeeded by: Samuel J. Kirkwood
- In office March 4, 1855 – January 5, 1857
- Preceded by: Augustus C. Dodge
- Succeeded by: Vacant

8th United States Secretary of the Interior
- In office May 16, 1865 – August 31, 1866
- President: Andrew Johnson
- Preceded by: John Usher
- Succeeded by: Orville Browning

Personal details
- Born: August 26, 1820 Clark County, Illinois, U.S.
- Died: October 5, 1899 (aged 79) Mount Pleasant, Iowa, U.S.
- Party: Whig (Before 1855); Free Soil (1855–1857); Republican (1857–1899)
- Spouse: Ann Eliza Peck (m. 1845; died 1884)
- Children: 4, including Mary
- Education: DePauw University (BA)

James Harlan (August 26, 1820 – October 5, 1899) was an attorney and politician, a member of the United States Senate, a U.S. Cabinet Secretary at the United States Department of Interior under President Andrew Johnson, and a Federal Judge.

== Early life ==
Harlan was born on August 26, 1820, in Clark County, Illinois, and raised in Indiana. He was the son of Silas Harlan (1792–1868) and Mary (née Connolly) Harlan (1796–1896).

As a boy, Harlan attended local schools before graduating from Indiana Asbury University (now DePauw University) in 1845.

== Career ==
In 1845, he moved to Iowa City, Iowa, where he served as Superintendent of Schools. He also studied law and was admitted to the bar in 1850. He joined the Whig Party and became active in politics. In 1850, Harlan declined the Whig nomination for Governor of Iowa. From 1853 to 1855, Harlan was president of Iowa Wesleyan College in Mount Pleasant, Iowa.

=== First Senate tenure ===
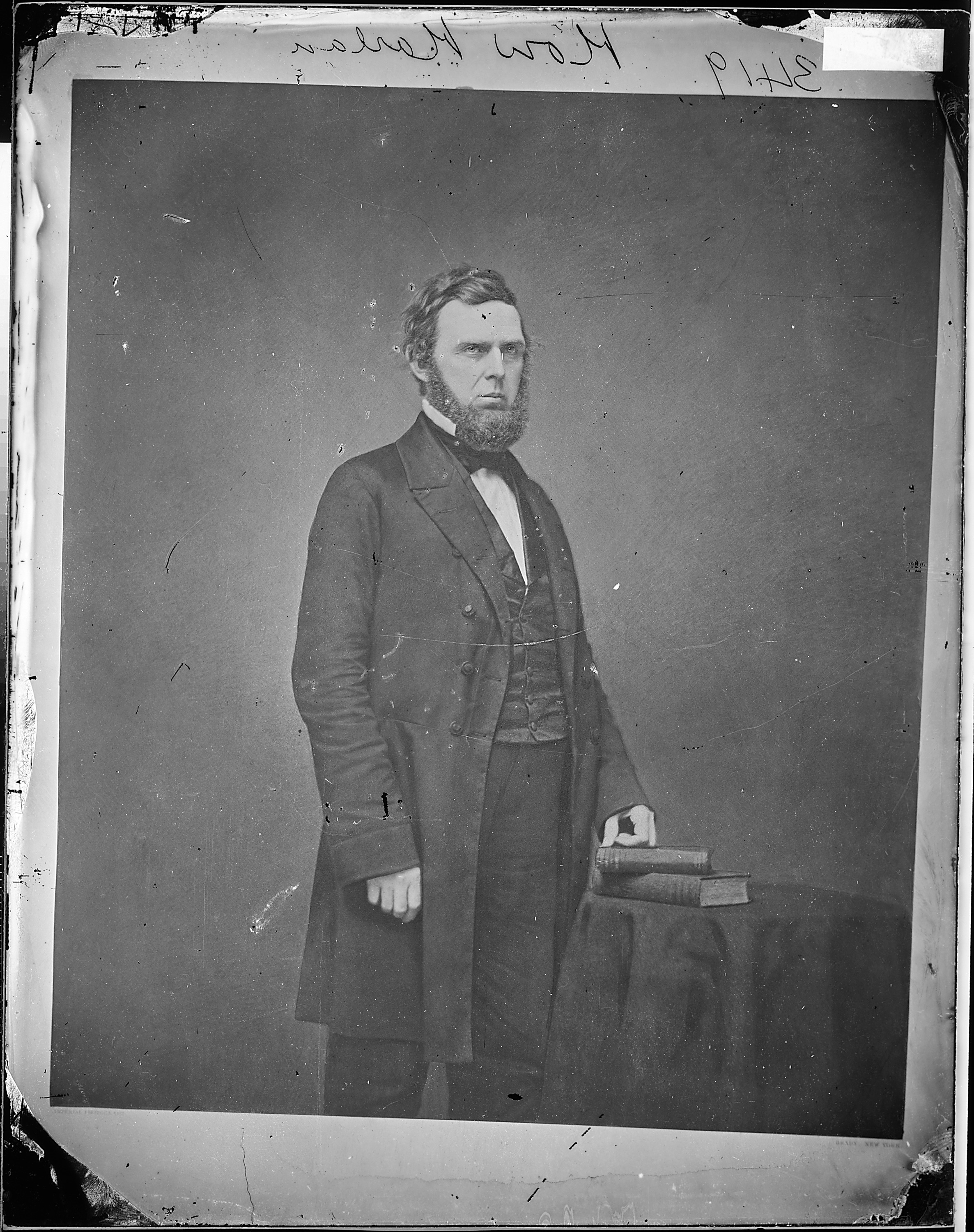
Hon. James Harlan

In 1855, Harlan was elected by the Iowa legislature to the United States Senate as a Free Soil Party candidate. In 1857, the U.S. Senate declared the seat vacant because of irregularities in that legislative election. He was re-elected by the legislature and seated as a Republican, serving until 1865. In 1861, Harlan was a Delegate to the Peace Conference that tried to arrange a compromise to prevent the American Civil War.

=== Secretary of the Interior ===
Harlan was a close friend of President Abraham Lincoln and his family. In 1865, after Lincoln's assassination, he resigned from the Senate when he was appointed as Secretary of the Interior under President Andrew Johnson, an appointment he held until 1866. As secretary he announced that he intended to "clean house" and fired "a considerable number of incumbents who were seldom at their respective desks". He had done so after requesting, in late May 1865, a report listing all employees who (1.) uttered disloyal statements since the bombardment of Fort Sumter, (2.) all those not known to entertain loyal sentiments or who had associated with those known to be disloyal, (3.) those who were inefficient or not necessary to transact public business, (4.) all such persons "as disregard in their conduct, habits, and associations, the rules of decorum, [and] propriety proscribed by a christian civilization."

Among this group was the poet Walt Whitman, then working as a clerk in the department, who received his dismissal note on June 30, 1865. Harlan had found a copy of Leaves of Grass on Whitman's desk as the poet was making revisions and found it to be morally offensive. "I will not have the author of that book in this Department", he said. "If the President of the United States should order his reinstatement, I would resign sooner than I would put him back." Twenty-nine years later, Harlan defended his firing of Whitman, saying that the clerk was dismissed solely "on the grounds that his services were not needed".

Harlan was a member of the Southern Treaty Commission that renegotiated treaties with Indian Tribes that had sided with the Confederacy, such as the Cherokee and Choctaw. As part of the new treaties, they had to emancipate their slaves, as was being done by amendment within the United States, and offer them full citizenship in the tribes if they chose to stay in Indian Territory. If they left, the freedmen would become United States citizens. (Membership issues related to the Cherokee Freedmen and Choctaw Freedmen have become significant since the late 20th century.) Harlan resigned from the post in 1866 when he no longer supported the policies of President Johnson.

=== Second Senate tenure ===
In 1867, he was elected again by the Iowa legislature to the United States Senate and served until the end of his term in January 1873. During his senate service, Harlan was chairman of the committees of Public Lands; District of Columbia; Education; and Indian Affairs. He was the lone former Johnson cabinet member who voted to convict him.

=== Later career ===
Harlan was an unsuccessful candidate for reelection in 1872, and was also an unsuccessful candidate for governor in 1895. After his Senate career ended, Harlan turned a previous house of his into the Harlan House Hotel.

From 1882 to 1886, Harlan was appointed by President Chester A. Arthur as presiding judge for the Court of Commissioners, which heard cases related to the Alabama claims.

== Personal life ==
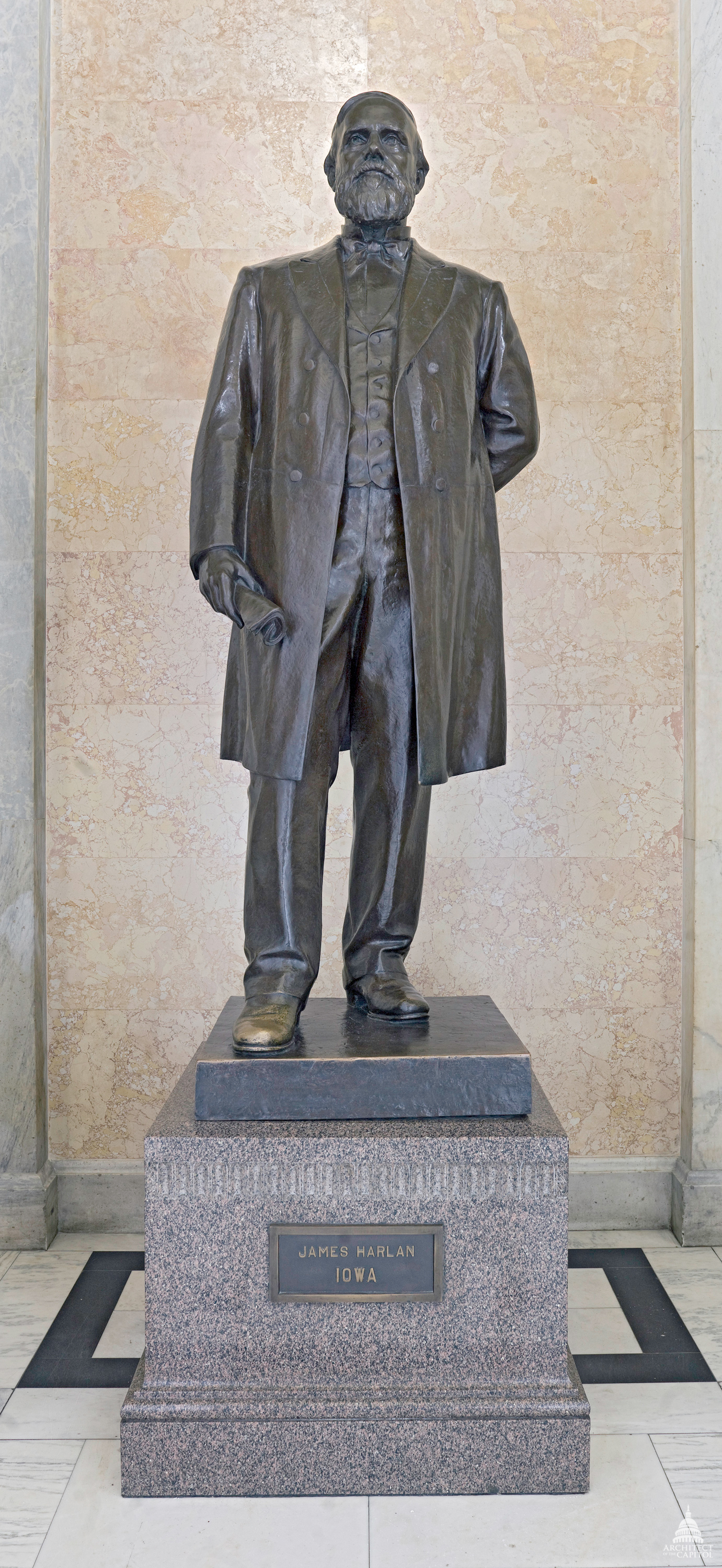
James Harlan's statue was one of two representing Iowa in the U.S. Capitol until its replacement.

On November 5, 1845, Harlan was married to Ann Eliza Peck (1824–1884) by President Matthew Simpson, who later became a bishop of the Methodist Episcopal Church. Ann was the daughter of James Peck and Eunice (née Knight) Peck, both of whom died during Cholera epidemic of 1832. Together, Ann and James were the parents of:

- Mary Eunice Harlan (1846–1937), who married Lincoln's son Robert Todd Lincoln in 1868. The couple lived during the summers at Harlan's home in Mount Pleasant.
- Silas James Harlan (1850–1850), who died in infancy.
- William Aaron Harlan (1852–1876), who was a close friend of Tad Lincoln.
- Julia Josephine Harlan (1856–1862), who died young.

Harlan died on October 5, 1899, at his hotel in Mount Pleasant, which had become his residence in the early 1890s.

=== Legacy ===
Harlan's residence, today known as the Harlan-Lincoln House, has been listed on the National Register of Historic Places. Operated as a house museum, it exhibits memorabilia from both the Harlan and Lincoln families. The Harlan House Hotel is also listed on the National Register of Historic Places.

A commemorative sculpture of Harlan resided in the United States Capitol, along with one of pioneer Iowa Governor Samuel Kirkwood (each state may install two statues for display in the Capitol). The Harlan statue was located in the Hall of Columns until it was replaced in 2014 by a statue of Norman Borlaug. The Harlan statue is now on display at Iowa Wesleyan College.

The city of Harlan, Iowa, in Shelby County was named for him.

U.S. Senate
Preceded by Augustus C. Dodge	U.S. Senator (Class 3) from Iowa; 1855–1857; Served alongside: George Wallace Jones	Succeeded by Himself
Preceded by Himself	U.S. Senator (Class 3) from Iowa; 1857–1865; Served alongside: George Wallace Jones, James W. Grimes	Succeeded by Samuel J. Kirkwood
Preceded by Robert Johnson	Chair of the Senate Public Lands Committee; 1861–1865	Succeeded by Samuel Pomeroy
Preceded by Samuel J. Kirkwood	U.S. Senator (Class 3) from Iowa; 1867–1873; Served alongside: James W. Grimes, James B. Howell, George G. Wright	Succeeded by William B. Allison
New office	Chair of the Senate Education Committee; 1869	Succeeded by Charles D. Drake
Preceded by John B. Henderson	Chair of the Senate Indian Affairs Committee; 1869–1873	Succeeded by William Alfred Buckingham
Political offices
Preceded by John Usher	United States Secretary of the Interior; 1865–1866	Succeeded by Orville Browning
