= James W. Grimes =

American politician (1816–1872)

James Wilson Grimes
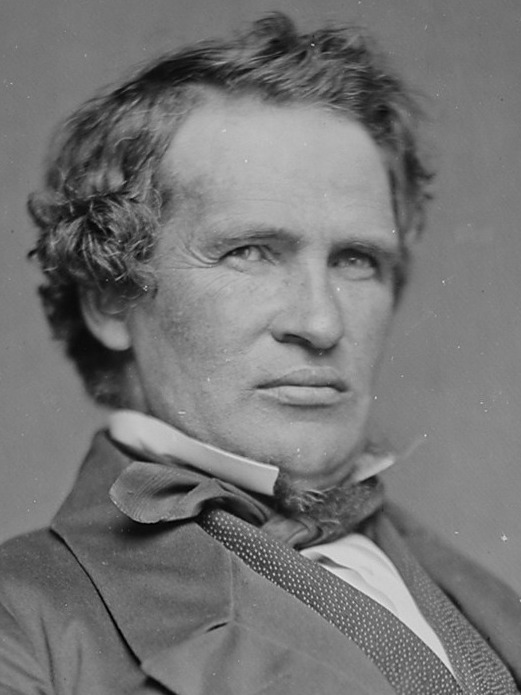

United States Senator from Iowa
- In office March 4, 1859 – December 6, 1869
- Preceded by: George Wallace Jones
- Succeeded by: James B. Howell

3rd Governor of Iowa
- In office December 9, 1854 – January 13, 1858
- Preceded by: Stephen P. Hempstead
- Succeeded by: Ralph P. Lowe

Member of the Iowa Territorial House of Representatives
- In office 1838–1839
- In office 1843-1844

Personal details
- Born: October 20, 1816 Deering, New Hampshire, U.S.
- Died: February 7, 1872 (aged 55) Burlington, Iowa, U.S.
- Resting place: Aspen Grove Cemetery
- Party: Whig (until 1855); Republican (after 1855)
- Education: Dartmouth College
- Profession: Politician; lawyer

James Wilson Grimes (October 20, 1816 – February 7, 1872) was an American politician, serving as the third governor of Iowa and a United States Senator from Iowa.

== Biography ==
Born in Deering, New Hampshire, on Oct 20, 1816, Grimes was the son of John Grimes (b. Aug 11, 1772) and Elizabeth Wilson (b. Mar 19, 1773). He graduated from Hampton Academy and attended Dartmouth College. He studied law, moved west and commenced practice in a settlement in 'Black Hawk Purchase', Wisconsin Territory, that was later incorporated as Burlington, Iowa. He also farmed.

== Political career ==
Grimes served as a member of the Iowa Territorial House of Representatives for the 1838–1839 and 1843–1844 terms. He served as Governor of Iowa from 1854 to 1858. While elected as a Whig in 1854, he was a leader in the Republican Party's establishment in Iowa in 1855 and 1856.

=== Iowa Governor ===
Grimes armed abolitionists, turning over part or all of a shipment of 1500 rifles. John Brown trained his militia of 200 men in Springville, Iowa, near the state capital in Iowa City, under Grimes tenure, raiding Kansas and Missouri.

=== U.S. Senate ===
Grimes was elected as a Republican to the U.S. Senate in 1859 and reelected in 1865. He served in the Senate from March 4, 1859, until December 6, 1869, when he resigned due to ill health.

In the Senate, he served as chairman of the Committee on the District of Columbia (in the 37th and 38th Congresses), and the Committee on Naval Affairs (in the 39th through 41st Congresses). He also served on the Joint Committee on Reconstruction which drafted the Fourteenth Amendment to the United States Constitution.

In 1861, Grimes was a member of the peace convention held in Washington, D.C., in an effort to devise means to prevent the impending Civil War. In December 1861, he introduced the senate bill which led to the creation of the Medal of Honor (initially only for Navy and Marine personnel).

During President Andrew Johnson's impeachment trial, Grimes broke party ranks, along with six other Republican senators and voted for acquittal. Senators William Pitt Fessenden, Joseph S. Fowler, Grimes, John B. Henderson, Lyman Trumbull, Peter G. Van Winkle, and Edmund G. Ross of Kansas, who provided the decisive vote, defied their party and public opinion and voted against convicting Johnson because they were disturbed by how the proceedings had been manipulated in order to give a one-sided presentation of the evidence. They were joined in bucking their party by three other Republican senators, James Dixon, James Rood Doolittle, Daniel Sheldon Norton After the trial, Congressman Benjamin Butler conducted hearings on the widespread reports that Republican senators had been bribed to vote for Johnson's acquittal. In Butler's hearings, and in subsequent inquiries, there was increasing evidence that some acquittal votes were acquired by promises of patronage jobs and cash cards.

In 1869, after suffering a stroke, Grimes formally resigned from the Senate on December 6, 1869.

== Death and legacy ==
Grimes died in Burlington on February 7, 1872, aged 55. He is buried in the Aspen Grove Cemetery in Burlington.

The plot of land that his home was once located on is now home to an elementary school that bears his name.

The town of Grimes, Iowa, is named for Grimes, as well as the Grimes State Office Building in Des Moines.

Party political offices
Preceded by James L. Thompson	Whig nominee Governor of Iowa; 1854	Succeeded by None
Political offices
Preceded by Stephen P. Hempstead	Governor of Iowa; 1854–1858	Succeeded by Ralph P. Lowe
U.S. Senate
Preceded by George Wallace Jones	U.S. senator (Class 2) from Iowa; March 4, 1859 – December 6, 1869; Served alongside: James Harlan, Samuel J. Kirkwood and James Harlan	Succeeded by James B. Howell
