= Index of Iowa-related articles =

The location of the state of Iowa in the United States of America

The following is an alphabetical list of articles related to the state of Iowa.

== 0–9 ==
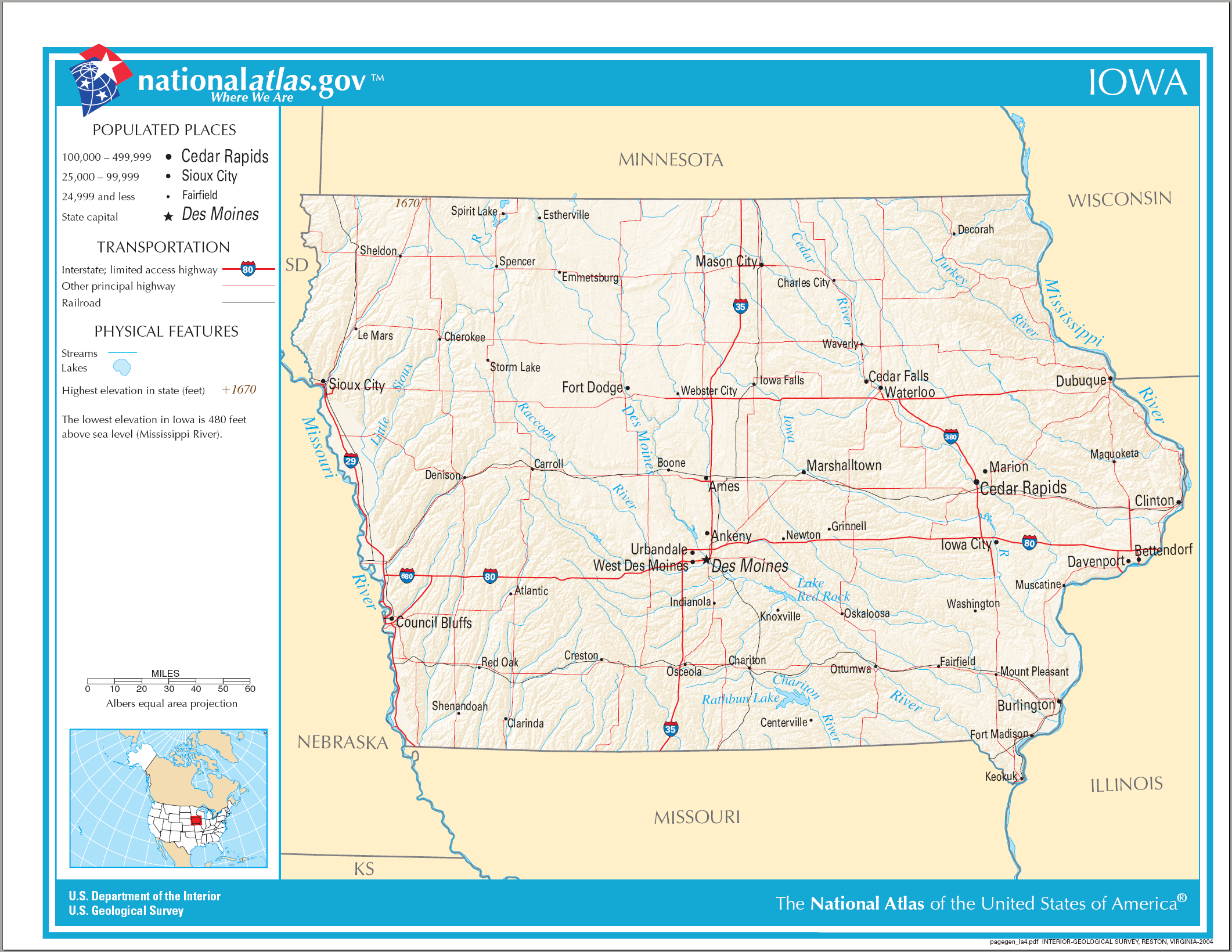
An enlargeable map of the state of Iowa

- .ia.us – Internet second-level domain for the state of Iowa
- 34th Infantry Division (United States)
- 35th Iowa Volunteer Infantry Regiment

== A ==
- Abortion in Iowa
- Adjacent states:
  - State of Illinois
  - State of Minnesota
  - State of Missouri
  - State of Nebraska
  - State of South Dakota
  - State of Wisconsin
- Agriculture in Iowa
- Airports in Iowa
- Amusement parks in Iowa
- Animal Rescue League of Iowa
- Aquaria in Iowa
  - commons:Category:Aquaria in Iowa
- Arboreta in Iowa
  - commons:Category:Arboreta in Iowa
- Archaeology of Iowa
  - Category:Archaeological sites in Iowa
    - commons:Category:Archaeological sites in Iowa
- Architecture of Iowa
- Area codes in Iowa
- Art museums and galleries in Iowa
  - commons:Category:Art museums and galleries in Iowa
- Astronomical observatories in Iowa
  - commons:Category:Astronomical observatories in Iowa
- Auto trails in Iowa

== B ==
- Birds of Iowa
- Black Hawk War
- Botanical gardens in Iowa
  - commons:Category:Botanical gardens in Iowa
- Buildings and structures in Iowa
  - commons:Category:Buildings and structures in Iowa
- Burlington, Iowa, capital of Wisconsin Territory 1837–1838, capital of Iowa Territory 1838-1841

== C ==
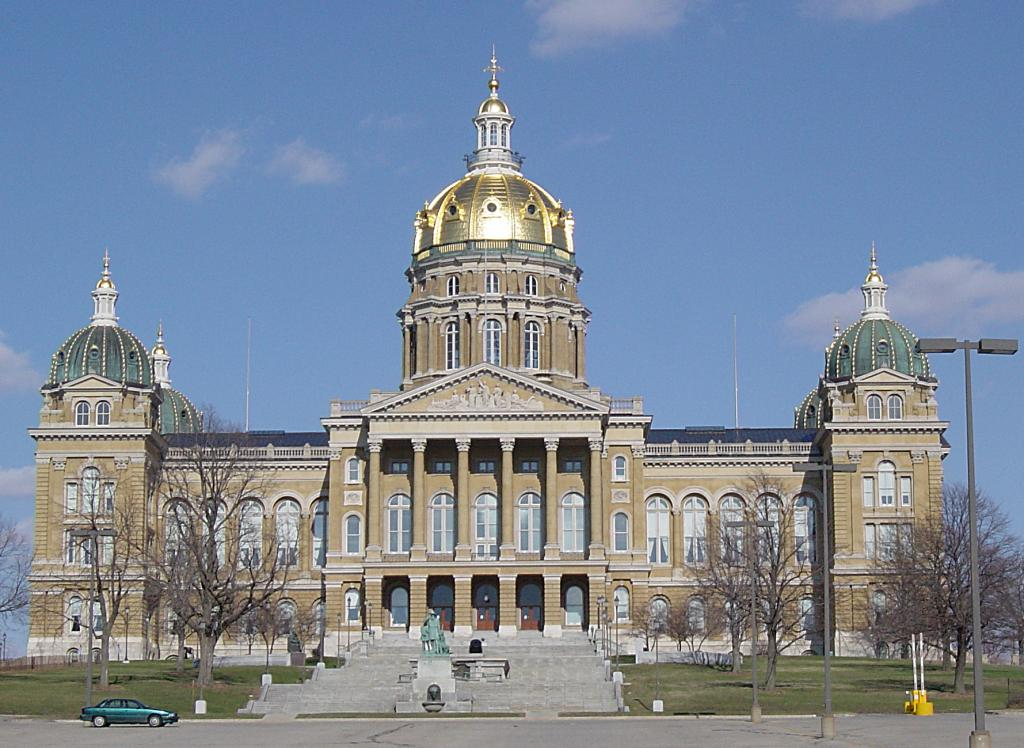
The Iowa State Capitol in Des Moines

- Caitlin Clark effect
- Capital of the State of Iowa
- Casinos in Iowa
- Caves of Iowa
  - commons:Category:Caves of Iowa
- Census statistical areas of Iowa
- Cities in Iowa
  - commons:Category:Cities in Iowa
- Climate of Iowa
- Climate change in Iowa
- Colleges and universities in Iowa
  - commons:Category:Universities and colleges in Iowa
- Communications in Iowa
  - commons:Category:Communications in Iowa

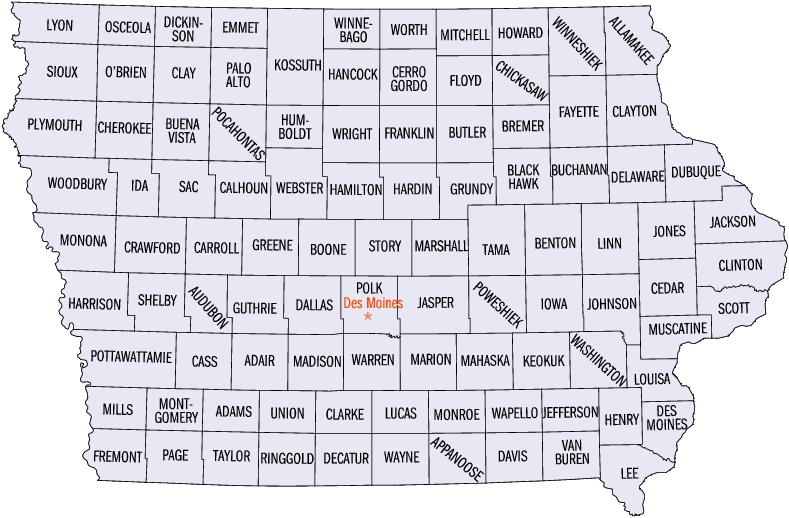
An enlargeable map of the 99 counties of the State of Iowa

- Companies in Iowa
- Congressional districts of Iowa
- Convention centers in Iowa
  - commons:Category:Convention centers in Iowa
- Counties of the State of Iowa
  - commons:Category:Counties in Iowa
- Culture of Iowa
  - commons:Category:Iowa culture

== D ==
- Demographics of Iowa
- Des Moines, Iowa, state capital since 1857

== E ==
- Economy of Iowa
  - Category:Economy of Iowa
    - commons:Category:Economy of Iowa
- Education in Iowa
  - Category:Education in Iowa
    - commons:Category:Education in Iowa
- Elections in Iowa
  - Category:Elections in Iowa
    - commons:Category:Elections in Iowa
- Environment of Iowa
  - commons:Category:Environment of Iowa

== F ==
The flag of the state of Iowa

- Festivals in Iowa
  - commons:Category:Festivals in Iowa
- Flag of the state of Iowa

== G ==
The Great Seal of the State of Iowa

- Geography of Iowa
  - Category:Geography of Iowa
    - commons:Category:Geography of Iowa
- Geology of Iowa
  - Category:Geology of Iowa
    - commons:Category:Geology of Iowa
- Ghost towns in Iowa
  - Category:Ghost towns in Iowa
    - commons:Category:Ghost towns in Iowa
- Government of the state of Iowa website
  - Category:Government of Iowa
    - commons:Category:Government of Iowa
- Governor of the State of Iowa
  - List of governors of Iowa
- Great Seal of the State of Iowa

== H ==
- Heritage railroads in Iowa
  - commons:Category:Heritage railroads in Iowa
- High schools of Iowa
- Higher education in Iowa
- Highway routes in Iowa
- Hiking trails in Iowa
  - commons:Category:Hiking trails in Iowa
- History of Iowa
  - Historical outline of Iowa
    - Category:History of Iowa
      - commons:Category:History of Iowa
  - National Register of Historic Places listings in Iowa
  - List of National Historic Landmarks in Iowa
- Honey War
- Hospitals in Iowa
- House of Representatives of the State of Iowa

== I ==
- IA – United States Postal Service postal code for the state of Iowa
- Images of Iowa
  - commons:Category:Iowa
- Interstate highway routes in Iowa
- Invasion Iowa
- Iowa website
  - Category:Iowa
    - commons:Category:Iowa
      - commons:Category:Maps of Iowa
- Iowa Animal Industry Bureau
- Iowa Army Ammunition Plant
- Iowa Air National Guard
- Iowa Army National Guard
- Iowa Biennial
- Iowa City, Iowa, territorial and state capital 1841-1857
- Iowa Communications Network
- Iowa Employer Benefits Study
- Iowa Farmer Today
- Iowa Interstate Railroad
- Iowa Nation (Native American)
- Iowa Old Capitol Building
- Iowa Sports Foundation
- Iowa State Capitol
  - commons:Category:Iowa State Capitol
- Iowa State Patrol
- Iowa Territory
- Iowan erosion surface
- Islands in Iowa

== L ==
- Lakes of Iowa
  - commons:Category:Lakes of Iowa
- Landmarks in Iowa
  - commons:Category:Landmarks in Iowa
- Lieutenant Governor of the State of Iowa
- Lists related to the state of Iowa:
  - List of airports in Iowa
  - List of birds of Iowa
  - List of census statistical areas in Iowa
  - List of cities in Iowa
  - List of colleges and universities in Iowa
  - List of United States congressional districts in Iowa
  - List of counties in Iowa
  - List of dams and reservoirs in Iowa
  - List of ghost towns in Iowa
  - List of governors of Iowa
  - List of high schools in Iowa
  - List of highway routes in Iowa
  - List of hospitals in Iowa
  - List of Interstate highway routes in Iowa
  - List of islands in Iowa
  - List of lakes in Iowa
  - List of law enforcement agencies in Iowa
  - List of museums in Iowa
  - List of National Historic Landmarks in Iowa
  - List of newspapers in Iowa
  - List of people from Iowa
  - List of power stations in Iowa
  - List of radio stations in Iowa
  - List of railroads in Iowa
  - List of Registered Historic Places in Iowa
  - List of rivers of Iowa
  - List of school districts in Iowa
  - List of sports teams from Iowa
  - List of state forests in Iowa
  - List of state parks in Iowa
  - List of state preserves in Iowa
  - List of state prisons in Iowa
  - List of symbols of the State of Iowa
  - List of telephone area codes in Iowa
  - List of television stations in Iowa
  - List of Iowa's congressional delegations
  - List of United States congressional districts in Iowa
  - List of United States representatives from Iowa
  - List of United States senators from Iowa
  - List of U.S. highway routes in Iowa
  - Louisiana Purchase of 1803

== M ==
- Maps of Iowa
  - commons:Category:Maps of Iowa
- Mass media in Iowa
- Miss Iowa
- Mississippi River
- Missouri River
- Mormon Trail
- Museums in Iowa
  - Category:Museums in Iowa
    - commons:Category:Museums in Iowa
- Music of Iowa
  - commons:Category:Music of Iowa
  - Category:Musical groups from Iowa
  - Category:Musicians from Iowa

== N ==
- Natural gas pipelines in Iowa
- Natural history of Iowa
  - commons:Category:Natural history of Iowa
- Newspapers of Iowa

== P ==
- People from Iowa
  - Category:People from Iowa
    - commons:Category:People from Iowa
    - Category:People from Iowa by populated place
    - Category:People from Iowa by county
    - Category:People from Iowa by occupation
- Politics of Iowa
  - commons:Category:Politics of Iowa
- Pookey Bleum
- Portal:Iowa
- Prehistory of Iowa
- Protected areas of Iowa
  - commons:Category:Protected areas of Iowa

== Q ==
- Quad Cities

== R ==
- Radio stations in Iowa
- RAGBRAI
- Railroads in Iowa
- Registered historic places in Iowa
  - commons:Category:Registered Historic Places in Iowa
- Religion in Iowa
  - Category:Religion in Iowa
    - commons:Category:Religion in Iowa
- Rivers of Iowa
  - commons:Category:Rivers of Iowa

== S ==
- School districts of Iowa
- Scouting in Iowa
- Senate of the State of Iowa
- Settlements in Iowa
  - Cities in Iowa
  - Towns in Iowa
  - Townships in Iowa
  - Census Designated Places in Iowa
  - Other unincorporated communities in Iowa
  - List of ghost towns in Iowa
- Solar power in Iowa
- Sports in Iowa
  - Sports teams from Iowa
  - Category:Sports in Iowa
    - commons:Category:Sports in Iowa
  - Category:Sports venues in Iowa
    - commons:Category:Sports venues in Iowa
- State Capitol of Iowa
- State of Iowa website
  - Constitution of the State of Iowa
  - Government of the State of Iowa
    - Category:Government of Iowa
      - commons:Category:Government of Iowa
  - Executive branch of the government of the State of Iowa
    - Governor of the State of Iowa
  - Legislative branch of the government of the State of Iowa
    - General Assembly of the State of Iowa
      - Senate of the State of Iowa
      - House of Representatives of the State of Iowa
  - Judicial branch of the government of the State of Iowa
    - Supreme Court of the State of Iowa
    - Iowa District Courts
- State parks of Iowa
  - commons:Category:State parks of Iowa
- State prisons of Iowa
- Structures in Iowa
  - commons:Category:Buildings and structures in Iowa
- Supreme Court of the State of Iowa
- Symbols of the State of Iowa
  - Category:Symbols of Iowa
    - commons:Category:Symbols of Iowa

== T ==
- Telecommunications in Iowa
  - commons:Category:Communications in Iowa
- Telephone area codes in Iowa
- Television shows set in Iowa
- Television stations in Iowa
- Theatres in Iowa
  - commons:Category:Theatres in Iowa
- Territory of Iowa, 1838–1846
- Territory of Michigan, 1805-(1834–1836)-1837
- Territory of Louisiana, 1805–1812
- Territory of Missouri, 1812–1821
- Territory of Wisconsin, (1836–1838)-1848
- Tourism in Iowa website
  - commons:Category:Tourism in Iowa
- Transportation in Iowa
  - Category:Transportation in Iowa
    - commons:Category:Transport in Iowa

== U ==
- United States of America
  - States of the United States of America
  - United States census statistical areas of Iowa
  - Iowa's congressional delegations
  - United States congressional districts in Iowa
  - United States Court of Appeals for the Eighth Circuit
  - United States District Court for the Northern District of Iowa
  - United States District Court for the Southern District of Iowa
  - United States representatives from Iowa
  - United States senators from Iowa
- Universities and colleges in Iowa
  - commons:Category:Universities and colleges in Iowa
- U.S. highway routes in Iowa
- US-IA – ISO 3166-2:US region code for the State of Iowa

== W ==
- Water parks in Iowa
  Wikimedia
  - Wikimedia Commons:Category:Iowa
    - commons:Category:Maps of Iowa
  - Wikinews:Category:Iowa
    - Wikinews:Portal:Iowa
  - Wikipedia Category:Iowa
    - Wikipedia Portal:Iowa
    - Wikipedia:WikiProject Iowa
      - Category:WikiProject Iowa
- Wind power in Iowa

== Z ==
- Zoos in Iowa
  - commons:Category:Zoos in Iowa

== See also ==
- Topic overview:
  - Iowa
  - Outline of Iowa
