= Colorado sports teams =

List of teams

The following is a list of the professional sports teams that have played games and been based in the state of Colorado:

== Baseball ==
=== Major League Baseball ===
- Colorado Rockies

=== Minor League Baseball ===
==== American Association ====
- Denver Zephyrs (previously the Denver Bears; also played in the Pacific Coast League. Moved to New Orleans; now play as the Wichita Wind Surge)

==== Pioneer League ====
- Grand Junction Jackalopes Based in Grand Junction, CO. Formerly Grand Junction Rockies, renamed in 2022.(defunct)
- Rocky Mountain Vibes Based in Colorado Springs, CO. (defunct)
- Northern Colorado Owlz Based in Windsor, CO. Formerly Orem Owlz, relocated from Orem, UT in 2022. (defunct)

==== Pacific Coast League ====
- Colorado Springs Sky Sox AAA League for Milwaukee Brewers (now play as the San Antonio Missions)
- Denver Bears (Relocated from Kansas City. Also played in American Association; later became the Denver Zephyrs)

==== Texas-Louisiana League ====
- Pueblo Bighorns (defunct)

==== Western League ====
- Colorado Springs Sky Sox (Western League) (defunct)
- Denver Bears (Western League) (defunct; replaced by the new Denver Bears team)

== Basketball ==
=== American Basketball Association ===
- Denver Rockets (now play in the National Basketball Association as the Denver Nuggets)
- Colorado Kings Based in Denver, CO (defunct)
- Colorado Cougars Based in Greeley, CO (defunct)
- Colorado Crusaders Based in Colorado Springs, CO (defunct)

=== American Basketball League ===
- Colorado Xplosion (defunct)

=== National Basketball Association ===
- Denver Nuggets (also played in American Basketball Association; also known as Denver Rockets)
- Denver Nuggets (1948-1950) (also played in the American Basketball League, National Basketball League, Amateur Athletic Association, and National Professional Basketball League) (defunct)

=== National Women's Basketball League ===
- Colorado Chill (defunct)

=== Minor League Basketball ===
==== American Basketball Association ====
- Colorado Storm (defunct)

==== International Basketball Association ====
- Aurora Cavalry (defunct)
- Colorado Crossover (defunct)

==== National Basketball Association Development League ====
- Colorado 14ers (now play as the Texas Legends)

== Football ==
=== Arena Football League ===
- Colorado Springs Crush (defunct)
- Denver Dynamite (defunct)

=== Colorado Football Conference ===
- Mile High Eagles (Formerly Englewood Eagles and Colorado Cobras)
- Northern Colorado Nightmare
- Pueblo Steel
- Colorado Springs Flames
- 303 Thrashers (Formerly Denver Pirates)
- Colorado 76ers
- Inactive or Defunct Teams Below
- Colorado Springs Cyclones (Defunct)
- Denver Dynasty (Defunct)
- Mile High Grizzlies (Defunct)
- Colorado Stealth (Defunct)
- North Metro Thunder (Defunct)
- Northern Colorado Wolfpack (Defunct)
- Metro State Roadrunners (MSU)
- Colorado Springs Mountain Lions (UCCS)
- Denver Sharks
- Pueblo Steel
- Metropolitan Wolverines
- Colorado Bulldogs
- Colorado Springs Generals
- Rocky Mountain Reapers
- Mile High Knights
- North Metro Red Raiders
- Denver Titans
- Greeley Stampede
- Ft Collins Stars
- Greeley Blaze
- Denver Bulls
- Denver Sharks
- Grand Junction Outlaws
- Colorado Springs Raptors
- Rocky Mountain Raptors
- Broomfield D.A.W.G.S.

=== Indoor Football League ===
- Colorado Crush (IFL) (previously the Colorado Ice; also played in United Indoor Football) (defunct)

=== Indoor Professional Football League ===
- Rocky Mountain Thunder (defunct)

=== Legends Football League ===
- Denver Dream (defunct)

=== National Football League ===
- Denver Broncos (Also played in the American Football League)

=== National Indoor Football League ===
- Colorado Venom (defunct)
- Denver Aviators (defunct)

=== Professional Indoor Football League ===
- Colorado Wildcats (defunct)

=== United Indoor Football ===
- Colorado Ice (later became the Colorado Crush; also played in Indoor Football League) (defunct)

=== United States Football League ===
- Denver Gold (defunct)

=== American Professional Football League II ===
- Grand Junction Gladiators

== Hockey ==
=== National Hockey League ===
- Colorado Avalanche (moved from Quebec)
- Colorado Rockies (moved to New Jersey)

=== World Hockey Association ===
- Denver Spurs (moved to Ottawa; defunct) (also played in Western Hockey League and Central Hockey League)

=== Minor League Hockey ===
==== Central Hockey League ====
- Colorado Eagles
- Colorado Flames (defunct)
- Denver Spurs (also played in Western Hockey League and World Hockey Association) (moved to Ottawa; defunct)
- Rocky Mountain Rage (defunct)
- Denver Cutthroats (defunct)

==== International Hockey League ====
- Denver Grizzlies (moved to Utah; now play as the Cleveland Monsters in the American Hockey League)
- Denver Mavericks (moved to Minneapolis; defunct)
- Denver Rangers (moved to Phoenix; defunct) (also known as Colorado Rangers)

==== United States Hockey League ====
- Denver Falcons (defunct)

==== West Coast Hockey League ====
- Colorado Gold Kings (moved from Alaska; defunct)

==== Western Hockey League ====
- Denver Invaders (moved from Spokane) (moved to Victoria; defunct)
- Denver Spurs (also played in Central Hockey League and World Hockey Association) (moved to Ottawa; defunct)

== Lacrosse ==
=== Premier League Lacrosse ===
- Denver Outlaws

=== National Lacrosse League ===
- Colorado Mammoth

== Rugby ==
=== Major League Rugby ===
- Colorado Raptors (previously the Glendale Raptors; defunct)

=== Division I Men ===
- Glendale Merlins

=== Elite Women's Rugby ===
- Denver Onyx

=== Division I Women ===
- Glendale Merlins

== Soccer ==
=== Major League Soccer ===
- Colorado Rapids

=== National Women’s Soccer League ===
- Denver Summit

=== North American Soccer League ===
- Colorado Caribous (moved to Atlanta; defunct)
- Denver Dynamos (moved to Minnesota; defunct)

=== Professional Arena Soccer League ===
- Denver Dynamite (defunct)

=== Minor League Soccer ===
==== A-League ====
- Colorado Foxes (moved to San Diego; defunct)

==== Major Soccer League ====
- Denver Avalanche (defunct)

==== United Soccer League ====
- Colorado Springs Switchbacks FC

==== Major Arena Soccer League ====
- Colorado Blizzard
- Colorado Inferno

== Australian Rules Football ==
=== Men's ===
- Denver Bulldogs

=== Women's ===
- Denver Bulldogs
- Centennial Tigers
