= Aurora Cavalry =

Former basketball team

- Founded: 2005
- League: IBL 2006-2006
- Team history: Aurora Cavalry; 2006-2006
- Based in: Aurora, Colorado
- Arena: Gateway High School
- Colors: Blue, Gold
- Owner: Dirk Speyer
- Head coach: Dejon Jernagin (2006), A.B. Maxey (2006)
- Championships: 0

The Aurora Cavalry is a defunct basketball team from the International Basketball League. They were based in Aurora, Colorado and played only one season in 2006. The team played its home games in a local high school gymnasium.

== Cavalry players ==
Aurora Cavalry Roster
G/F	6'5	Brian Barthule	(Adams State College)
G	6'7	Jamar Bohanon	(Metropolitan State College)
F	6'9	Jamar Brown	(Colorado State University - Pueblo)
F	6'4	Mike Buggs	(University of Colorado)
G	6'0	Ricky de Aragon	(Northern Arizona University)
F	6'6	Sneed Deaderick	(DePaul University)
G/F	6'6	Jon Gaines	(Cal State Bakersfield)
G	6'0	Nick Graham	(Washington State University)
F	6'5	Aaron Green	(University of Missouri–St. Louis)
F	6'8	Phillip Hillstock	(Barber-Scotia College)
F/C	6'8	Marquis Holmes	(University of Idaho)
G	5'11	Lamar Karim	(Southern Polytechnic State University)
F	6'5	Derek Lambeth	(Sacramento State University)
G/F	6'5	Derrick Lemuel	(Mesa State)
G	6'2	Jermaine Mason	(Colorado State University - Pueblo)
G	6'0	Adam Moeller	(Fort Lewis College)
F	6'7	Joshua Morse	(Metropolitan State College)
F	6'8	Michael Morse	(Metropolitan State College)
G/F	6'6	Dameon Page	(University of Colorado)
F	6'6	Tony Qorri	(Mesa State)
G	6'4	Johnny Reece	(University of Oregon)
G	6'3	Leslie Richardson	(University of Denver)
G	6'3	Dorian Smith	(Metropolitan State College)
F	6'6	D.J. Stelly	(University of Dayton)
F	6'7	Bruce Thomas	(Regis University)
F	6'7	Jermaine Williams	(Louisiana State University)
G	6'2	Solomon Yearby	(Campbell University)
G	6'3	Jason Lampa	(Northwood University)

== Coaches ==
Dejon Jernagin, 2006 (10-7)
A.B. Maxey, 2006 (3-0)

== All-Stars ==
2006

- Sneed Deaderick, G
- Phillip Hillstock, F
- D.J. Stelly, F

== Team record ==
Season	W	L	Win %	Result
2006	13	7	.650	3rd Place, Western Conference

== Franchise history ==
The Cavalry was created as an expansion team of the International Basketball League in September 2005. Initially named the Aurora Outlaws, the franchise became the Aurora Cavalry and from its inception became an above-average team in the league. The Cavalry tipped off their first game on March 31, 2006, beating crosstown team Colorado Crossover 140-132. Beginning their existence with a 5-game winning streak, Aurora, led by coach and former Harlem Globetrotter Dejon Jernagin (later replaced by A.B. Maxey), quickly gained a reputation for a balanced attack which was hard for their opponents to counter at first, but they went on to lose seven of their final fifteen games - four in a row in blowout fashion. Injuries to some players reportedly was to blame, while others left for better opportunities elsewhere. However, the Cavalry managed to finish 2006 in 4th place out of 12 teams in the Western Conference and 7th overall.

The Cavalry have since folded.
