= Colorado Crossover =

- Founded: 2005
- League: IBL 2005-2007
- Team history: Colorado Crossover; 2005-2007
- Based in: Lakewood, Colorado
- Arena: CCU Events Center
- Colors: Powder Blue, White
- Owner: Crossover Ministries
- Head coach: Eric Stoffel
- Championships: None
- Dancers: Crossover Dance Team
- Mascot: Spradley

The Colorado Crossover were a professional basketball team in the International Basketball League. Based in Lakewood, Colorado, the Crossover began play in 2006, and lasted 2 seasons, compiling an overall 18–21 record. The Crossover were owned by Crossover Ministries and played their home games at Colorado Christian University.

== Season by season ==
Regular Season
Year	Wins	Losses	Percentage	Division
2006	6	14	.300	11th - West Division
2007	11	7	.611	3rd - Midwest Division

== All-Stars ==
=== 2006 ===
- Jed Cranor
- John Johnson
- Nick Mohr

=== 2007 ===
- Phillip Hillstock
- Darius Pope

== Franchise history ==
The Crossover began their history in 2005 as a team owned by the International Basketball League (2005-). After months of looking for an owner, the league announced that they would assume ownership of the unnamed Colorado team for the 2006 season. However, ownership did indeed step forward. Crossover Ministries, an organization that travels internationally to teach basketball and minister to young people all over the world, took the reins of the franchise less than two months before the season was to begin. Since then, they became Colorado's longest enduring minor league basketball franchise before ceasing operations in 2007.

=== 1st season ===
The Crossover began play on March 31, 2006, losing a hard-fought game at their in-state rivals, the Aurora Cavalry, 140–132, the first of many spirited battles between the teams. They won their first game April 6, 2006, against the Cedar Valley Jaguars, the Crossover's first home game. Nick Mohr soon drew attention as the star scorer of the Crossover team in their first season, and led the team to an historic come-from-behind 162–161 overtime victory over Aurora at Colorado Christian University on April 28, 2006, the second-highest scoring pro basketball game in Colorado history, scoring the second-most points of any pro basketball team in a game in Colorado. On May 11, 2006, at Chatfield High School Eric Dow had a coming out party as the team's second high powered star when he scored a monster double-double of 45 points and 20 rebounds, both Colorado minor league basketball records, against the Tri City Ballers who eventually won the Western Conference. He later broke his own record on June 25, 2006, against the Eugene Chargers at Colorado Christian University, scoring 53 points, the second-highest single game points total of a Colorado pro basketball player only to David Thompson of the Denver Nuggets, and the second-highest in IBL history. The Colorado Crossover finished their inaugural season next to last place in the Western Conference, but earned a reputation for playing teams tough throughout their games and occasionally knocking off top contenders in the league.

=== 2nd season ===
Colorado made a number of adjustments in its first offseason, starting with new coach Eric Stoffel (previously of the Colorado Storm), a full-time venue at the Colorado Christian University Events Center, and new players including three from Phillip Hillstock, Jermaine Mason and Michael Morse from the now disbanded rival Aurora Cavalry. The Crossover began play on March 30, 2007. What resulted was a dramatic improvement on their inaugural season, led by scoring leaders Phillip Hillstock and Darius Pope. It started with a 170–146 victory over the Lewis County Raptors at home, scoring the second-highest single game total in Colorado pro basketball history and highest ever in regulation, with 92 points in the first half alone. The end stretch of the season featured an impressive 8-game winning streak including three series sweeps in a row, splitting or winning series at Phoenix and Hub City and at home against Las Vegas, Arizona and Phoenix. Despite their remarkable improvement and 3rd-place finish in the Midwest Division, the Crossover did not participate in the playoffs.

== Players ==
- Ted Allen, C, 6'10, University of Colorado at Boulder (2007)
- Otis Anderson, F, 6'6, West Virginia University Institute of Technology (2006)
- Demarcus Andures (2006)
- Nonzo Azubuike, G, 6'0, John Brown University (2006)
- Jeff Boozer, G, 6'1, Laramie County Community College (2007)
- Eric Dow, F/C, 6'8, University of Denver (2006)
- T.J. Doyle, G, 6'0, Colorado Christian University (2006)
- Ian Hardaway, G, 5'11 (2006)
- Phillip Hillstock, F, 6'7, Barber-Scotia College (2007)
- John Johnson, G, 6'3, Trinity Christian College (2006)
- Justin Kaliszewski, G, 5'11, University of Northern Colorado (2006)
- Jermaine Mason, G, 6'0, Colorado State University - Pueblo (2007)
- Jeremiah Mayes, F/C, 6'8, California Polytechnic State University (2006)
- Antoine McGee, G, 5'9, University of Colorado at Boulder (2007)
- Nicholas (Nick) Mohr, G/F, 6'5, University of Colorado at Boulder (2006–07)
- Maurice Moore, G, 6'0, San Jose State University (2007)
- Michael Morse, F/C, 6'7, Metropolitan State College of Denver (2007)
- Dameon Page, G/F, 6'5, Azusa Pacific University (2006–07)
- Darius Pope, G, 6'4, Colorado State University - Pueblo (2006–07)
- Mike Puccio, G, 6'0, Colorado State University - Pueblo (2006–07)
- Ronald Rhea (Jr.), F, 6'6, California State University Stanislaus (2007)
- Larry Richardson (2006)
- Kevin Shorter, F, 6'7, Ashland University (2007)
- Adam Stacker (2006)
- Paul Terry, F/C, 6'7 (2006)
- Bruce Thomas, F (2006)
- John Thorpe, C, 6'8, Regis University (2007)
- Lorenzo Trudo, F/C, 6'7, Concordia University (2006)
- Rob White, F, 6'8, Southern Nazarene University (2007)
- Jermaine Williams, F, 6'7 (2006)
- Matt Williams, F/C, 6'8, Colorado State University (2006)
- Curi Yutzy, G, 6'0, Colorado Christian University (2006)

== Coaches ==
- Dave Chapman (2006)
- Eric Stoffel (2007)
- John Hodges (Assistant - 2007)
