= Hawkeye Point =

Highest natural point in Iowa, U.S.

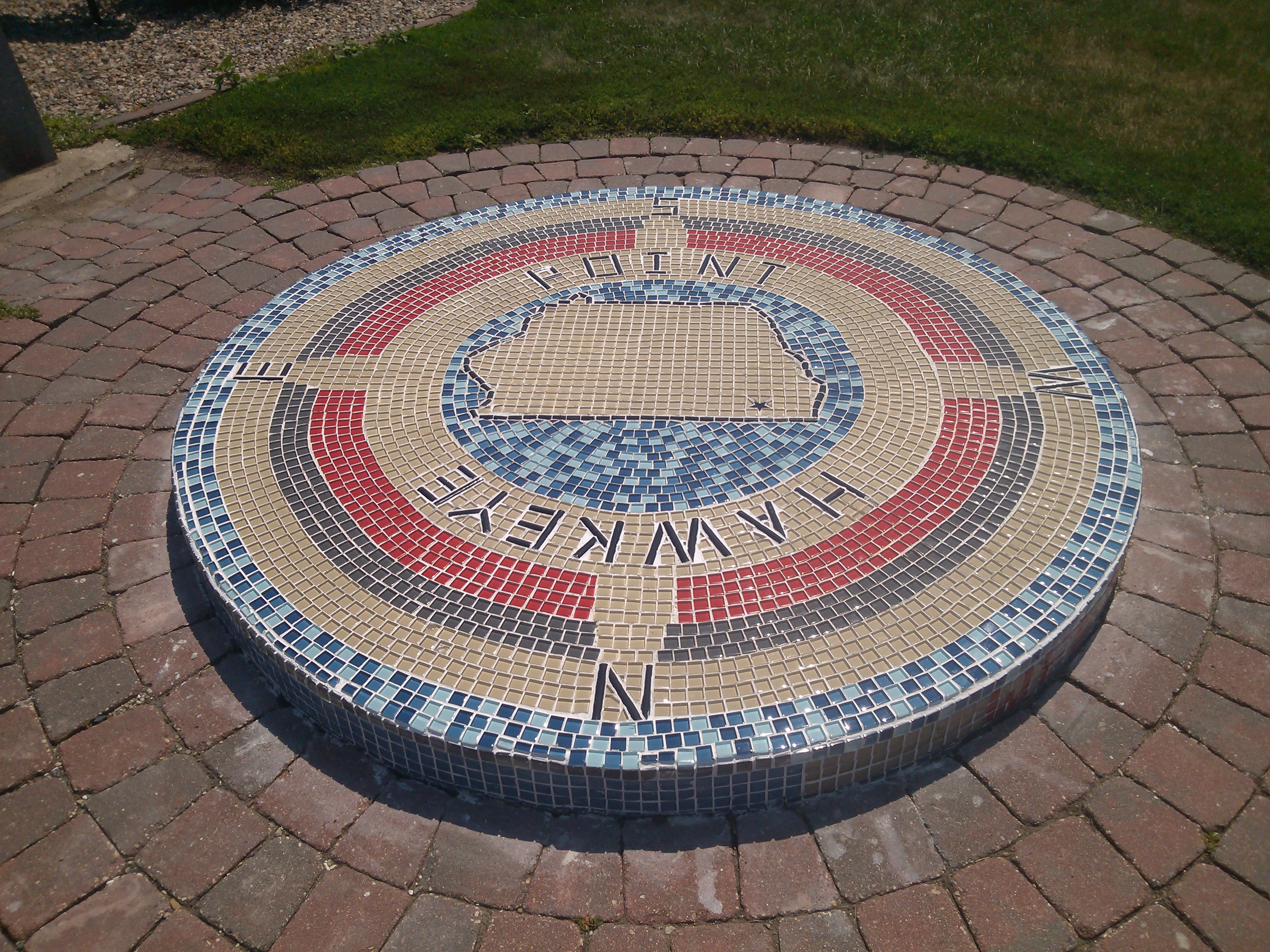
- Mosaic marking the highest natural point in the state of Iowa.

Highest point
- Elevation: 1,670 ft (510 m)
- Prominence: 40 ft (12 m)
- Listing: U.S. state high point 42nd
- Coordinates: 43°27′36″N 95°42′32″W

Geography
- Location within Iowa
- Location: Osceola County, Iowa, US
- Topo map: USGS Sibley East

Climbing
- Easiest route: Walk

Hawkeye Point is the highest natural point in Iowa at 1,670 feet (510 m). It is approximately 4.5 miles (7.2 km) north of Sibley on the eastern side of SR 60 and approximately 3.5 miles (5.6 km) south of the Iowa-Minnesota state border. The high ground lies 100 feet (30 m) due south of an old silo.

The land that includes the highpoint was donated by the Sterler family, who worked this land for many decades, to Osceola County with the stipulation that the land be turned into a park. Osceola County, through its Economic Development Commission and Hawkeye Point Committee, has removed a few structures that were deemed to be hazardous to public safety including the old hog feed bunker at the highpoint site and a few small barns. They have erected an informational kiosk which highlights the family and the county and features a display of license plates from the 50 states sent in over the years to the Sterlers.

The county purchased approximately 6 acres (2.4 ha) of surrounding land including the old family farm house, which is being used as office space for the county. There are a flagpole, picnic bench, tile mosaic, several granite markers, and five tall posts with signs pointing to the other 49 state highpoints, each with the correct distance noted. The local 4-H group and high school youths contributed a great deal to this effort. The Hawkeye Point Commission also recently purchased a wooded plot of land of about 7 acres (28,000 m^{2}) on the north side of the county road abutting the property with the intent to turn it into a campground.

The Highpointers Foundation, a non-profit charity set up to benefit privately owned state highpoints, has provided much of the funding for the renovations at Hawkeye Point.

== See also ==
- Outline of Iowa
- Index of Iowa-related articles
- List of U.S. states by elevation
