= Climate change in Iowa =

Climate change in the US state of Iowa

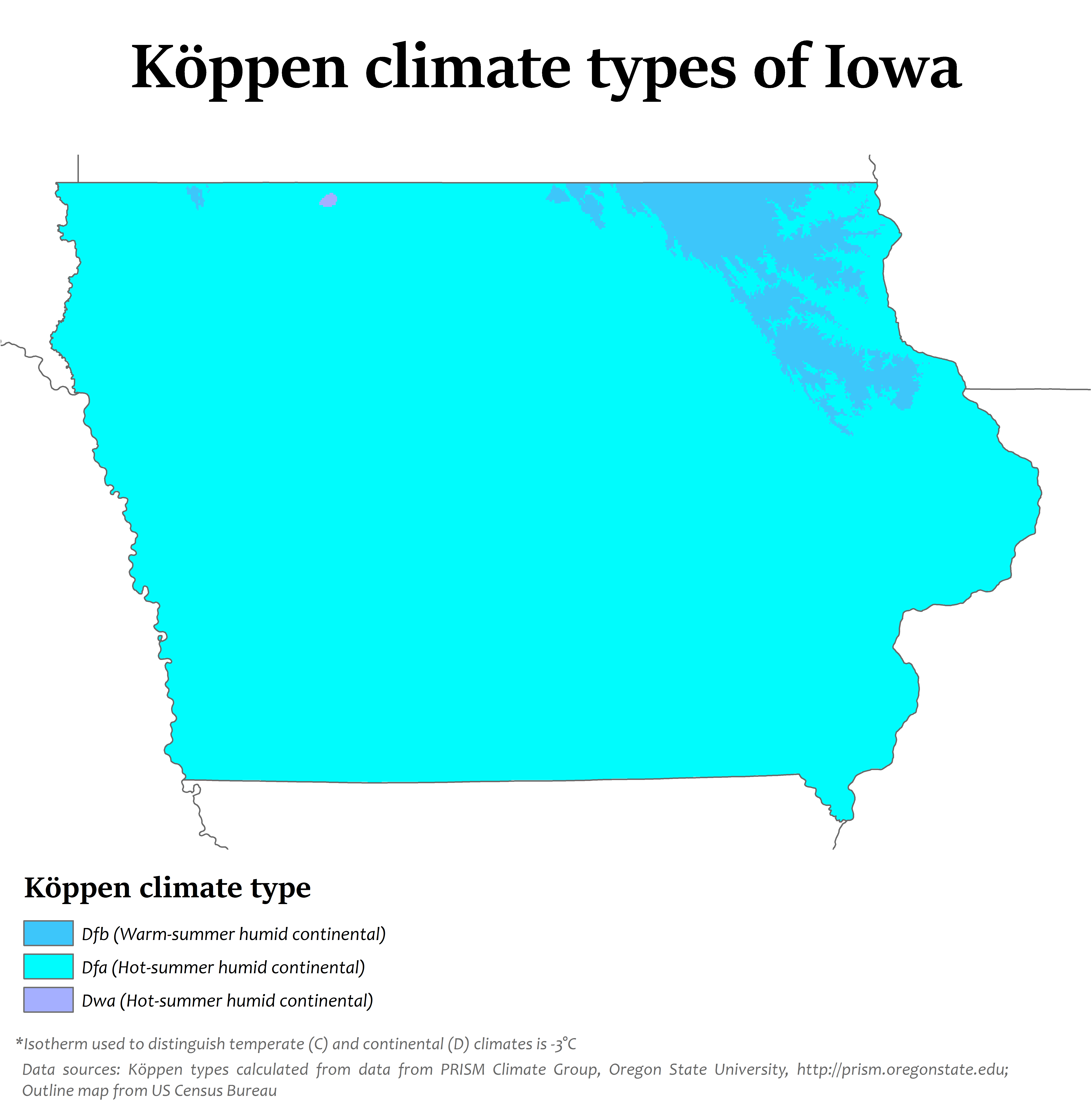
Köppen climate types in Iowa, showing that most of the state is now hot-summer humid continental.

Climate change in Iowa encompasses the effects of climate change, attributed to man-made increases in atmospheric carbon dioxide, in the U.S. state of Iowa.

According to the Fifth National Climate Assessment, a report published in 2023 by the U.S. Global Change Research program — an initiative of the U.S. federal government — the climate of the Midwest has warmed since the first half of the 20th century, and annual precipitation has increased. Rapid swings between extreme wet and dry periods have also occurred and are expected to become more frequent. Impacts to farming, water quantity and quality, natural resources, health and well-being, and more, are expected for Iowa and other Midwestern states.

According to the United States Environmental Protection Agency (EPA) "Iowa's climate is changing. Most of the state has warmed one-half to one degree (F) in the last century, and floods are becoming more frequent. In the coming decades, the state will have more extremely hot days, which may harm public health in urban areas and corn harvests in rural areas".

== Severe weather ==
=== Heavy precipitation and flooding ===
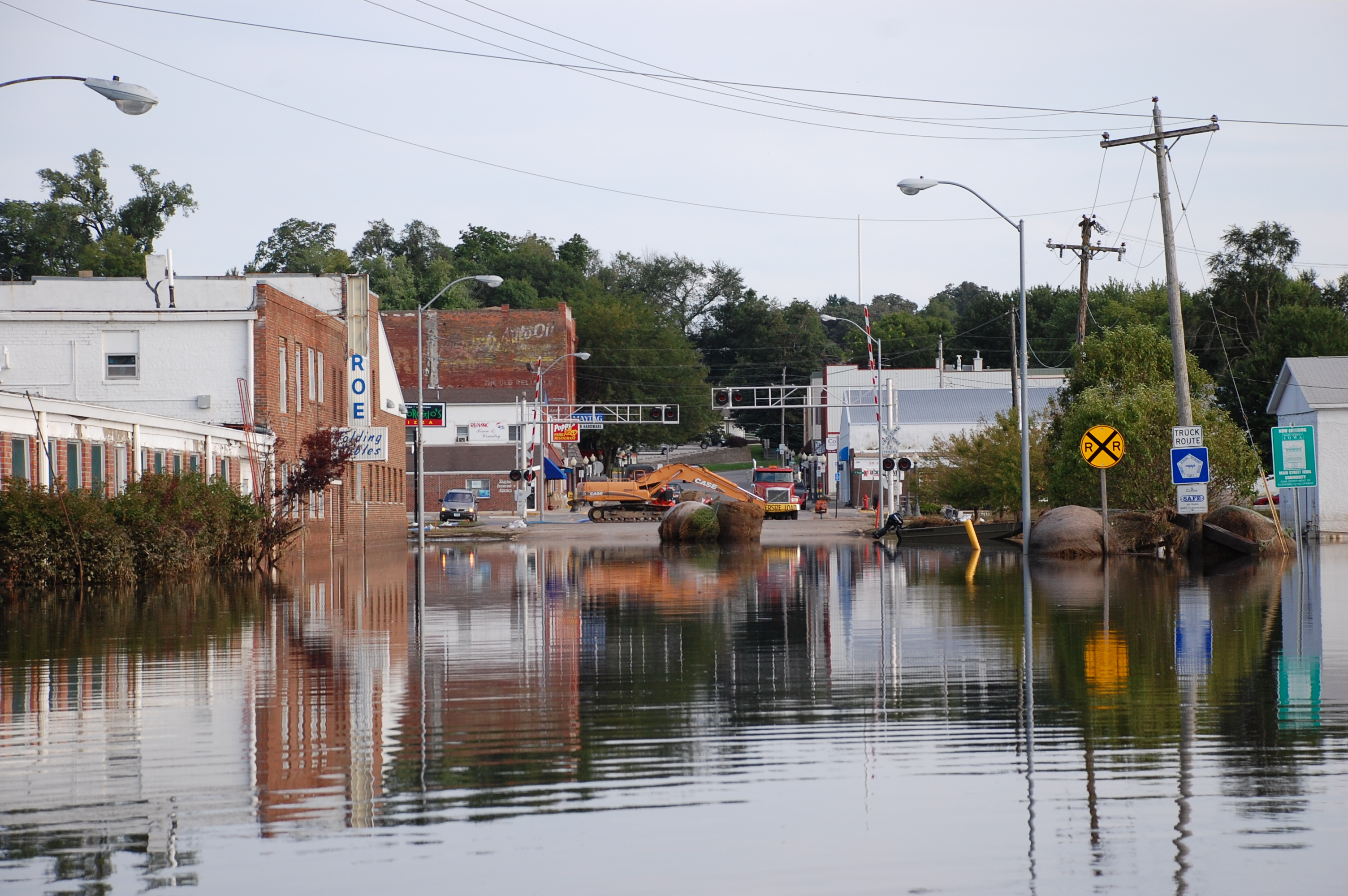
Flooded road, Colfax, 2010

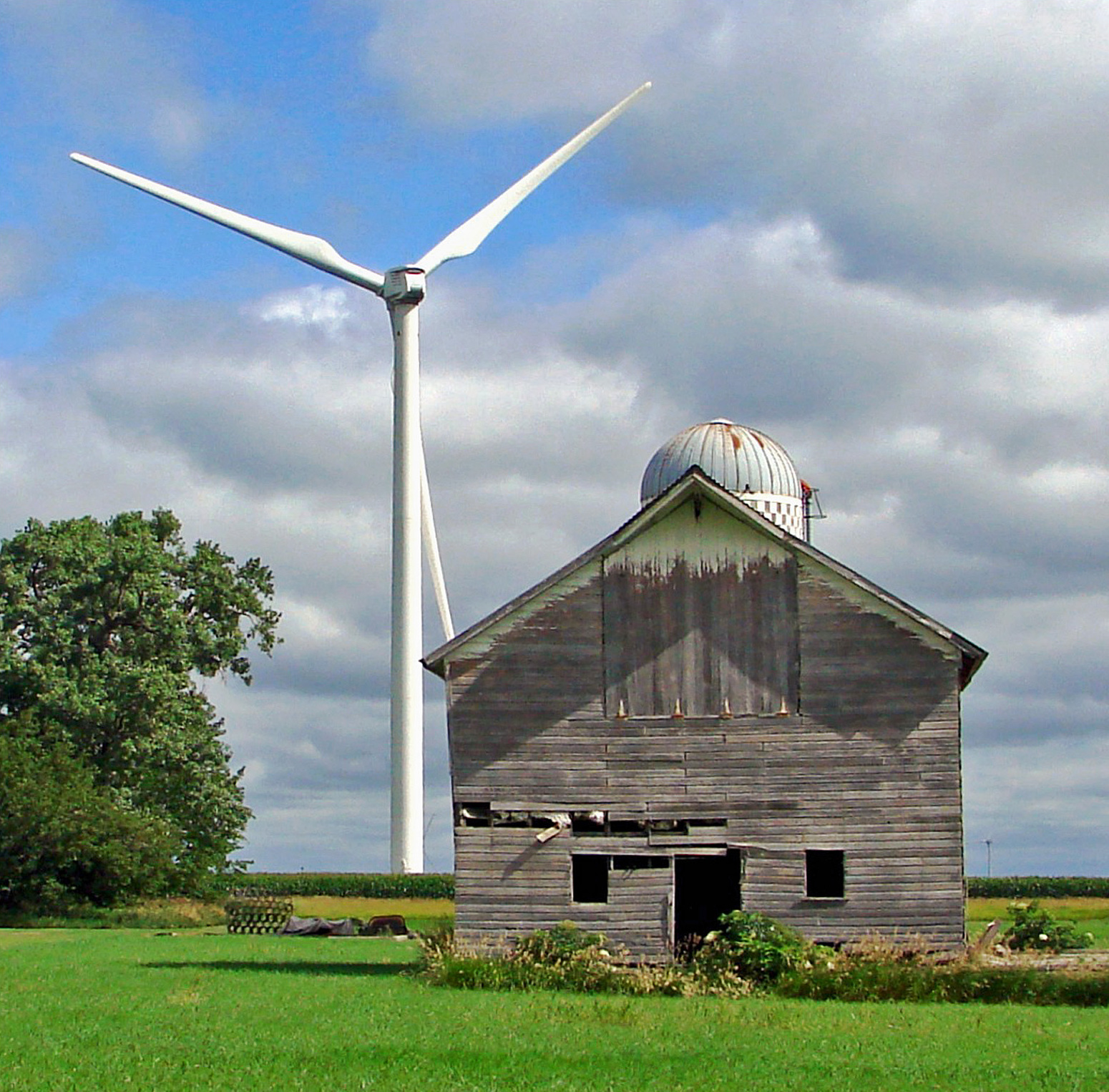
Wind turbine

According to the EPA "Changing the climate is likely to increase the frequency of floods in Iowa. Over the last half century, average annual precipitation in most of the Midwest has increased by 5 to 10 percent. But rainfall during the four wettest days of the year has increased about 35 percent, and the amount of water flowing in most streams during the worst flood of the year has increased by more than 20 percent. During the next century, spring rainfall and average precipitation are likely to increase, and severe rainstorms are likely to intensify. Each of these factors will tend to further increase the risk of flooding".

=== Tornadoes ===
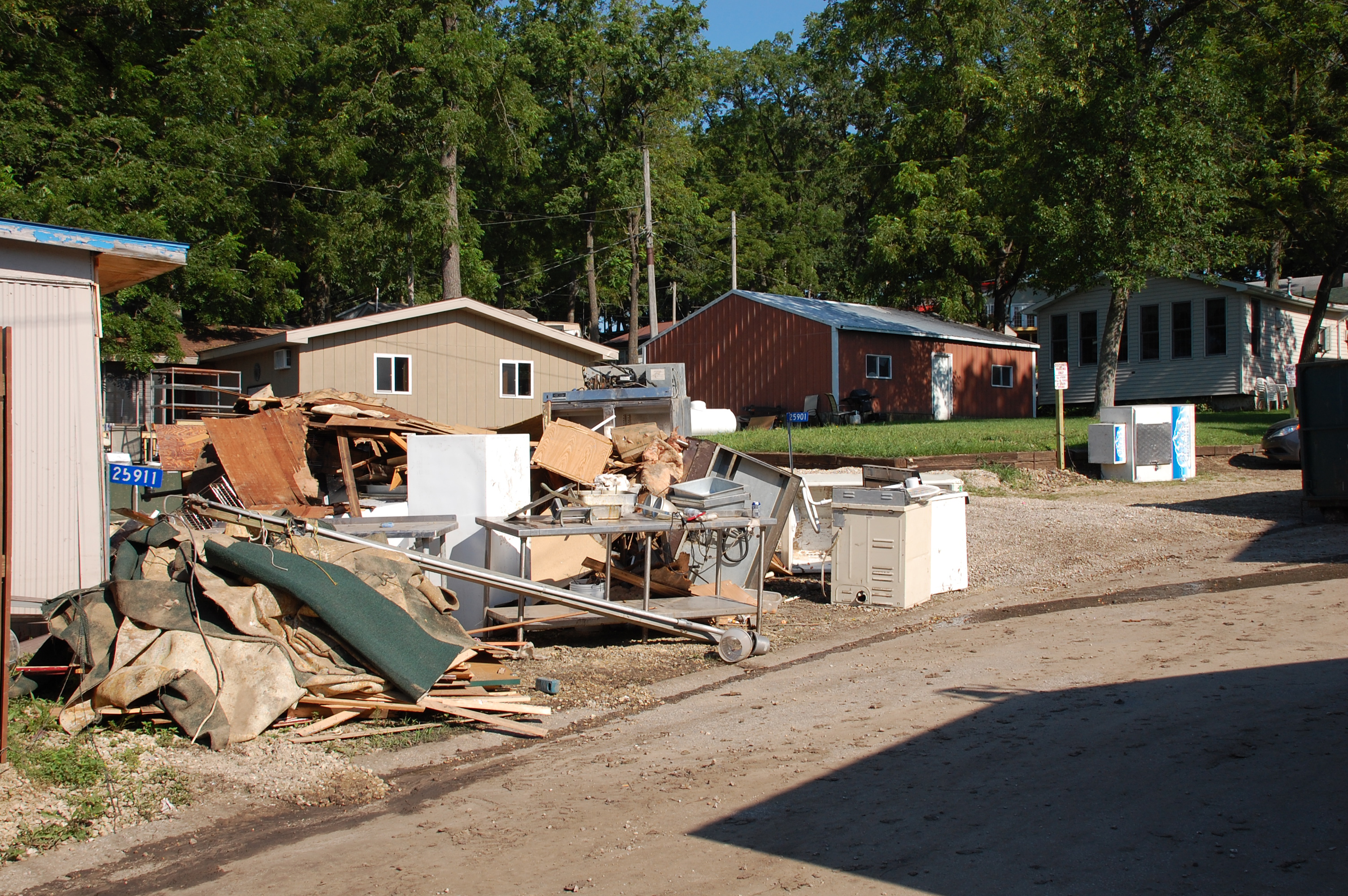
Flood damage, Lake Delhi, 2010

According to the EPA "Scientists do not know how the frequency and severity of tornadoes will change. Rising concentrations of greenhouse gases tend to increase humidity, and thus, atmospheric instability, which would encourage tornadoes. But wind shear is likely to decrease, which would discourage tornadoes. Research is ongoing to learn whether tornadoes will be more or less frequent in the future. Because Iowa experiences about 50 tornadoes a year, such research is closely followed by meteorologists in the state".

== Mississippi and Missouri Rivers ==
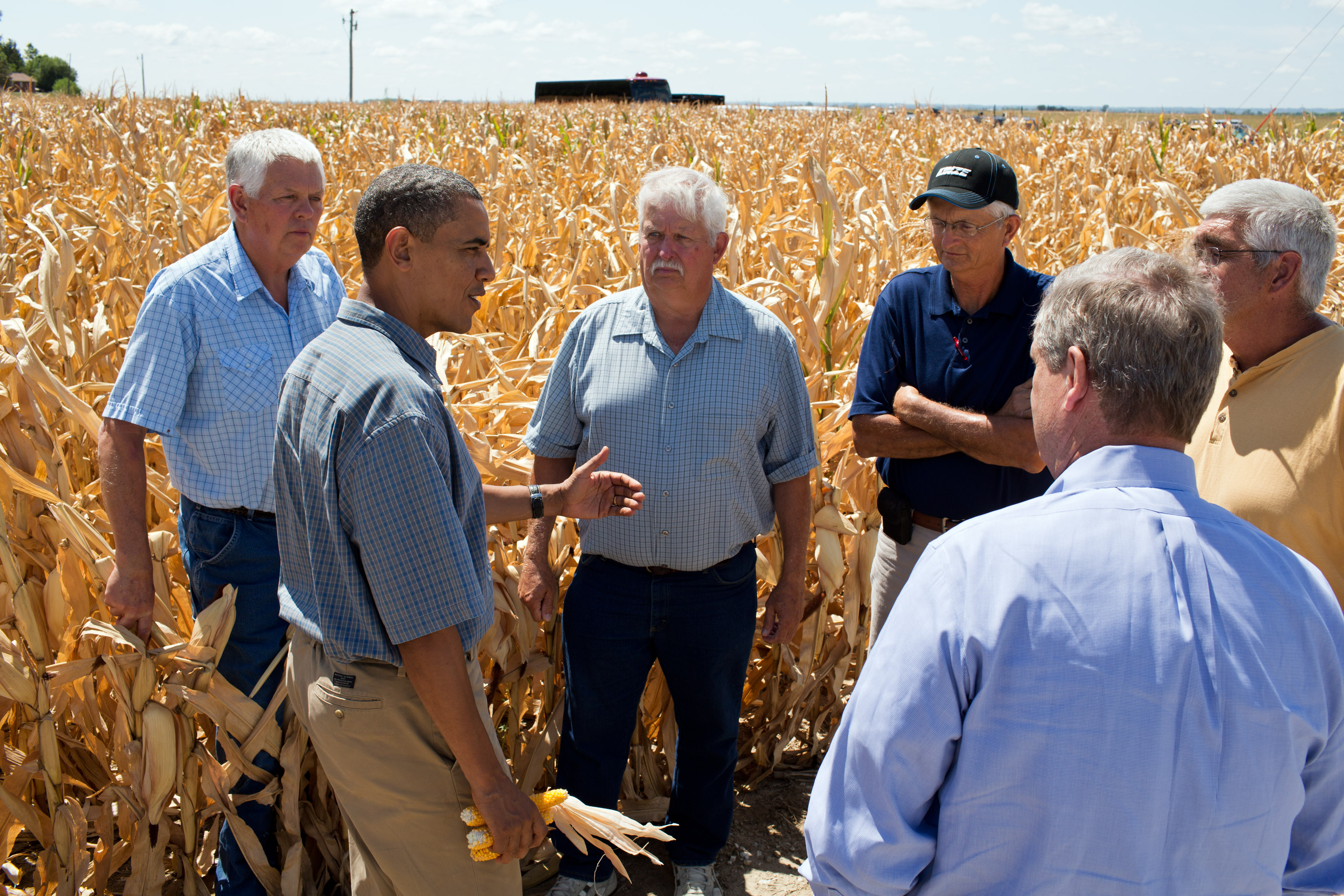
President Barack Obama and Secretary of Agriculture Tom Vilsack hear from farmers about drought, August 2012

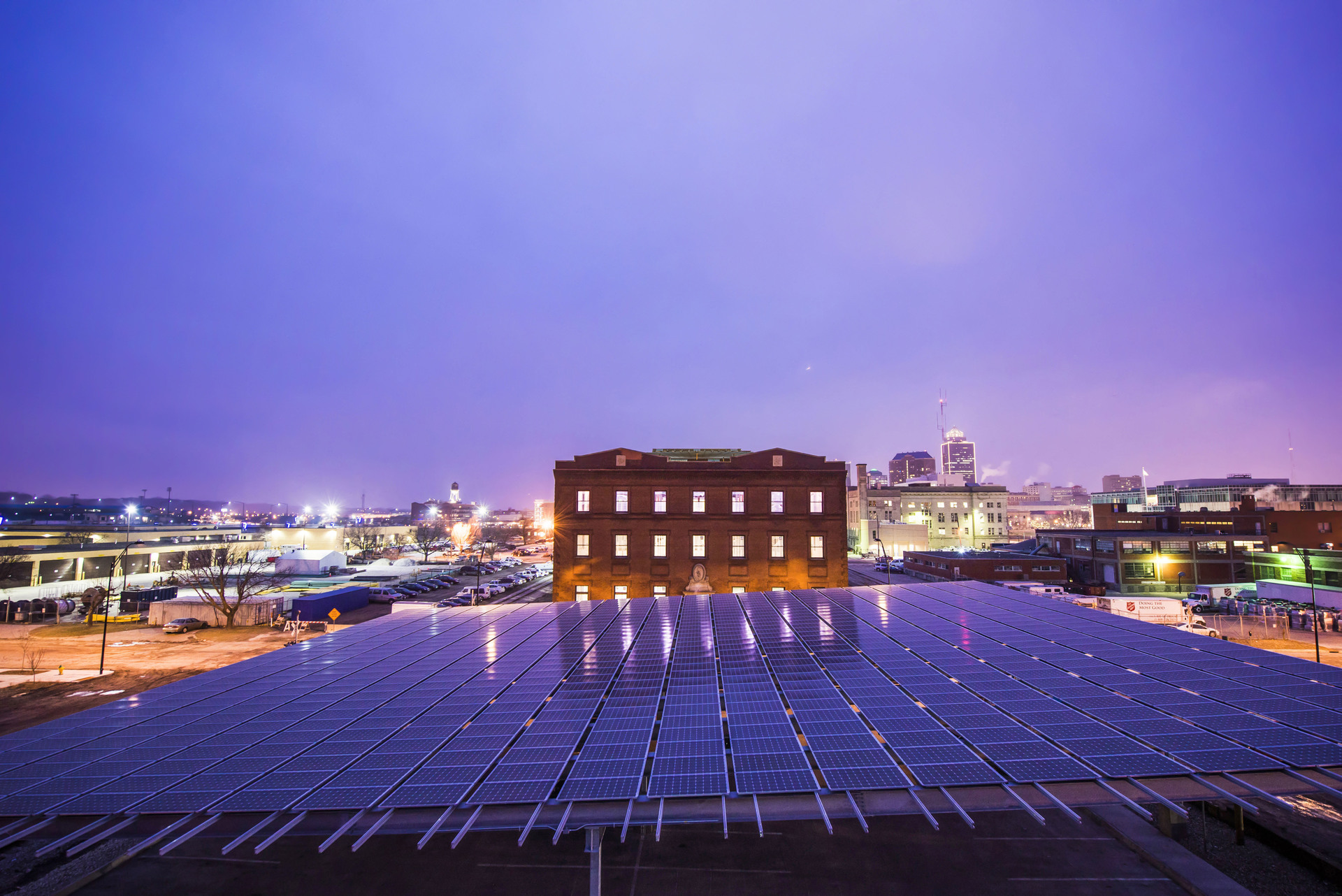
Solar installation, Des Moines

According to the EPA "Flooding occasionally threatens both navigation and riverfront communities, and greater river flows could increase these threats. In April and May 2011, a combination of heavy rainfall and melting snow caused a flood that closed the Mississippi River to navigation and caused billions of dollars in damage downstream. Later that spring, heavy rains and rapid snowmelt upstream led to flooding along the Missouri River, which damaged property and closed the river to navigation. These floods caused $85 million in direct damages along the Missouri, with the most extensive property damage and crop loss occurring between Sioux City and Council Bluffs".

According to the EPA "Although springtime in Iowa is likely to be wetter, summer droughts are likely to be more severe. Higher evaporation and lower summer rainfall are likely to reduce river flows. The drought of 2012 narrowed navigation channels, forced lock closures, and caused dozens of barges to run aground on the Mississippi River, which cost the region more than $275 million".

== Agriculture ==
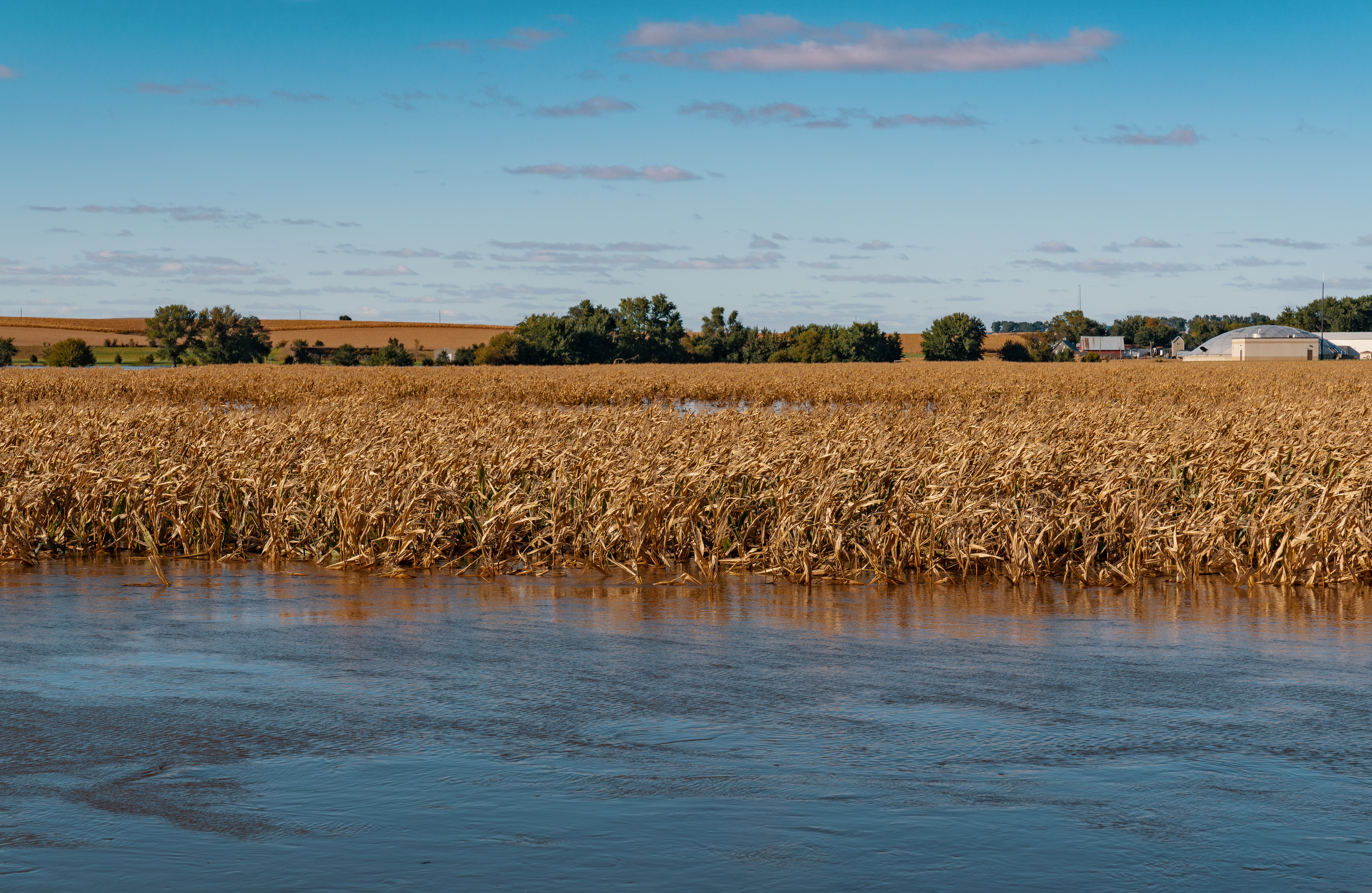
Flooded fields, Le Mars

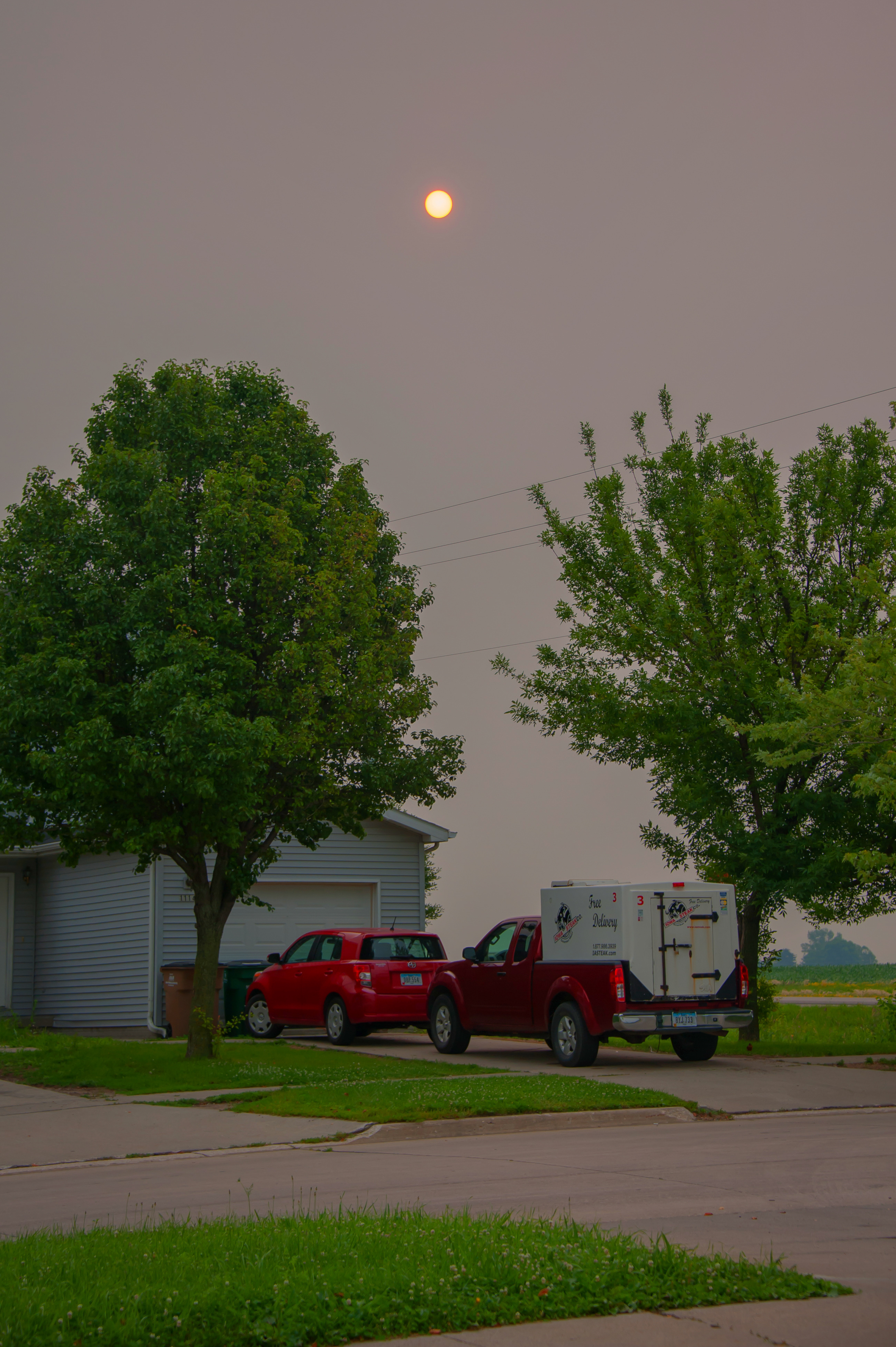
Air pollution from Canadian wildfires, 2015

According to the EPA "Changing the climate will have favorable and harmful effects on farming, although the net effect is unknown. Longer frost-free growing seasons and higher concentrations of atmospheric carbon dioxide would increase yields for many crops during an average year. But increasingly hot summers are likely to reduce yields of corn and possibly soybeans. Higher temperatures are also likely to reduce livestock productivity, because heat stress disrupts the animals' metabolism. Seventy years from now, Iowa is likely to have 10 to 20 more days per year with temperatures above 95°F than it has today. More severe droughts or floods would also hurt crop yields". The Des Moines Register also reported that "[i]ntense heat waves could prevent corn and soybeans from pollinating", and that "[h]eavy spring rains — likely followed by summer droughts — will tighten an already shortened planting window".

== See also ==
- List of U.S. states and territories by carbon dioxide emissions
- Plug-in electric vehicles in Iowa
