= Sports teams from Iowa =

Comprehensive list of sports teams based in Iowa

The state of Iowa does not have any major league sports teams, however, it does have many minor league teams based throughout the state.

== Baseball ==
| Team | League | City | Years |
|---|---|---|---|
| Burlington Bees | Midwest League | Burlington, Iowa | 1962–present |
| Cedar Rapids Kernels | Midwest League (1962–present) | Cedar Rapids, Iowa | 1962–present |
| Clinton LumberKings | Midwest League | Clinton, Iowa | 1959–present |
| Dubuque Packers | Mississippi–Ohio Valley League (1954–1955); ML (1956–1967 and 1974–1976) | Dubuque, Iowa | 1956–1976 |
| Des Moines Bruins | Western League (1947–1958) | Des Moines, Iowa | 1947–1958 |
| Iowa City Gold Sox | Semi-Professional | Iowa City, Iowa | 1912–1913 |
| Iowa Cubs | American Association (1969–1997); Pacific Coast League (1998–present) | Des Moines, Iowa | 1969–present |
| Keokuk Westerns | National Association | Keokuk, Iowa | 1875 |
| Sioux City Explorers | American Association | Sioux City, Iowa | 1993–present |
| Quad City River Bandits | Midwest League | Davenport, Iowa | 1901–present |
| Waterloo Indians/Diamonds | Midwest League (1977–1993) | Waterloo, Iowa | 1977–1993 |

== Basketball ==
- Cedar Rapids Silver Bullets
- Cedar Valley Jaguars - IBL 2005–2006
- Des Moines Dragons - IBA 1997–2001
- Des Moines Heat - IBL 2005–2006
- Frontier City River Dogz - MBA
- Iowa Cornets - WBL 1978–1980
- Iowa Wolves - NBA G League 2007–present
- Tri-Cities Blackhawks - NBL, NBA 1946–1951 (now the Atlanta Hawks)
- Waterloo Kings - IBL 2005–2006
- Waterloo Hawks - NBL 1948-1949, NBA 1949-50, NPBL 1950-51

== College ==
- Drake Bulldogs
- Iowa State Cyclones
- Northern Iowa Panthers
- Northwestern Red Raiders
- Iowa Hawkeyes
- Central Dutch
- Simpson Storm
- Loras Duhawks
- Dubuque Spartans
- Coe Kohawks
- Dordt Defenders
- Buena Vista Beavers
- Grand View Vikings

== Hockey ==
- Cedar Rapids RoughRiders, United States Hockey League 1999–present
- Des Moines Capitols, International Hockey League 1972–1975
- Des Moines Buccaneers, United States Hockey League 1980–present
- Des Moines Ice Hawks, United States Central Hockey League 1958–1961
- Des Moines Oak Leafs, United States Hockey League 1961–1963, International Hockey League 1963–1972
- Dubuque Fighting Saints, United States Hockey League 1980–2001
- Dubuque Fighting Saints, United States Hockey League 2010–present
- Dubuque Thunderbirds, Minnesota Junior Hockey League 2001–2006, Central States Hockey League 2006–2010
- Iowa Heartlanders, ECHL 2021-present
- Iowa Stars/Chops, American Hockey League 2005–2009
- Iowa Stars, Central Hockey League 1969–70
- Iowa Wild, American Hockey League 2013–present
- North Iowa Huskies, United States Hockey League 1983–1999
- North Iowa Outlaws, North American Hockey League 2005–2010
- River City Lancers, United States Hockey League 2002–2004
- Sioux City Musketeers, United States Hockey League 1972–present
- Sioux City Sunhawks, American Amateur Hockey League 1951–52
- Waterloo Black Hawks, United States Hockey League 1962–present

== Soccer ==
| Team | League | City | Years |
|---|---|---|---|
| Des Moines Menace | USL League Two | Des Moines, Iowa | 1994–present |
| Cedar Rapids Rampage | Major Arena Soccer League | Cedar Rapids, Iowa | 2015–2018 |
| Cedar Rapids Rampage United | Premier League of America | Cedar Rapids, Iowa | 2016–2017 |
| Cedar Rapids Inferno | Midwest Premier League | Cedar Rapids, Iowa | 2019–present |
| Sioux City Breeze | USL League Two | Sioux City, Iowa | 1994–1999 |
| Union Dubuque F.C. | Midwest Premier League | Dubuque, Iowa | 2018–present |
| Siouxland United FC | United Premiere Soccer League | Sioux City, Iowa | 2023-present |

== Volleyball ==
- Iowa Blizzard NVA

== Mixed Martial Arts ==
- Quad City Silverbacks IFL (International Fight League)

== Professional Wrestling ==
- Iowa Stalkers (Real Pro Wrestling), 2005-2006
