= USS Iowa =

USS Iowa may refer to several vessels:

== U.S. military vessels ==
=== Vessels named USS Iowa ===
- USS Iowa (BB-4), a battleship that saw action during the Spanish–American War
- USS Iowa (BB-53), a battleship already under construction when she was canceled by the Washington Naval Treaty
- USS Iowa (BB-61), the lead ship of the Iowa-class battleship that saw action during World War II, the Korean War, and the Gulf War
- USS Iowa (SSN-797), a Virginia-class submarine commissioned on 5 April 2025.

=== Other vessels ===
- Iowa (steamboat), 1838, a Mississippi River boat that transported troops during the American Civil War
- USS Ammonoosuc (1864), a monitor that was never commissioned and was renamed Iowa before being sold
- USS Iowan (ID-3002), 1914 cargo ship used by the U.S. Navy in World War I for cargo and troop transport.

== Non-military vessels named Iowa ==
- Maid of Iowa, 1842 steamboat
- A stern-wheel rafter/packet named Iowa plied the Mississippi River from 1865–1900.
- A stern-wheel towboat named Iowa operated in the Mississippi River from 1921–1954; a contemporaneous dredge named Iowa also existed from 1932–1956.
- An ocean-going steamer named Iowa was in use in the late 19th century.
- In 1898 an excursion steamboat named Iowa was launched in Independence, Iowa, after several years as a popular attraction, it was carried over the Independence dam by high water and was demolished.
