= Iowa (steamboat) =

1838 Mississippi River steamboat

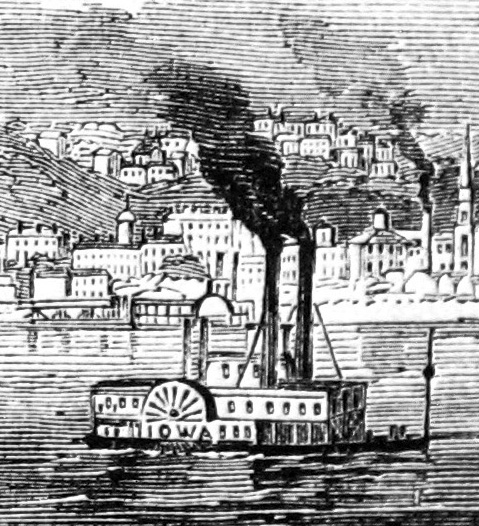
Steamboat Iowa chuffing up the Mississippi through Dubuque, Iowa, ca. 1865.

Seal of Iowa, showing the Steamboat Iowa on the right.

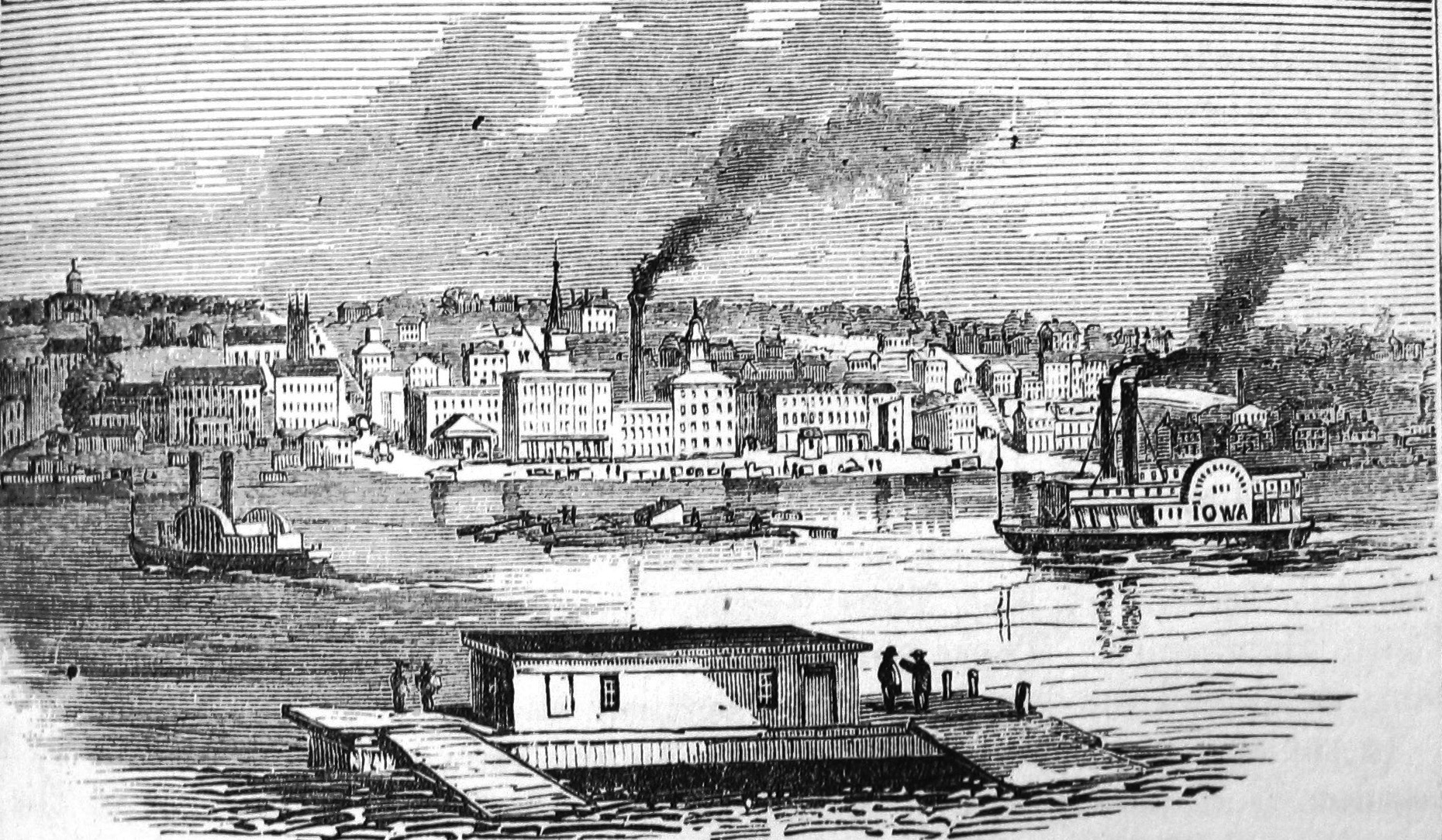
Picture of Davenport, Iowa, 1865; on the right is the Iowa.

The Steamboat Iowa was revered as one of the largest and fastest boats on the Mississippi in the mid 19th century; it is incorporated into the official Seal of Iowa. Built in 1838, the Iowa was the first vessel named for the newly formed Territory of Iowa. It weighed 112 tons, could pull 10 keelboats, and it set the speed record from Galena, Illinois to St. Louis in 1843, making the trip in 44 hours, a record that held until 1849. The Iowa sank after a collision with the steamboat Declaration on Oct. 1, 1847 while traveling from New Orleans to St. Louis. This liability for this collision was ultimately decided by the U.S. Supreme Court case John Walsh v. Patrick Rogers (54 U.S. 283–1852). However, the Iowa was apparently rebuilt, or a new steamboat was later rechristened Iowa, since similar side-wheeler appeared twice in Barber and Howe's 1865 Loyal West in the Time of Rebellion, and there is reference to the Iowa being used as a troop transport during the Civil War.

== Later ships and boats named Iowa ==
Several U.S. Navy ships were named USS Iowa, beginning in 1864.

A stern-wheel rafter/packet named Iowa plied the Mississippi 1865–1900.

A stern-wheel towboat named Iowa operated in the Mississippi 1921–1954; a contemporaneous dredge named Iowa also existed 1932–1956.

An ocean-going steamer named Iowa was in use in the late 19th century.

In 1898 an excursion steamboat named Iowa was launched in Independence, Iowa, after several years as a popular attraction, it was carried over the Independence dam by high water and was demolished.
