= Solomon Yearby =

American model and basketball player (born 1981)

Solomon Uriah Yearby (born April 7, 1981 in Birmingham, Alabama) is an American model and basketball player.

Yearby began modeling after hearing a radio advertisement for a Christian modeling agency. He is also a professional American basketball player, playing in the International Basketball League (IBL) for the Eugene Chargers, and in the American Basketball Association (ABA). He has played in the Euroleague, representing countries such as Germany, Italy, Spain, and Sweden, and played college basketball at Campbell University.
