= Courts of Iowa =

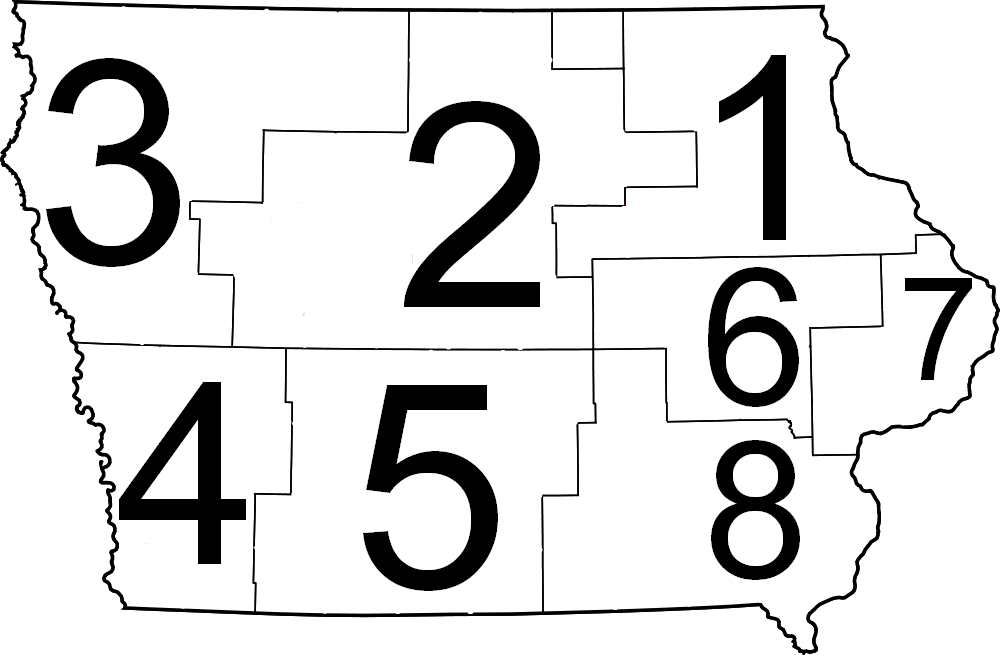
Map of judicial districts

Courts of Iowa include:

State courts of Iowa

- Iowa Supreme Court
  - Iowa Court of Appeals
    - Iowa District Courts (8 districts)

Federal courts located in Iowa

- United States District Court for the Northern District of Iowa
- United States District Court for the Southern District of Iowa

Former federal courts of Iowa

- United States District Court for the District of Iowa (extinct, subdivided)

== See also ==
- Judiciary of Iowa
