= Seal of Iowa =

Official government emblem of the U.S. state of Iowa

Great Seal of the State of Iowa

Versions
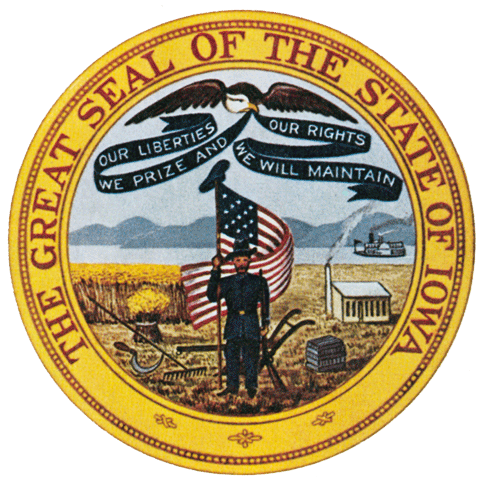
- Variation

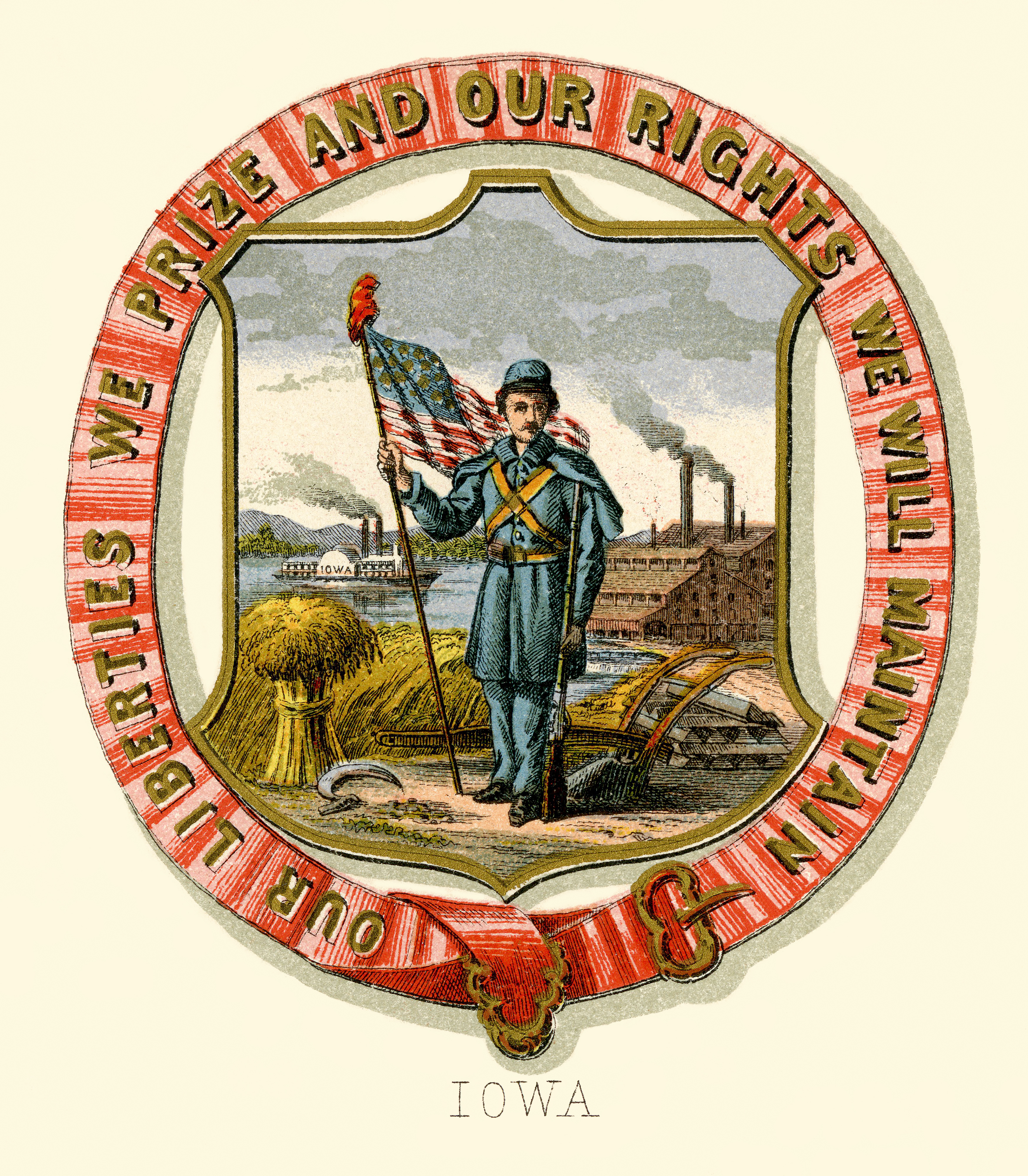
- Historical coat of arms (1876)
- Armiger: State of Iowa
- Adopted: February 25, 1847
- Motto: Our liberties we prize and our rights we will maintain

The Great Seal of the State of Iowa was created in 1847 (one year after Iowa became a U.S. state) and depicts a citizen soldier standing in a wheat field surrounded by symbols including farming, mining, and transportation with the Mississippi River in the background. An eagle overhead bears the state motto.

== Definition ==
The Seal of Iowa is described carefully under Iowa Code 1A.1 in the following: "The secretary of state be, and is, hereby authorized to procure a seal which shall be the great seal of the state of Iowa, two inches in diameter, upon which shall be engraved the following device, surrounded by the words, 'The Great Seal of the State of Iowa' - a sheaf and field of standing wheat, with a sickle and other farming utensils, on the left side near the bottom; a lead furnace and pile of pig lead on the right side; the citizen soldier, with a plow in his rear, supporting the American flag and liberty cap with his right hand, and his gun with his left, in the center and near the bottom; the Mississippi River in the rear of the whole, with the steamer Iowa under way; an eagle near the upper edge, holding in his beak a scroll, with the following inscription upon it: Our liberties we prize, and our rights we will maintain."

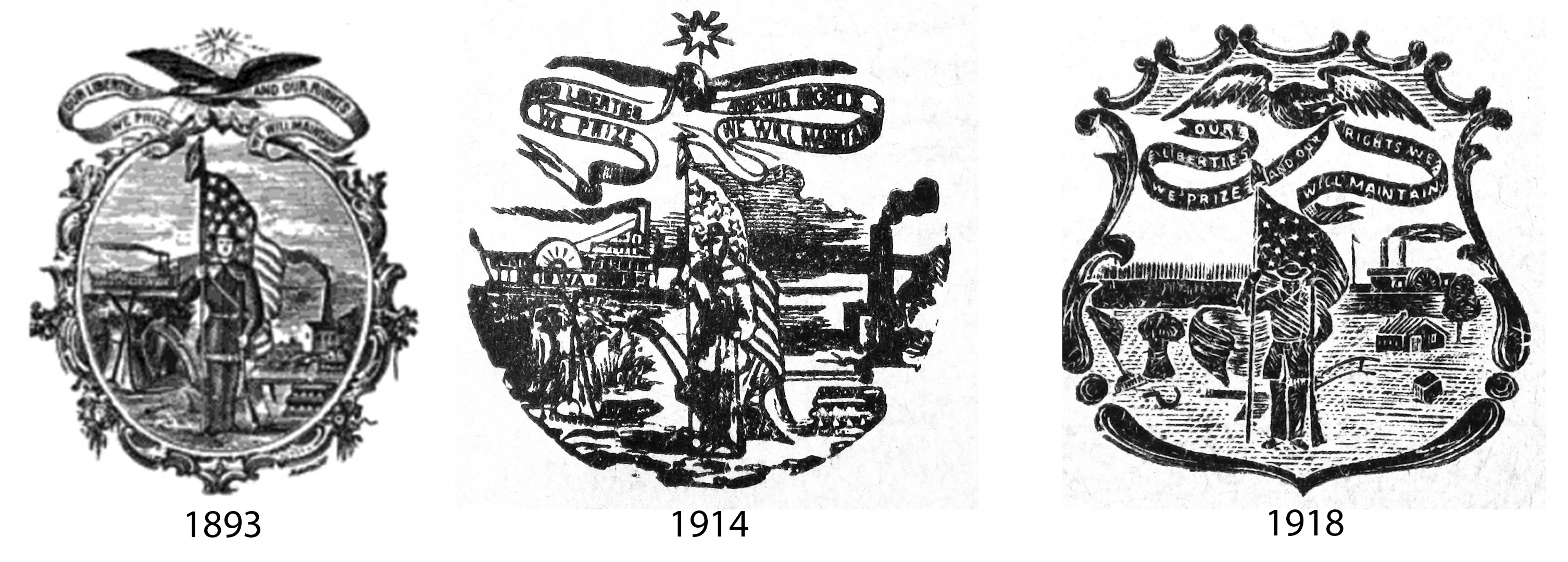
Historically there were numerous variations of the Seal of Iowa. The Reports of the Iowa Geological Survey, for example, used three different seals 1893-1918.

It was approved by the First Iowa General Assembly on February 25, 1847. Since that date, there have been no revisions to the code governing this Seal. The Seal of Iowa is kept and used by the Governor for official purposes. Because the seal was not illustrated in the Iowa code, over the years there have been several variations with differences in color and arrangement of objects.

The seal was not universally beloved when introduced, it was considered cluttered and ungainly, and the older Territorial Seal was utilized in several instances on official publications into the 1860s, including official currency. "Gov. Lowe, who, with every other gentleman of refinement, cannot but regret the bad taste that conceived and adopted the conglomerate devices of our present 'Great Seal'."

== Symbols ==
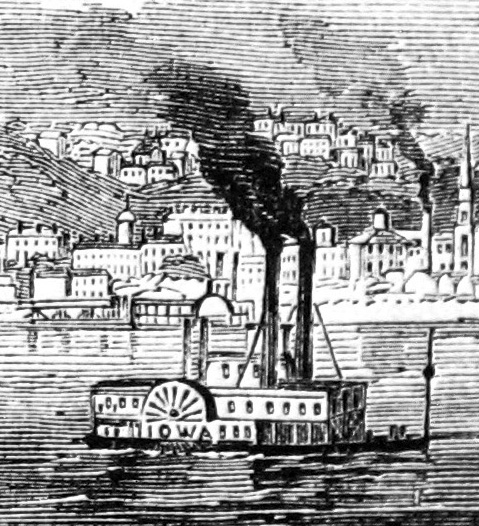
Steamboat Iowa chuffing up the Mississippi through Dubuque, Iowa, ca. 1865.

The symbols presented on the seal reflect things important to early Iowa settlers.

- Citizen soldier. The seal was approved during the Mexican–American War of 1846–1848, and the citizen soldier depicted with a "liberty cap" represents volunteer soldiers from Iowa. Battles of the Mexican-American war are memorialized in several Iowa place names, including the counties of Buena Vista, Palo Alto and Cerro Gordo. As is traditional in official symbols, weapons are held in the soldier's left hand, and items of peace and freedom in the right.
- Liberty Cap. A "liberty cap", also called a Phrygian cap, is a brimless hat resembling a tall beret that is an ancient Greek symbol of freedom. However, the soldier on the seal typically wears a wide-brimmed hat that resembles a Civil War-era Cavalry hat. Most versions of the seal put the liberty cap on top of the flag staff, in imitation of a Liberty pole.
- Wheat. Early settlers in the 1840s primarily planted wheat, and it was not until the introduction of the railroad in the 1850s and 1860s that corn became the primary crop grown in Iowa.

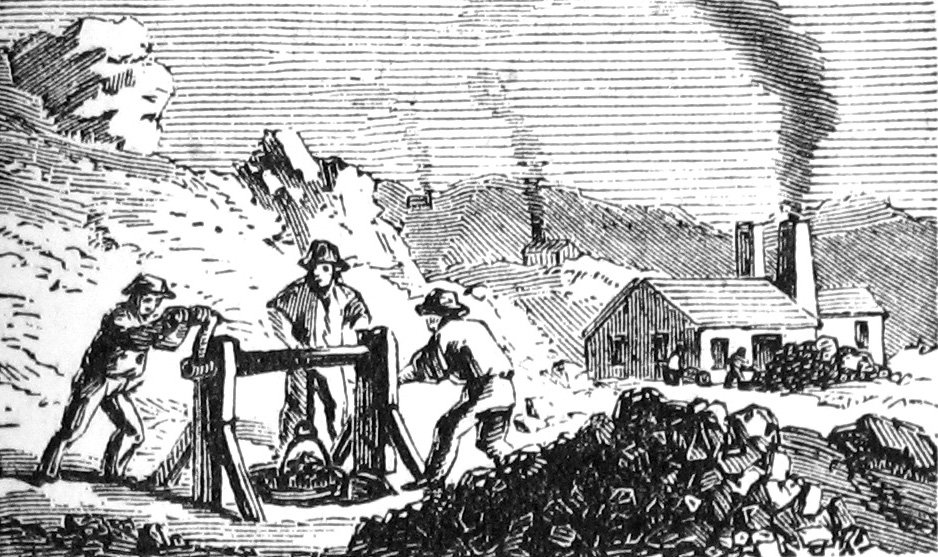
Lead mining near Dubuque, 1865, showing a mine, furnace, and slag.

- Lead. Lead mining in the Dubuque region was an early economic force; no lead is mined in Iowa today. A "pig" is a large slab of lead shaped in a furnace mold, with four corners protruding slightly to facilitate handling; thought to resemble the animal pig.
- Steamer Iowa. The Steamboat Iowa was revered as one of the largest and fastest boats on the Mississippi; it set the speed record from Galena, Illinois to St. Louis in 1843, making the trip in 44 hours, a record that held until 1849. The Mississippi was the primary route of transportation in Iowa in the 1840s, and most large Iowa towns were on or near the Mississippi.
- Eagle. The federal eagle was used in the earlier Seal of the Iowa Territory, and this symbol holding a banner with the motto of Iowa on it was incorporated into the flag of Iowa.

== "Plow in his rear" controversy ==
Concerned about portraying members of the Iowa National Guard in a poor light, in 2010 Rep. Ray Zirkelbach, a state legislator, recommended changing the text "the citizen soldier, with a plow in his rear" to "the citizen soldier, standing in front of a plow” because "in his rear" is considered a malapropism. His proposal was not considered in 2010 because of time constraints.

== Iowa territorial seal ==
The state seal supplanted the Iowa Territory seal (1838–1846), which consisted of a Federal eagle holding an arrow in its mouth and a bow in its talon. "The Seal of Iowa contains the following simple device: An Eagle In the attitude of flight grasping in its dexter talon a Bow and holding in its beak an arrow. Around the border of the seal are the words, SEAL OF THE TERRITORY OF IOWA." The territorial seal was the basis for other state seals, including the first seal of the University of Iowa and the State Historical Society of Iowa, as well as the Civil War Arms of Iowa; these later seals had the bow held in the left talon, rather than the right.

The Territorial seal was well liked as a simple image of the state and was used on state documents well into the 1860s, even after it had been officially replaced. According to the originator of the seal, territorial secretary William B. Conway, "It is regarded as perfectly expressive of a distinct idea, intimately associated with the history of the delightful country which we have the happiness to inhabit... The slightest examination of the seal will disclose to the Honorable Council the eagle, the proud and appropriate emblem of our national power, bearing in its beak an Indian arrow, and clutching in its talons an unstrung bow; and while the idea thus delicately evolved is so well calculated to make the eye glisten with patriotic pride, and cause the heart to beat high with the pulsations of conscious superiority, it nevertheless presents a touching appeal to our manly sensibilities."

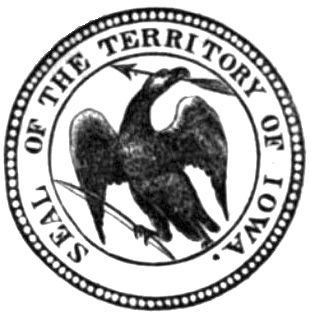
Iowa Territorial Seal, 1838.

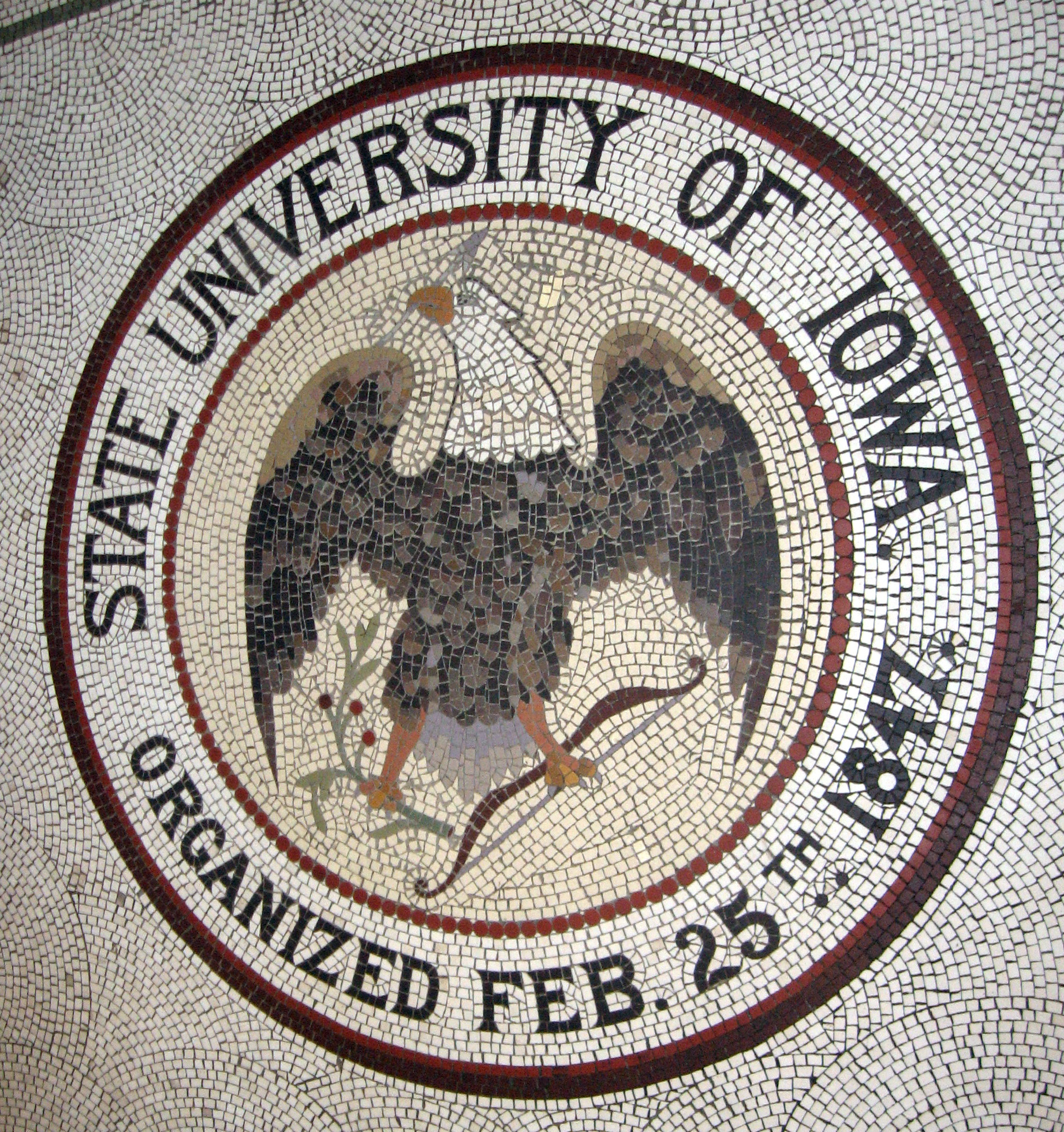
University of Iowa seal mosaic, c. 1908, based on 1847 seal.

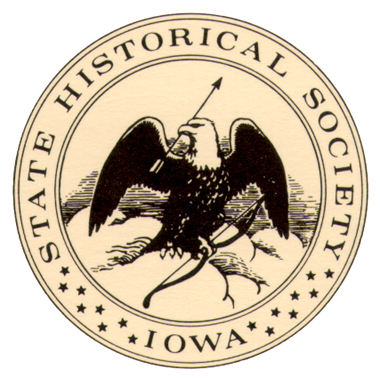
Original seal of the State Historical Society of Iowa, 1857.

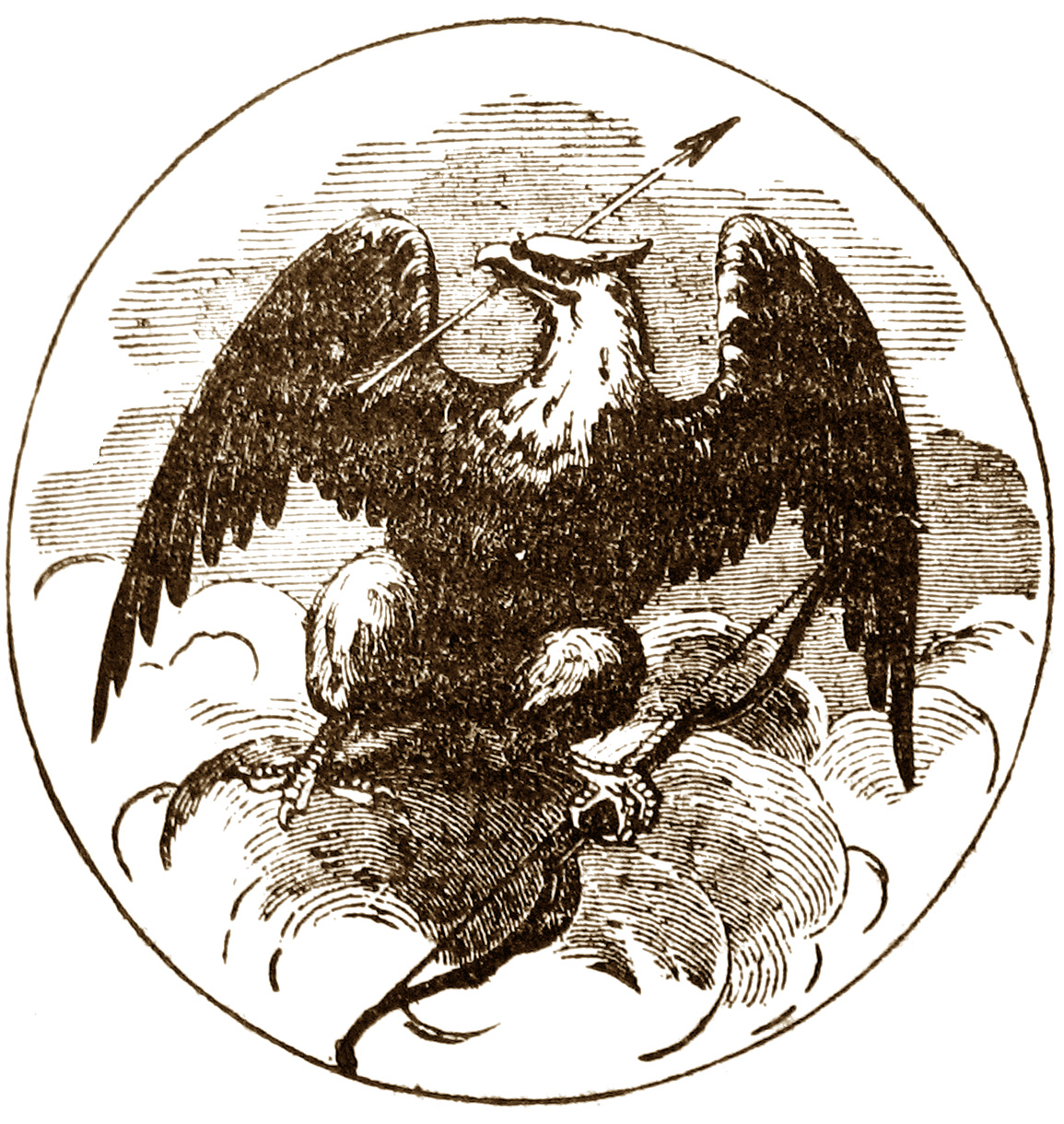
Stylized Civil War arms of Iowa, c. 1861.

== See also ==
- Symbols of the State of Iowa
