= Iowa Farmer Today =

Newspaper in Iowa, USA

- Type: Weekly newspaper
- Format: Tabloid and digital
- Owner(s): Lee Enterprises
- Publisher: Terry Reilly
- Editor: Jeff DeYoung
- Founded: September 8, 1984; 41 years ago
- Headquarters: Cedar Rapids, Iowa
- Country: United States
- Circulation: 50,000
- OCLC number: 18570772
- Website: www.agupdate.com/iowafarmertoday/

Iowa Farmer Today is a weekly newspaper, based in Cedar Rapids, Iowa, that covers Iowa for crop and livestock farmers in the Midwest.

Iowa Farmer Today was launched September 8, 1984, at a time when the tremors of the farm crisis were being felt throughout the Midwest. Publisher Steve DeWitt held discussions for several months with the Cedar Rapids Gazette for the need for a publication focused entirely on the issues facing Iowa's farmers. The complicated business of farming and the emotion of the rural lifestyle were not being fully addressed by the ag media in the early 1980s.

Since its inception, Iowa Farmer Today has reported on a range of topics, including presidential elections, evolving farm legislation, droughts, floods, the debt crisis of the early 1980s, the commodity price crisis of the late 1990s, debates on genetically modified crops, advancements in agricultural equipment, industry consolidation, and innovations in crop and livestock production. The publication also explores the unique aspects of farm families and rural lifestyles.

IFT Publications Inc., which includes Iowa Farmer Today, Illinois Farmer Today, Missouri Farmer Today and Midwest Marketer, has a home office in Cedar Rapids, Iowa, with satellite offices in Ankeny, Iowa, Malvern, Iowa, Columbia, Mo., Bloomington, Ill., and Frankfort, Ill. Iowa Farmer Today became a property of Lee Enterprises on July 1, 2004.
