= List of Iowa state symbols =

The location of the state of Iowa in the United States, highlighted in red

The state of Iowa has adopted numerous symbols through the state legislature. These symbols are listed in the Iowa Official Register.

== State symbols ==
Type	Symbol	Notes	Adopted	Image
Bird	American Goldfinch	Spinus tristis (synonym: Carduelis tristis)	1933	
Flag	Flag of Iowa	Specified in Iowa Code - Title I Chapter IB	1921	
Flower	Wild Rose	No one species is established by the legislature, but the wild prairie rose (Rosa arkansana — synonym: Rosa pratincola) is most often used.	1897	
Rock	Geode		1967	Geode
Seal	Seal of Iowa	Includes the state motto: "Our liberties we prize, and our rights we will maintain.", specified in Iowa Code - Title I Chapter IA	1847	
Song	"The Song of Iowa"	by S. H. M. Byers		
Tree	Oak	No species or variety designated	1961	
