= Iowan erosion surface =

Midwestern landform

The Iowan Erosion Surface (IES) is a geographic region located mostly in northeastern Iowa and extends into southeastern Minnesota.

== History of IES analysis ==
The IES has been a center of controversy for Quaternary workers due to its topographic relief and other elements.

Early workers proposed the notion that the surface was a glacial deposit between the early Wisconsinan and Illinoian stages. In 1968, Ruhe proposed that this area underwent a dramatic erosive event during the Late Wisconsinan.

== Geological history ==
Most of the region is underlain by pre-Illinoian till, with an age of greater than 0.5 Ma. A thin blanket of Late Wisconsinan aged loess covers the in some places. The relief of the IES itself is generally flat with broad, peculiar interfluves sitting atop of it. The broad elliptical interfluves are commonly referred to as paha and are oriented in a NW-SE (northwest to southeast) direction while each paha is generally isolated or at a distance from one another on the IES. The NW-SE orientation is attributed to Pleistocene-era oriented snowdunes that melted over the permafrost table, which then eroded and formed oriented depressions in the terrain. This was followed by episodic blankets of paleo-snow and its snowmelt to wear back the rim or scarp of the depressions which resulted in the broad, leveled, erosional plain called the Iowan Erosion Surface.
