= Judiciary of Iowa =

US state judiciary

The judiciary of Iowa is a branch of the Government of Iowa that interprets and applies the laws of Iowa, to ensure equal justice under law, and to provide a mechanism for dispute resolution. Article V of the Constitution of the State of Iowa defines the judiciary as comprising a Supreme Court, district courts, and any inferior courts established by the General Assembly.

== History ==
The judiciary of Iowa officially began its existence on June 12, 1838, when the United States Congress divided the Iowa Territory from Wisconsin, thereby establishing the "[Iowa] supreme court, probate courts, district courts, and justices of the peace". President Martin Van Buren appointed three judges to constitute Iowa's first Supreme Court: Chief Justice Charles Mason, Joseph Williams, and Thomas S. Wilson.

== Iowa Supreme Court ==
Iowa Supreme Court
- Established: 1841
- Authorised by: Iowa Constitution
- Appeals to: United States Supreme Court
- Website: http://www.iowacourts.gov/

The Iowa Supreme Court is the highest court in the U.S. state of Iowa. As constitutional head of the Iowa Judicial Branch, the Court is composed of a Chief Justice and six Associate Justices.

The Court holds its regular sessions in Des Moines in the Iowa Judicial Branch Building located at 1111 East Court Avenue on the state Capitol grounds just south of the Iowa State Capitol.

=== Duties ===
The seven-member Iowa Supreme Court has many important responsibilities.

- The Court is the "court of last resort" or the highest court in the Iowa state court system. Its opinions are binding on all other Iowa state courts.
- The Iowa Supreme Court has the sole power to admit persons to practice as attorneys in the courts of Iowa, to prescribe rules to supervise attorney conduct, and to discipline attorneys.
- The Court is responsible for promulgating rules of procedure and practice used throughout the state courts.
- The Iowa Supreme Court has supervisory and administrative control over the judicial branch and over all judicial officers and court employees.

=== Nomination of Justices ===
Justices are appointed by the governor from a list of nominees submitted by the State Judicial Nominating Commission. A justice serves an initial term of office that is one year after appointment and until January 1 following the next judicial retention election after expiration of such year. The regular term of office of justices retained at election is eight years. A justice must retire upon reaching the age of 72. The justices elect the chief justice.

== State Courts inferior to the Supreme Court ==
=== Iowa District Courts ===
Iowa District Courts are the state trial courts of general jurisdiction in the U.S. state of Iowa.

They have original jurisdiction in civil cases with any amount in controversy; felony criminal cases, domestic relations, family law, and cases involving minors (including adoption, dependency, juvenile delinquency, and probate cases.)

District judges have the authority to hear any case within the district. Felony criminal cases, adoptions, state administration issues, and many other matters come before these judges. These judges are appointed by the governor, from a list of nominees from a state nominating commission. The term for a district judge is six years.

=== State Judges Inferior to the District Courts ===
Lower courts are also established as subsidiary to the District Courts.

Associate juvenile judges only have jurisdiction over juvenile court matters.

Associate probate judges have limited jurisdiction to probate cases.

Judicial magistrates primarily serve their home county and have jurisdiction over simple misdemeanors, local infractions, and small claims.

District associate judges have the same jurisdiction as judicial magistrates, with additional authority to hear more serious misdemeanors, civil suits up to $10,000, and certain juvenile cases.

== District Court Jurisdictions ==
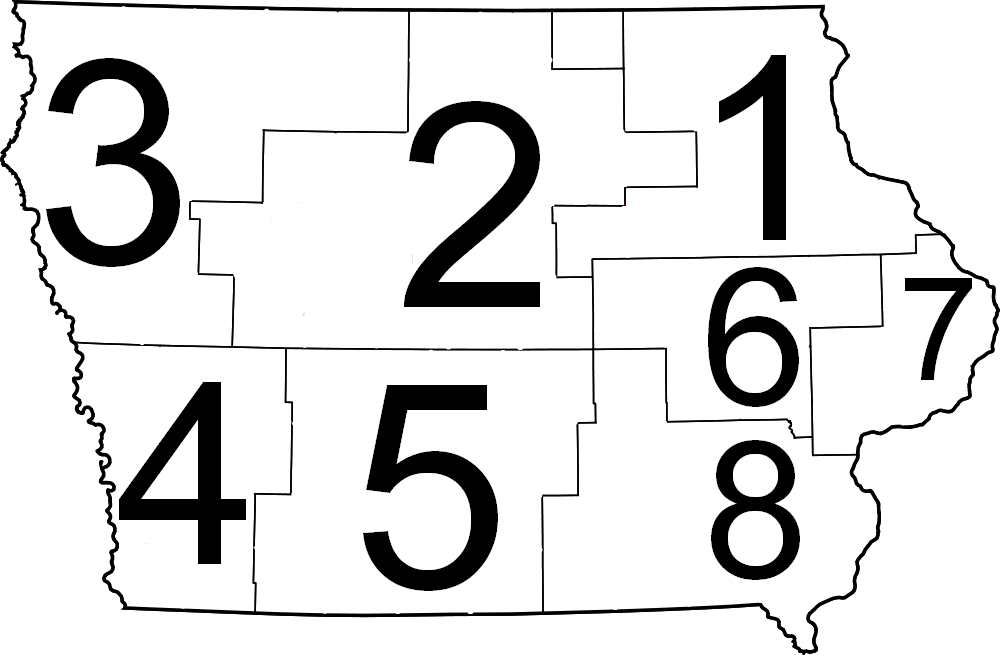
No county lines are crossed by the state judicial districts, accounting for irregular shapes and sizes

There are 8 judicial districts, each encompassing five or more of Iowa's 99 counties.

== See also ==
- Courts of Iowa
