= Iowa Animal Industry Bureau =

Agency in the US state of Iowa

The Iowa Animal Industry Bureau is the governmental agency in the state of Iowa, United States, that regulates livestock health and livestock identification. Administratively it is under the Iowa Department of Agriculture and Land Stewardship and its director is the State Veterinarian. The bureau also administratively supports the Iowa Board of Veterinary Medicine.

== Livestock identification ==
All brands for livestock used in Iowa must be registered. For the purpose of branding, livestock is defined as horses, cattle, sheep, mules, or asses (donkeys). Iowa provides electronic access to all registered brands.

== Livestock health ==
The Iowa Animal Industry Bureau maintains health programs for the following diseases:

- Avian influenza
- Bovine spongiform encephalopathy (BSE) detection
- Brucellosis and Tuberculosis Eradication
- Chronic wasting disease (CWD)
- Contagious equine metritis (CEM)
- Exotic Newcastle disease (END), a poultry disease
- Foot-and-mouth disease
- Johne's disease
- Pseudorabies
- Scrapie
- West Nile virus

In addition the bureau establishes the health requirements for the exhibition of livestock, poultry and birds at county fairs, the State Fair and district shows.
