= Leslie Richardson =

Australian cricketer

Personal information
- Born: 5 September 1911; New Town, Tasmania, Australia
- Died: 1 November 1981 (aged 70); Hobart, Tasmania, Australia

Domestic team information
- Years: Team
- 1928-1932: Tasmania
- Source: Cricinfo, 24 January 2016

Leslie Richardson (5 September 1911 – 1 November 1981) was an Australian cricketer. He played nine first-class matches for Tasmania between 1928 and 1932.

== See also ==
- List of Tasmanian representative cricketers
