= Pookey Bleum =

Pookey Bleum: (in front, seated) Jeremy Johnson, (in back, left to right) Aaron Hefley, Melissa Sorbo, Patrick Fleming

Pookey Bleum was a power pop band formed in 1996 in Ames, Iowa, U.S. The band consisted of Aaron Hefley (guitar, vocals), Melissa Sorbo (bass, vocals), Dan Thayer (lead guitar, left shortly after the band's conception), Patrick Fleming (lead guitar, 1999–2001), and Jeremy Johnson (drums). The band was one of the most popular groups in the Ames music scene (Ames is the location of Iowa State University) and members of the band founded BiFi Records. The band broke up in 2001, shortly after the release of their album Lo-Fi Rainbow.

== Biography ==
The band formed in 1996 with the line-up of Hefley, Sorbo, Thayer and Johnson. After Thayer left the band to, as they put it, "pursue real life", the other three continued out as a folk rock trio, putting out a couple of small releases that didn't attract much attention.

In 1998, the band played a benefit concert for tornado victims in Northern Iowa. It was there that they met Patrick Fleming. Fleming's talent with the guitar and wild, charismatic stage presence proved to be just what the band was looking for and invited him to join. He eventually did in 1999.

Using money Fleming inherited from his grandmother, the band purchased studio equipment and formed BiFi Records. The label operated inside a small home in residential Ames that would become affectionately known as "The BiFi House". It was on this label that they released Chords a Friend Suggested, which would become legendary in the Ames music scene. Word of mouth, as well as a presence in local music shops, combined with airplay on the local college station, KURE, gained the band a strong following.

In 2001, Pookey Bleum released LoFi Rainbow to much fanfare in the local scene. PopMatters remarked in its review of the album, "Until that happens, Pookey Bleum seems to be a decent novelty band with three good songs on Lo-Fi Rainbow and not much else."

After pressing demands in matters outside the band, Sorbo announced she would be leaving. After an attempt to find a replacement failed, the band announced their break-up. Their played their final show at the BiFi house in January 2002. They would play sporadic reunion shows shortly after that, but as of 2003, they have yet to play another show together.

=== Aftermath ===
Patrick Fleming still continues to play guitar and sing lead vocals in the 13-piece pop rock band Poison Control Center (the band includes a number of back-up singers as well as unusual instruments, such as a singing saw). Their single and EP, The Go-Go Music Show, garnered some press as the "Gem of the Month" on Todd Mundt's NPR program. They still continue to tour across the midwest.

Hefley and Johnson are now in the band Like Knives.

BiFi Records still continues to operate, although not at the same level it did at the beginning of the decade.

== Discography ==
- Pookey Bleum - released August 1998

Label: 1-D Records

- Your Favorite Music You've Never Heard Before EP - released May 1999

Label: Binary Rekkids

- Chords a Friend Suggested - Released April 2000

Label: BiFi Records

- LoFi Rainbow - Released April 2001

Label: BiFi Records

- Selfish Titled EP - Released April 2003

Label: BiFi Records
