= List of Iowa area codes =

Numbering plan areas of Iowa and neighboring regions

The state of Iowa is divided into five numbering plan areas (NPAs) in the North American Numbering Plan (NANP), with one area code assigned to each. None of the NPAs are expected to experience central office code exhaustion in the immediate future. It is one of the few states that has not implemented an overlay complex in any of its areas.

Area code	Year	Parent NPA	Numbering plan area
319	1947	–	Cedar Rapids, Waterloo, Iowa City, and Cedar Falls
515	1947	–	Des Moines, Ames, West Des Moines, Urbandale and Fort Dodge
712	1947	–	Sioux City, Council Bluffs
641	2000	515	Marshalltown, Mason City, Ottumwa, Tama
563	2001	319	Davenport, Dubuque, Bettendorf, Clinton, Muscatine

== See also ==
- "Area Code Maps". North American Numbering Plan Administrator.
