= Plug-in electric vehicles in Iowa =

As of 2022, there were about 8,400 electric vehicles (including plug-in hybrid vehicles) in Iowa, equivalent to 0.2% of all vehicles in the state.

== Government policy ==
As of 2022, the state government offers tax rebates of up to $500 for electric vehicle purchases.

As of 2022, the state government charges a $130 annual fee for electric vehicle registration. Given the EV fees charged by state, EV drivers pay approximately $152 more in tax every year than similar fossil-fuel powered car drivers.

Politicians who have led the effort to implement these fees have been found to have received significant funding from the oil and gas industry. In addition, organizations funded by the oil and gas industry, such as ALEC, are actively pushing for fee increases.

== Charging stations ==
As of April 2026, there were 484 public charging station locations with 1,269 charging ports in Iowa.

The Infrastructure Investment and Jobs Act, signed into law in November 2021, allocates US$51 million to charging stations in Iowa.

As of 2022, the state government has plans to build "alternative fuel corridors", with charging stations located every 50 miles (80 km), along I-29, I-35, I-80, and I-380.

== By region ==
=== Ames ===
As of 2022, there were 12 public charging stations in Ames.

=== Cedar Rapids ===
As of 2022, there were 16 public charging stations in Cedar Rapids.

=== Des Moines ===
As of 2022, there were about 1,900 electric vehicles registered in Polk County.

As of 2022, there were 39 public charging stations in Des Moines.

In June 2022, Polk County announced plans to introduce the first electric vehicles to the county fleet within 12 months.

=== Dubuque ===
As of January 2023, there were no electric vehicles in the Dubuque municipal fleet.

=== Iowa City ===
As of December 2021, there were 883 electric vehicles registered in Johnson County.

As of 2022, there were 33 public charging stations in Iowa City and Coralville combined.

=== Quad Cities ===
As of 2022, there were 11 public charging stations in Davenport.

=== Sioux City ===
As of August 2022, there were two public charging stations in Sioux City.
