= Iowa Sports Foundation =

- Founded: 1987
- Location: 1421 S. Bell Ave Ste 104, Ames, IA 50010
- Region served: Iowa
- Key people: Kevin Bourke(COO); Chuck Long(Executive Director)
- Employees: 11
- Website: www.iowasportsfoundation.org

The Iowa Sports Foundation (ISF) is a non-profit sports management organization that helps develop amateur sports in Iowa. It promotes positive lifestyles and physical fitness through athletic events and health education programs. The ISF hosts the Summer Iowa Games, Winter Iowa Games, Live Healthy America, Live Healthy Iowa, Live Healthy Iowa Kids, Fall Fitness Day, Go The Distance Day, Hoopin’ at the Dome, Net Fest, Fish Iowa Games, the ISF Mud Run, and the Iowa Games Golf Classic.

== History ==
The Iowa Sports Foundation, Inc. (ISF) was created on June 20, 1986 as a non-profit entity. The ISF is governed by a 33-member board of directors made up of former governors, athletic, and corporate leaders from all parts of the state.

Corporate sponsorships and entry fees provide the major source of funding for the ISF.

== Iowa Games ==
The Summer Iowa Games, powered by The Iowa Food and Family Project, began in August 1987 as a weekend event, featuring 16 sports and 7,104 participants. For the first time, weekend athletes, children and senior citizens could experience the thrill of great performances and the satisfaction of doing their best in a statewide Olympic-style competition.

Today, more than 50 sports are offered over three weekends in July. The main weekend of the Summer Iowa Games features an Opening Ceremony, Torch Run, Finals Fest, and Sunday Chapel Service.

The Winter Iowa Games, held annually in Dubuque, began in 1992. Seventeen sports were offered in 2010. Several sports are held in Cedar Rapids, while six other communities host events. Like the Summer Games, the Winter Games also offer an Opening Ceremony and Family Fun Fest.

Special Sport Events

Several other sports events were offered throughout the year including Net Fest Basketball and Volleyball tournaments, Hoopin’ at the Dome 3 on 3 basketball tournament, Iowa Games Golf Classic, Fish Iowa Games, and the ISF Mud Run.

== Live Healthy Iowa ==
Live Healthy Iowa (LHI) brings together friends, families, businesses and communities in team-based wellness challenges designed to promote positive lifestyle change. Annually more than 25,000 Iowans participate in the January through April program. The 100 Day Wellness Challenge is a simple and affordable program encouraging Iowans to make healthy choices. Over the course of 100 days, teams of 2-10 compete in friendly competition, tracking activity minutes and/or weight loss through the Live Healthy Iowa Web site.

Due to the success of Live Healthy Iowa, Live Healthy America (LHA) was created in 2006. LHA mirrors LHI; although it is a nationwide program. LHA offers Iowa companies which have employees in other states an opportunity for their entire company ti participate in a Live Healthy program.

Special Health Initiatives: Three exciting youth health initiatives, Live Healthy Iowa Kids, Go The Distance Day, and Fall Fitness Day were offered free to Iowa schools as part of LHI. Iowa school children participated in the three programs. Drawings are held to award monetary prizes to ten schools or organizations who completed the programs.

Exercise Your Character Day is a collaboration between Hy-Vee, CHARACTER COUNTS! and the ISF. Fourth and fifth graders met at Hy-Vee Hall to complete their 30 minutes of activity and heard from several celebrities including Shawn Johnson, who spoke on the importance of good character and healthy choices.

Burst Your Thirst, a six-week, team based, hydration challenge was offered in July and August. Teams tracked fluid intake and physical activity minutes.

== Adaptive Sports Iowa ==
Adaptive Sports Iowa (ASI) believes sport and recreational opportunities should not be inhibited by physical impairments. ASI strives to create, organize, and promote these opportunities to serve the population of Iowa.

ASI kicked off in March, 2011 with an inaugural summit bringing together all people who work within or serve the adaptive community. Stemming from this summit ASI was able to develop programs to meet the needs of physically disabled Iowans. ASI programs include:
-Weekly wheelchair basketball league
-ASI Ragbrai team
-ASI Winter Ski Experience

== History of Participation ==
History of Iowa Sports Foundation Participation
2011....................190,806
2010....................166,393
2009....................136,595
2008....................153,690
2007....................119,399
2006....................103,538
2005.....................72,713
2004.....................59,755
2003.....................34,744
2002.....................22,705
2001.....................21,282
2000.....................22,692
1999.....................22,333
1998.....................19,696
1997.....................17,866
1996.....................17,032
1995.....................15,710
1994.....................16,066
1993.....................13,690
1992.....................15,537
1991.....................14,369
1990.....................15,139
1989.....................11,813
1988......................9,542
1987......................7,104
