= Cedar Valley Jaguars =

- League: IBL
- Location: Waterloo, Iowa

The Cedar Valley Jaguars were a minor league basketball team based in Waterloo, Iowa. The team competed in the International Basketball League (2005-06).

== History ==
The Kings' official logo for the '05 season

Originally named the Waterloo Kings, the franchise was forced by the NBA's Sacramento Kings to change their name. The Jaguars were owned by Eddie Diaz.

The team played home games their first season at three arenas: UNI West Gym, Columbus High School, and Young Arena. All home games for the 2006 season were played at Young Arena.

The team's first IBL season was a disappointment on and off the court, finishing with a 3-14 record (ninth of the nine-team West Division). The Kings were led in scoring by Nelson Maisonet (21.4 ppg) and were coached by Anthony Thomas.

John Holmes coached the squad for the 2006 season guiding the Jaguars to a respectable 9-10 record (seventh of a 12-team East Division).

The team created a buzz when they signed Tim Hardaway in 2005 to play in several games. Dennis Rodman signed a two-game contract for the 2006 season. The news of this made national media outlets.
