= Eugene Chargers =

- Founded: 2006
- Folded: 2007
- League: IBL 2006-2007
- Team history: Eugene Chargers; 2006-2007
- Based in: Eugene, Oregon
- Arena: Morse Events Center; 2006-2007
- Colors: Red, Black
- Owner: Ingalls TeamSports
- Head coach: Chris Denker
- Championships: 0
- Dancers: Eugene Chargers Dance Team

The Eugene Chargers were a team in the International Basketball League based in Eugene, Oregon. The team was coached by Kenya Wilkins and played home games at Northwest Christian University's Morse Events Center. Founded in 2006, the team did not compete in the 2008 IBL season.

== 2006 season ==
The Chargers went 13-7 in the regular season. Guard Larry Morinia led the team in scoring, with 24.8ppg. The Chargers' attack was led by Morinia, who was an all-star, alongside center Bonell Colas (22.6 ppg) and forward J.R. Patrick (21.7 ppg)

== Roster and coaching staff ==
Roster for the 2007 season

Eugene Chargers; Current Roster
F	6'9	#8	Jay Anderson	(Oregon)
F	6'7	#6	Jamar Bohannon	(Metropolitan State)
G	6'2	#5	Charles Easterling	(Kilgore JC)
PG	6'3	#9	Andre Joseph	(Grand Valley State)
F	6'8	#21	Antwon Mills	(Fresno Pacific)
F	6'5	#7	Eric Orton	(Eastern Oregon)
PG	6'1	#1	Tryrian Ridges	(Union (NY))
C	7'2	#?	Fidel Seck	(Senegal)
F	6'8	#?	A. D. Smith	(Oregon)
G	6'4	#4	Rodrick Stevenson	(Appalachian State)
PG/G	6'3	#2	Solomon Yearby	(Campbell)
F	6'8	#20	Adam Zahn	(Oregon)

Eugene Chargers; Coaching Staff
Head Coach	Chris Denker
Assistant Coach and General Manager	Carl Berman
Assistant Coach	Don Doerner
Consultant	Kenya Wilkins

== Season by season ==
Regular Season
Year	Wins	Losses	Percentage	Division
2006	13	7	.650	T-3rd - West Division
2007	11	9	.550	3rd - Southwest Division

== All-Stars ==
=== 2006 ===
- Bonell Colas
- Larry Morinia
- J. R. Patrick
- Andy Perry
- Travis Melvin

=== 2007 ===
- Charles Easterling
- Solomon Yearby
