= Outline of Iowa =

U.S. state

Flag of Iowa

Seal of Iowa

The location of the State of Iowa within the United States

The following outline is provided as an overview of and topical guide to the U.S. state of Iowa.

Iowa is located in the Midwestern United States, and often referred to as the "American Heartland". It derives its name from the Iowa people, one of the many Native American tribes that occupied the state at the time of European exploration. Iowa was a part of the French colony of New France. After the Louisiana Purchase, settlers laid the foundation for an agriculture-based economy in the heart of the Corn Belt. Iowa is often referred to as the "Food Capital of the World".

== General reference ==
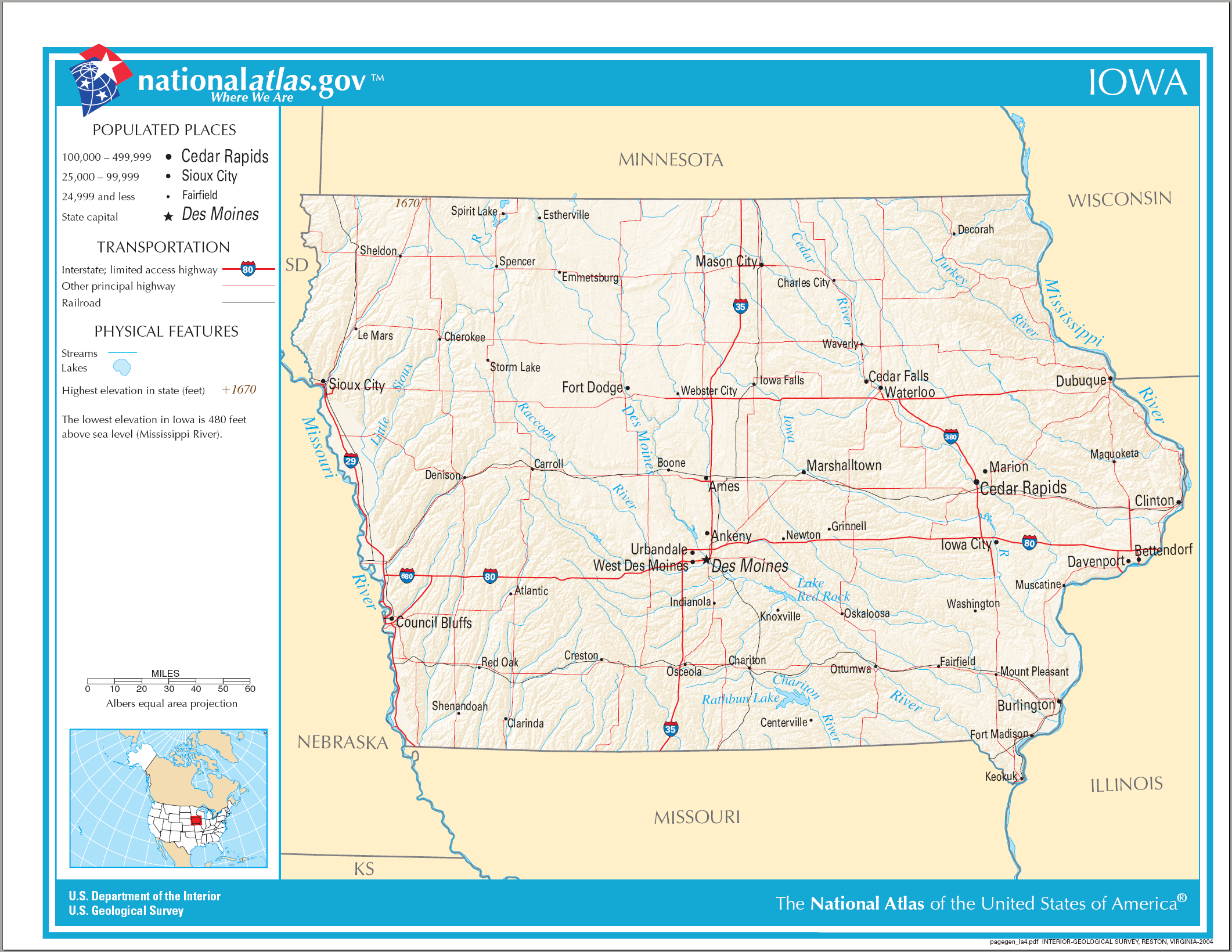
An enlargeable map of the state of Iowa

- Names
  - Common name: Iowa
    - Pronunciation: /ˈaɪoʊ.ə, -əwə/
  - Official name: State of Iowa
  - Abbreviations and name codes
    - Postal symbol: IA
    - ISO 3166-2 code: US-IA
    - Internet second-level domain: .ia.us
  - Nicknames
    - Hawkeye State
    - Land of the Rolling Prairie
    - Tall Corn State
- Adjectival: Iowa
- Demonym: Iowan

== Geography of Iowa ==
- Geography of Iowa
- Administration: U.S. state, a federal state of the United States
- Location
  - Northern Hemisphere
  - Western Hemisphere
    - Americas
      - North America
        - Anglo America
        - Northern America
          - United States of America
            - Contiguous United States
              - Central United States
                - Corn Belt
                - West North Central States
              - Midwestern United States
- Population: 3,046,355 (2010 U.S. Census)
- Area: 56,272.81 sq mi (145,746 km^{2})

=== Places in Iowa ===
- National Historic Landmarks in Iowa
- National Register of Historic Places listings in Iowa
  - Bridges on the National Register of Historic Places in Iowa
- National Natural Landmarks in Iowa
- State parks in Iowa

=== Environment of Iowa ===
Environment of Iowa

- Climate of Iowa
- Geology of Iowa
- Protected areas in Iowa
  - State forests of Iowa
- Superfund sites in Iowa
- Wildlife of Iowa
  - Fauna of Iowa
    - Birds of Iowa

==== Natural geographic features of Iowa ====
- Rivers of Iowa

=== Regions of Iowa ===
- Northern Iowa

==== Administrative divisions of Iowa ====
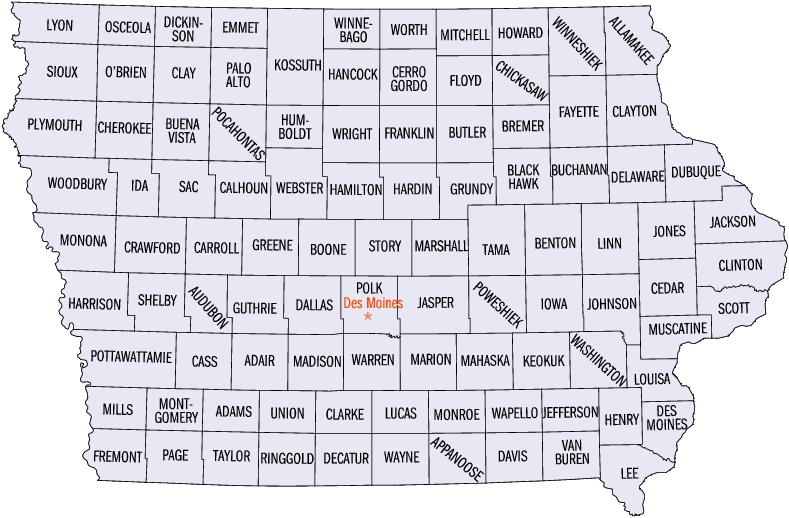
An enlargeable map of the 99 counties of the state of Iowa

- The 99 counties of the state of Iowa
  - List of Iowa townships, which are administrative divisions of the county government
  - Municipalities in Iowa
    - Cities in Iowa
      - State capital of Iowa: Des Moines
      - City nicknames in Iowa
    - Unincorporated communities in Iowa

=== Demography of Iowa ===
Demographics of Iowa

== Government and politics of Iowa ==
- Form of government: U.S. state government
- Iowa's congressional delegations
- Iowa State Capitol
- Elections in Iowa
- Political party strength in Iowa

=== Branches of the Government of Iowa ===
==== Executive branch of the government of Iowa ====
- Governor of Iowa
  - Lieutenant Governor of Iowa
  - Secretary of State of Iowa
  - Attorney General of Iowa
- State departments
  - Iowa Department of Transportation

==== Legislative branch of the government of Iowa ====
- Iowa General Assembly (bicameral)
  - Upper house: Iowa Senate
  - Lower house: Iowa House of Representatives

==== Judicial branch of the government of Iowa ====
Courts of Iowa

- Supreme Court of Iowa

=== Law and order in Iowa ===
Law of Iowa

- Cannabis in Iowa
- Constitution of Iowa
- Crime in Iowa
- Gun laws in Iowa
- Law enforcement in Iowa
  - Law enforcement agencies in Iowa
    - Iowa State Police
- Same-sex marriage in Iowa

=== Military in Iowa ===
- Iowa Air National Guard
- Iowa Army National Guard

== History of Iowa ==
History of Iowa

=== History of Iowa, by period ===
The location of the state of Iowa in the United States of America

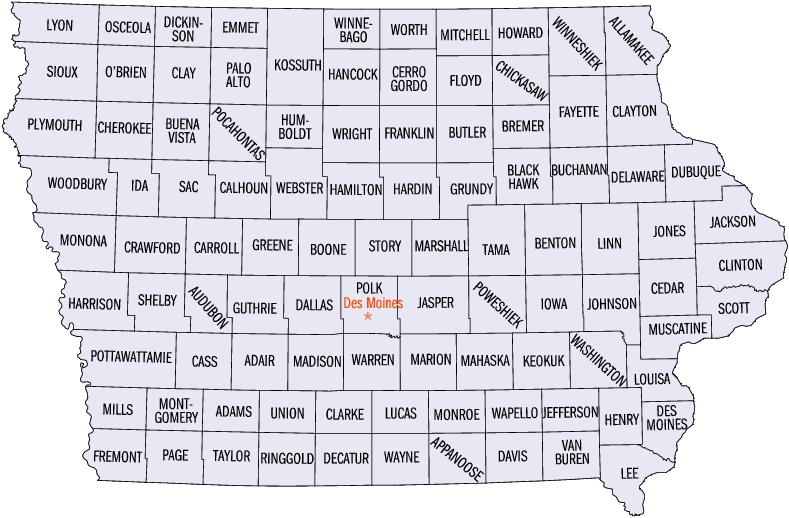
An enlargeable map of the 99 counties of the state of Iowa

- Prehistory of Iowa
  - Indigenous peoples
  - Iowa archaeology
- French colony of Louisiane, 1699–1764
  - Treaty of Fontainebleau of 1762
- Spanish (though predominantly Francophone) district of Alta Luisiana, 1764–1803
  - Third Treaty of San Ildefonso of 1800
- French district of Haute-Louisiane, 1803
  - Louisiana Purchase of 1803
- Unorganized U.S. territory created by the Louisiana Purchase, 1803–1804
  - Lewis and Clark Expedition, 1804–1806
- District of Louisiana, 1804–1805
- Territory of Louisiana, 1805–1812
- Territory of Missouri, 1812–1821
- Unorganized Territory, (1821–1834)–1854
- Territory of Michigan, 1805–(1834–1836)–1837
- Territory of Wisconsin, (1836–1838)-1848
  - Honey War, 1837–1851
- Territory of Iowa, 1838–1846
  - Mexican–American War, April 25, 1846 – February 2, 1848
- State of Iowa becomes 29th State admitted to the United States of America on December 28, 1846
  - American Civil War, April 12, 1861 – May 13, 1865
    - Iowa in the American Civil War
  - First transcontinental railroad completed 1869
  - Herbert Hoover becomes 31st President of the United States on March 4, 1929

=== History of Iowa, by region ===
- History of Davenport, Iowa
- History of Dubuque, Iowa
- History of Sioux City, Iowa

=== History of Iowa, by subject ===
- Archeology of Iowa
  - Archaeological sites in Iowa
    - Blood Run Site
    - Chan-Ya-Ta Site
    - Cherokee Sewer Site
    - Edgewater Park Site
    - Effigy Mounds National Monument
    - Fish Farm Mounds State Preserve
    - Folkert Mound Group
    - Fort Atkinson State Preserve
    - Hartley Fort State Preserve
    - Little Maquoketa River Mounds State Preserve
    - Phipps Site
    - Plum Grove Historic House
    - Slinde Mounds State Preserve
    - Toolesboro Mound Group
- History of Iowa Hawkeyes football
- List of Iowa state legislatures
- Native American history of Iowa
  - Appanoose
  - Half-Breed Tract
  - Ho-Chunk
  - Keokuk (Sauk chief)
  - Keokuk's Reserve
  - Meskwaki
  - Neapope
  - Potawatomi
  - Quashquame
  - Sac (people)
  - Sac and Fox Nation
  - Sauganash
  - Taimah
  - University of Iowa Museum of Natural History
  - Watseka

== Culture of Iowa ==
Culture of Iowa

- Cuisine of Iowa
- Museums in Iowa
- Religion in Iowa
  - Episcopal Diocese of Iowa
- Scouting in Iowa
- State symbols of Iowa
  - Flag of the State of Iowa
  - Great Seal of the State of Iowa

=== The Arts in Iowa ===
- Music of Iowa

=== Sports in Iowa ===
Sports in Iowa

== Economy and infrastructure of Iowa ==
Economy of Iowa

- Agriculture in Iowa
- Communications in Iowa
  - Newspapers in Iowa
  - Radio stations in Iowa
  - Television stations in Iowa
- Energy in Iowa
  - List of power stations in Iowa
  - Solar power in Iowa
  - Wind power in Iowa
- Health care in Iowa
  - Hospitals in Iowa
- Transportation in Iowa
  - Airports in Iowa
  - Roads in Iowa

== Education in Iowa ==
Education in Iowa

- Schools in Iowa
  - School districts in Iowa
    - High schools in Iowa
  - Private schools in Iowa
  - Colleges and universities in Iowa
    - University of Iowa
    - Iowa State University

== See also ==
- Topic overview:
  - Iowa
  - Index of Iowa-related articles
