= Archaeology of Iowa =

Research in the American state

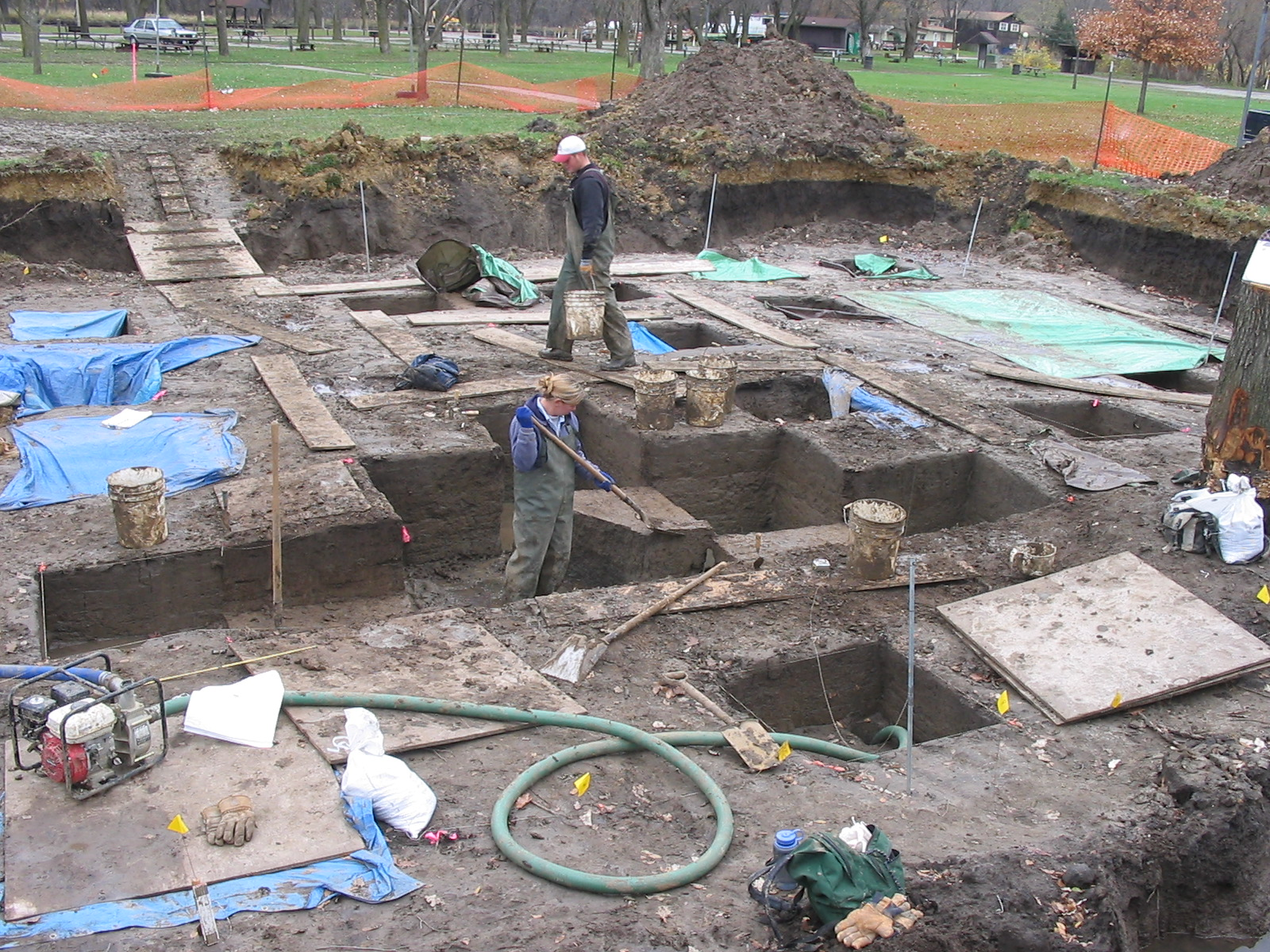
Excavations at the Late Archaic Edgewater Park Site in Coralville

The archaeology of Iowa is the study of the buried remains of human culture within the U.S. state of Iowa from the earliest prehistoric through the late historic periods. When the American Indians first arrived in what is now Iowa more than 13,000 years ago, they were hunters and gatherers living in a Pleistocene glacial landscape. By the time European explorers visited Iowa, American Indians were largely settled farmers with complex economic, social, and political systems. This transformation happened gradually. During the Archaic period (10,500–2,800 years ago) American Indians adapted to local environments and ecosystems, slowly becoming more sedentary as populations increased. More than 3,000 years ago, during the Late Archaic period, American Indians in Iowa began utilizing domesticated plants. The subsequent Woodland period saw an increase on the reliance on agriculture and social complexity, with increased use of mounds, ceramics, and specialized subsistence. During the Late Prehistoric period (beginning about AD 900) increased use of maize and social changes led to social flourishing and nucleated settlements. The arrival of European trade goods and diseases in the Protohistoric period led to dramatic population shifts and economic and social upheaval, with the arrival of new tribes and early European explorers and traders. During the Historical period European traders and American Indians in Iowa gave way to American settlers and Iowa was transformed into an agricultural state.

== Iowa archaeologists ==
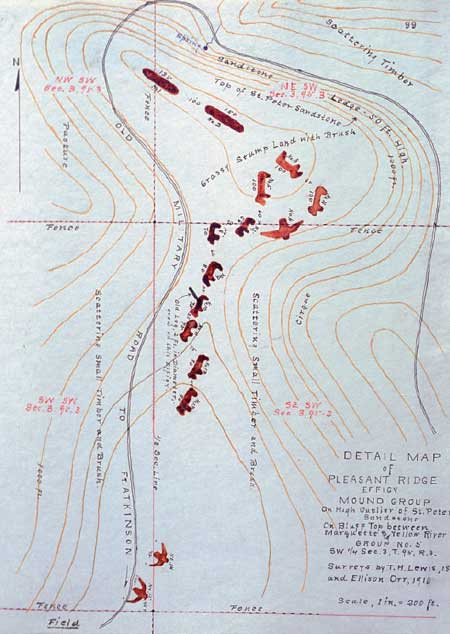
Ellison Orr’s and Theodore Lewis’ 1910 sketch of effigy mounds near McGregor, Iowa, now part of Effigy Mounds National Monument.

Archaeologists have studied the prehistory of Iowa since the mid-19th century, when large American Indian mounds were first observed along the Mississippi. Early archaeologists such as S.V. Proudfit and Theodore Lewis documented large sites such as earthworks, mounds, and earthlodges. Truly systematic recording of Iowa sites began with Charles R. Keyes and Ellison Orr’s surveys and excavations beginning in the 1920s. Documenting hundreds of sites, often just before they disappeared under the plow, Keyes’ and Orr’s work led to the formation of the Iowa Archaeological Survey, the Iowa Archeological Society, and the designation of Effigy Mounds National Monument. After their deaths in 1951, the Survey was disbanded, and their efforts were continued by the University of Iowa’s Department of Sociology and Anthropology, which formed the Office of the State Archaeologist (OSA) in 1959. The OSA maintains an extensive list of more than 23,000 recorded archaeological sites in Iowa, and conducts survey and excavation across the state. Other institutions conducting archaeological research in Iowa include the State Historical Society of Iowa, the Iowa Archeological Society, the University of Iowa, Iowa State University, Grinnell College, Luther College, and private archaeological firms. Professional archaeologists in Iowa are represented by the Association of Iowa Archaeologists. Iowa archaeology grew dramatically beginning in the 1960s with the introduction of Cultural Resources Management legislation that required archaeological survey and excavation at many federal projects in Iowa.

== Paleoindian (13,500–10,500 years ago) ==
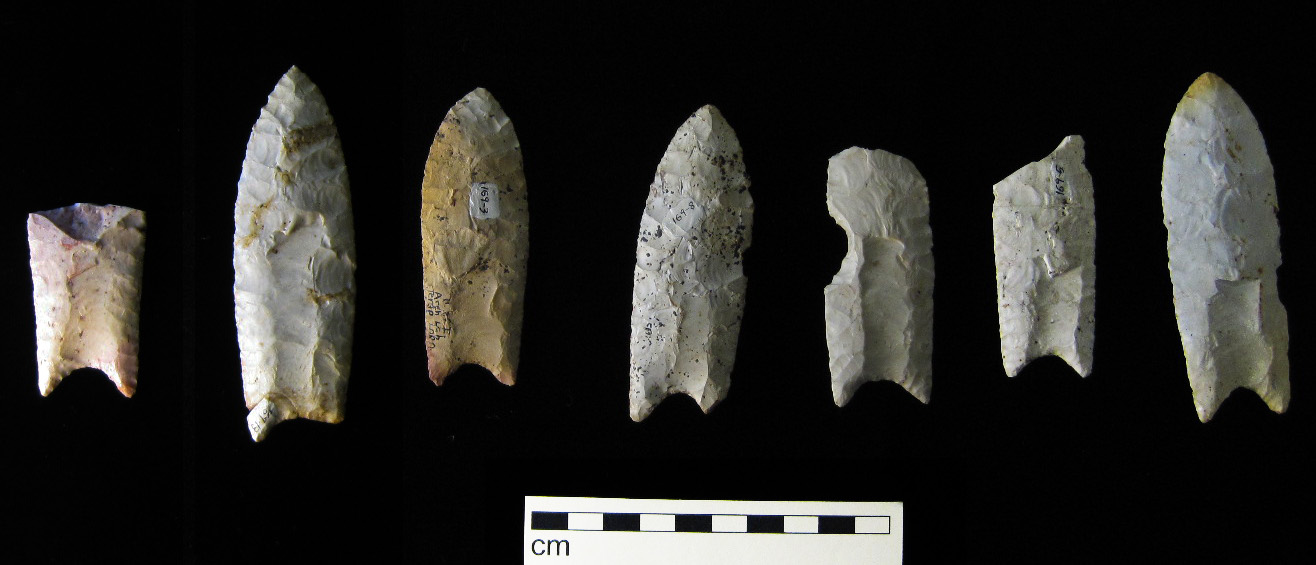
Clovis points from the Rummells-Maske Cache Site, Cedar County, Iowa.

Paleoindian hunters and gatherers were the first occupants of Iowa, entering the state at the end of the Pleistocene glacial period. At the time the state was covered by tundra, conifer forests, and deciduous forests. Areas immediately north of Des Moines extending to Minnesota were covered by the receding Des Moines Lobe, a large glacier system. Highly mobile, their sites are scattered across Iowa and are noted for their large stone points. While Paleoindians were traditionally viewed as big game hunters, more recent research suggests much of their subsistence was derived from small game and wild plants. Paleoindian points are found throughout Iowa, but almost no intact Paleoindian sites have been excavated, probably because they were ephemeral and are now either destroyed by plowing or are very deeply buried in river valleys.

=== Clovis and other Early Paleoindian ===
The oldest artifacts found in Iowa are Clovis points, large lanceolate points found occasionally in all parts of the state except for the Des Moines Lobe. Possible sources of game were giant Pleistocene megafauna, including mammoth, mastodon, and giant forms of bison, all of which are now extinct. While widespread, only two Clovis sites have been excavated in Iowa. The Rummells-Maske site is a Clovis site in Cedar County; unfortunately, this site was damaged by plowing, although 20 points and point fragments were recovered. The Carlisle Clovis Cache Site in Warren County contained 38 unfinished stone tools that appear to date to the Clovis period, but these results have not yet been published.

Other Iowa Early Paleoindian points include Gainey, a point that appears to be intermediate between Clovis and Folsom. Gainey points were also recovered at Rummells-Maske. While Folsom points are found throughout Iowa, especially western Iowa, none have been excavated in a well-preserved site.

=== Dalton and other Late Paleoindian ===
At the beginning of the glacial-free Holocene Epoch, humans in Iowa utilized projectile point found throughout the mid-continent, including Dalton, Fayette, Agate Basin, and Hell Gap. Humans were still highly mobile, and by this time most of the Pleistocene megafauna had gone extinct. As with the Early Paleoindian period, no intact Late Paleoindian sites have been excavated in Iowa.

== Archaic Period ==
The Archaic is the longest period of Iowa prehistory, lasting about 8,000 years. Overall, populations appear to have increased in Iowa during the Archaic, despite a changing climate. During this time American Indians transitioned from highly mobile hunters and gatherers with large ranges towards a focus on local resources and ecosystems. Domesticated plants appeared in Iowa towards the end of the Archaic.

=== Early Archaic (10,500–7,500 years ago) ===
During the Early Archaic period regional variation in point forms is seen in Iowa, and Indians adapted to more localized forms of hunting and gathering while probably maintaining seasonal movements from camp to camp. Common stone tool types are Corner-notched St. Charles points and Thebes Knives. Soon Hardin and Kirk points appear in Iowa as well. Excavated Early Archaic sites in Iowa include the Soldow Site, Horizons IIIa and II of the Cherokee Sewer Site, and the Simonsen Site.

=== Middle Archaic (7,500–5,000 years ago) ===
Temperatures rose in the mid-continent during the Middle Archaic, a warming trend known as the Hypsithermal. Grasslands expanded east, forests became less common, and many Iowa lakes shrank or disappeared. Humans responded by diversifying their subsistence strategy: eastern Iowa saw a shift towards river resources, and western Iowa towards Plains resources. Excavated sites in eastern and central Iowa include the Palace Site, the Brash Site, the Gast Spring Site, and the Ed’s Meadow Site. Western Iowa sites include the Turin Site, Horizon I of the Cherokee Sewer Site, and the Pony Creek Site.

=== Late Archaic (5,000–2,800 years ago) ===
In the Late Archaic the climate became more similar to modern with the end of the Hypsithermal. The number of Late Archaic Sites increased in Iowa, perhaps reflective of increased populations allowed by climate change and new subsistence strategies. The Late Archaic sees the first indication of mound building in Iowa, as well as direct evidence of domesticated plants, and large, long-term settlements. The Red Ocher Culture appeared in northeast Iowa, associated with copper artifacts and mound building. Numerous Late Archaic sites have been excavated in eastern Iowa, some showing the gradual adaptation of cultigens, including squash, little barley, marsh elder, and barnyard grass. Sites with evidence for early cultigens in Iowa include the Edgewater Park Site in Coralville, the Gast Spring Site, and the Sand Run Slough West Site. In western Iowa, Late Archaic sites are common, however large bison killing or processing sites are less common than before, and there is little evidence for the use of domesticated plants.

== Woodland Period ==
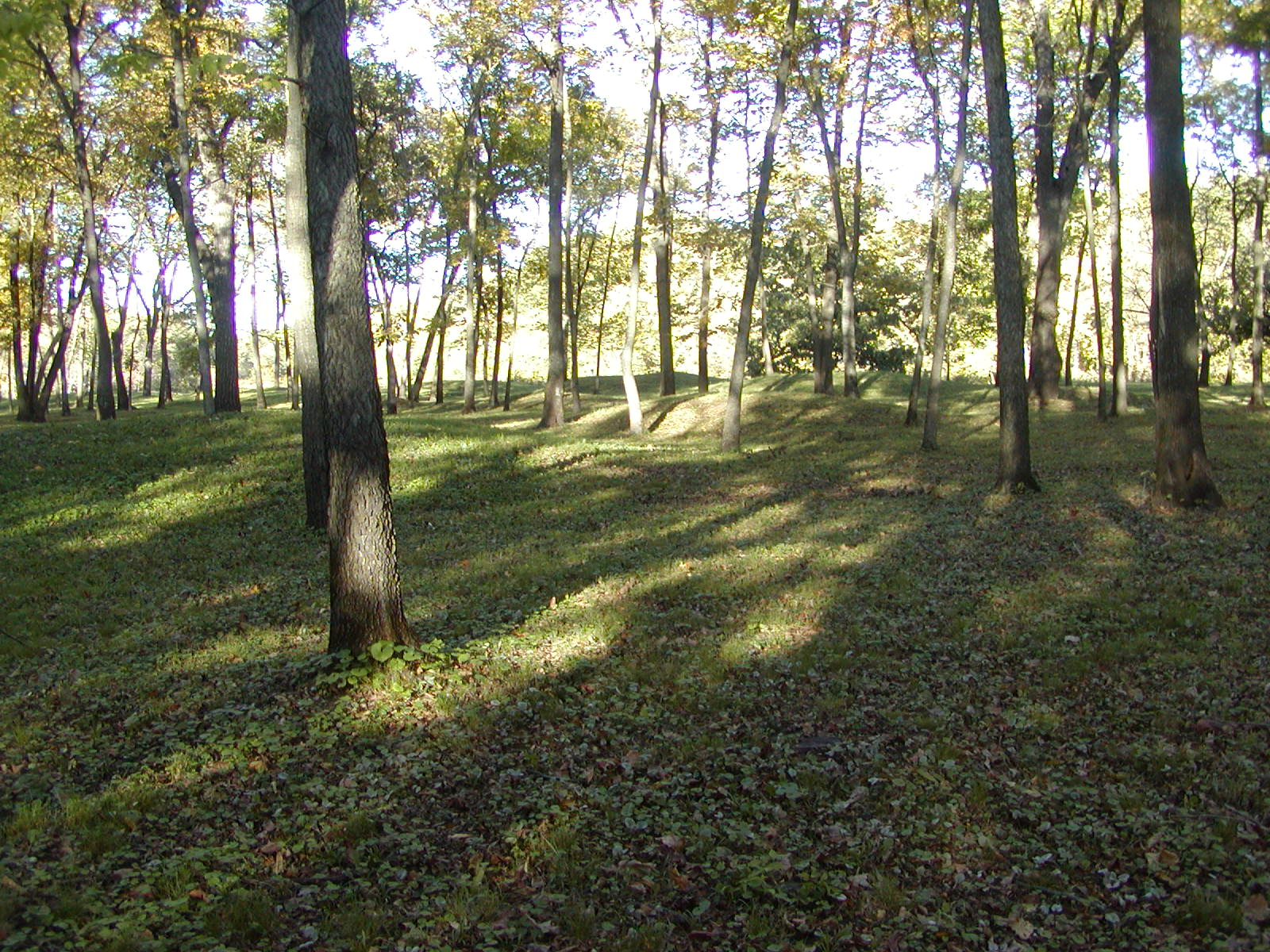
Woodland conical mounds at Effigy Mounds National Monument, Sny Magill Unit, Clayton County, Iowa.

During the Woodland period, many American Indians in Iowa shifted away from hunting and gathering and used more domesticated plants, although wild food was still important. Ceramics, the bow and arrow, burial mounds, and evidence of political and social hierarchy became common at Woodland sites in Iowa.

=== Early Woodland (800 BC–200 BC) ===
The Early Woodland period saw the introduction of ceramics to Iowa, including Marion Thick and Black Sand types. Marion Thick may have originated with the nucleated Late Archaic cultures of the Upper Midwest, and was widespread in distribution. Early Woodland Indians in eastern Iowa built large burial mounds in the Mississippi River region, and participated in long-distance trade of exotic raw material. This long-distance trade may have been the forerunner of the later Havanna-Hopewell trading sphere. In north-central Iowa, Early Woodland peoples appear to have interacted more directly with the Prairie Lakes region of Minnesota. Numerous Early Woodland sites have been excavated in Iowa, including the Gast Spring Site, and many sites which have not been formally published.

=== Middle Woodland (200 BC–400 AD) ===
The Middle Woodland Indians of eastern Iowa participated at the edge of the Havana and Hopewell interaction networks. This cultural connection to the East is seen in the construction of large mounds, earthworks, and the trade of exotic goods over very long distances. There were several large earthwork enclosures in Iowa along the Mississippi that date to the Middle Woodland period, but none in the interior of the state, indicating Iowa is the western edge of Havana-Hopewell influence. The Toolesboro Mound Group in Louisa County included a large octagonal earthen enclosure that covered several acres; earthworks of this style are indicative of the monumental construction once seen in Havana, Illinois along the Illinois River and sites in the Ohio River drainage including Chillicothe and Newark, Ohio. Hopewell trading networks were quite extensive, with obsidian from the Yellowstone area, copper from Lake Superior, and shells from the Gulf Coast appearing in Middle Woodland Iowa sites. Sites in eastern Iowa appeared to nucleate, vacating much of the hinterlands. Western Iowa appears to have been not directly involved in this exchange network, and the Havana-Hopewell flourishing did not extend much above the Kansas City area of the Missouri River.

=== Late Woodland (400–1250 AD) ===
The Late Woodland Period was once considered to be relatively unimportant and uninteresting compared to earlier and later periods, but recent research shows unexpected cultural complexity. Late Woodland sites are more dispersed than Middle Woodland sites, but they are apparently more numerous. Gone are the complex earthworks and long-distance trade networks, but this does not appear to be a cultural collapse, since Late Woodland sites and artifact types overlap with and transition from Middle Woodland sites. Technical changes of the Late Woodland include the use of true arrow heads, thinner and larger ceramics with less elaborate decorations, and the adaptation of new crops, including maize. Numerous regional variations and phases have been defined in Iowa, based in large extent on differences of ceramic form and decoration. Excavations at Late Woodland sites are common, some of these sites showing surprising complexity. The Gast Farm Site excavations revealed a complex settlement associated with a midden of refuse 100 m in diameter. Large storage and food processing pits, trash middens, and other features were excavated. Occupants utilized acorns, other nuts and fruits, goosefoot, little barley, maygrass, sunflower, fish, birds, deer, muskrat, and turtle. There was little evidence of long-distance trade. The Rainbow and M.A.D. sites provide a glimpse into the Late Archaic of western Iowa. At Rainbow, a large house was excavated, showing evidence of reuse and possible joint occupation by two families. Mound building became more common during the Late Woodland Period, large groups of mounds appeared including the Slinde Mound Group, and the Fish Farm Mound Group.

=== Effigy Mounds ===
The Late Woodland in Iowa is perhaps best known for effigy mounds, large, low mounds shaped like animals such as birds and bears. Effigy mounds are distributed across southern Wisconsin, northern Illinois, and northeast Iowa. A large concentration of mounds in several groups is preserved at Effigy Mounds National Monument. Like most mounds in Iowa, excavation reveals that these mounds were commonly used as sacred burial locations but contain few artifacts. Recent ground-penetrating radar survey of selected mounds at Effigy Mounds National Monument reveal that many are badly disturbed, but others appear to be comparatively intact. The Folkert Mound Group in central Iowa contains an enigmatic cruciform mound that may or may not be astronomically aligned.

== Late Prehistoric (900–1600) ==
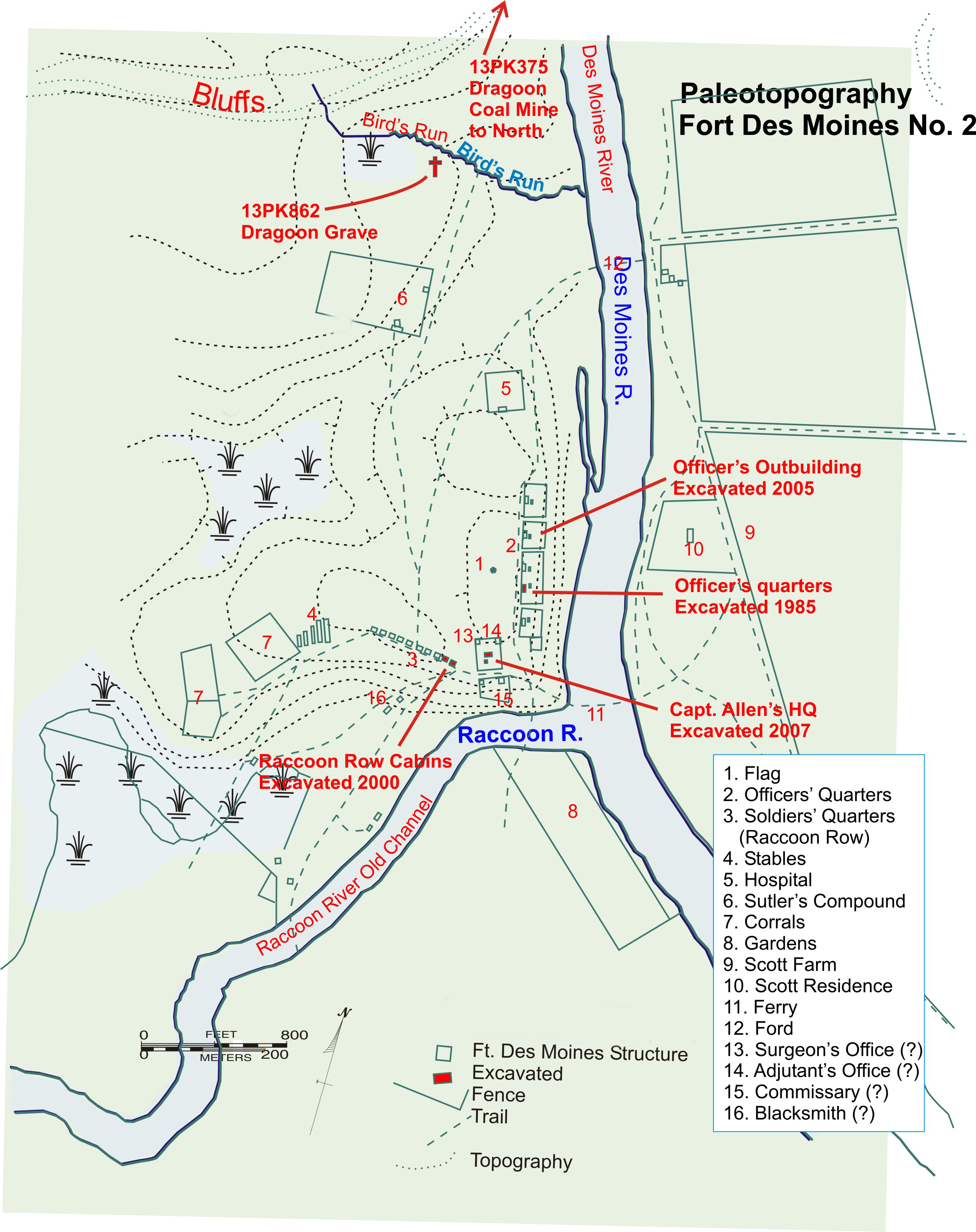
Map of archaeology of Fort Des Moines in downtown Des Moines

Maize appears to have been the catalyst for change in the Late Prehistoric period in Iowa. While maize had been a minor crop in the Woodland Period, many archaeologists believe new varieties of maize were introduced to the region that produced higher yields, allowing for a population boom. This increase in population, combined with the potential for surplus and growing tensions over control of territory, appears to have led to large nucleated settlements throughout the eastern U.S. Although this manifested itself earliest along the Mississippi south of Iowa, the earliest Late Prehistoric cultures appeared in the western part of the state.

=== Great Oasis (ca. 900–1100) ===
Great Oasis sites appeared in the Missouri River drainage, and have attributes of both Late Woodland and Late Prehistoric cultures. Great Oasis cultures extended through the eastern Plains from Iowa to South Dakota. Developing independently from the eastern Mississippian cultures, Great Oasis sites display large sites along major stream terraces, increased reliance on agriculture combined with hunting and gathering, substantial pit earth lodges, and a transition from Late Woodland to Late Prehistoric ceramic forms. Overall, Great Oasis appears to have been a regional adaptation of new forms of farming and settlement patterns, including seasonal occupation of different ecological zones, that includes aspects of Late Woodland and the subsequent Middle Missouri Tradition.

=== Mill Creek and Glenwood (1100–1300) ===
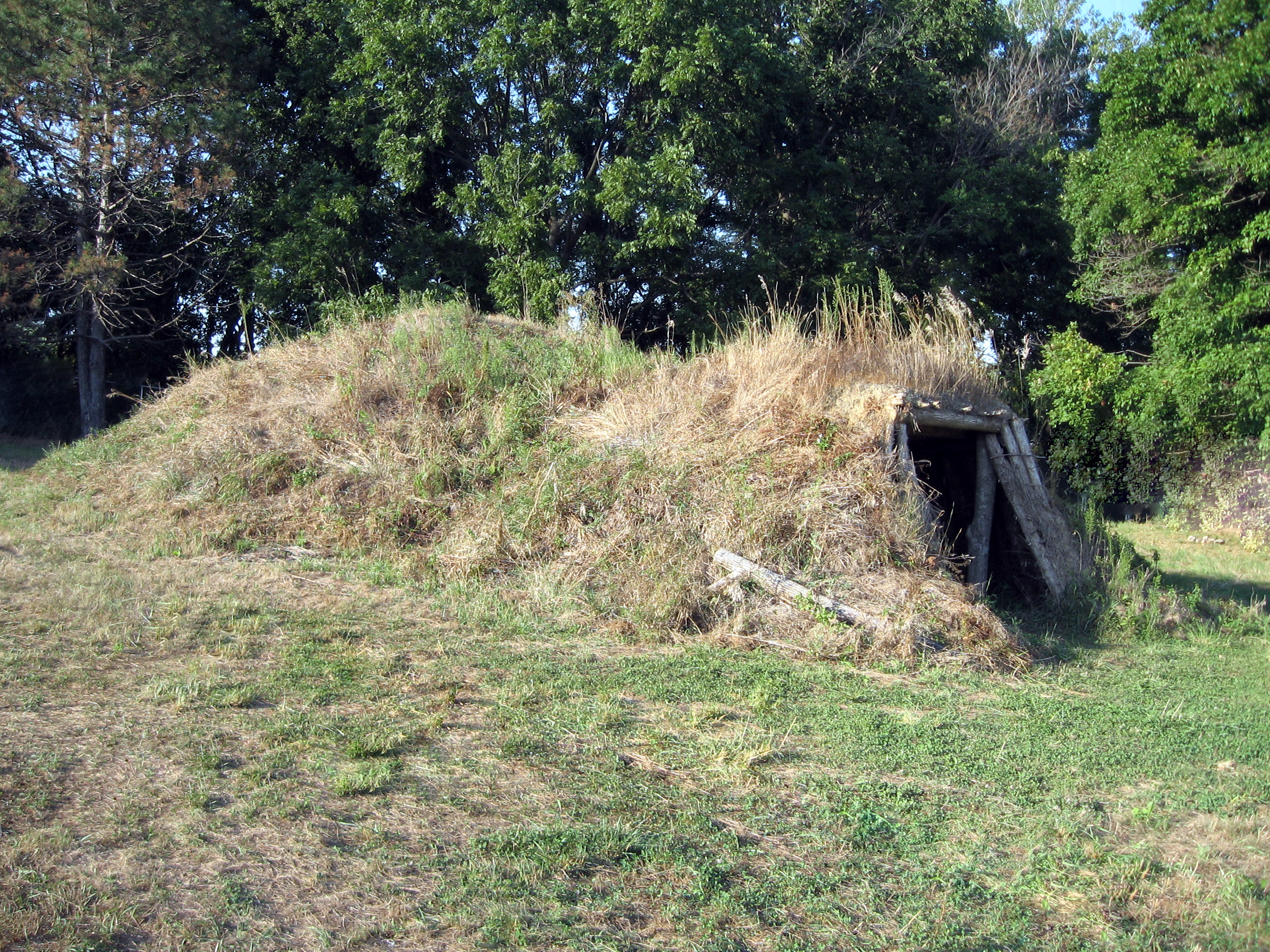
Reconstructed Glenwood earthlodge, Glenwood, Iowa

In northwestern Iowa, Great Oasis underwent dramatic changes as Mill Creek sites appeared. While Mill Creek has many stylistic similarities with Great Oasis and some Mill Creek sites contain Great Oasis ceramic forms, Mill Creek sites are substantially different. Mill Creek sites became nucleated, often fortified, had a much higher dependence on maize and bison hunting, show substantial evidence of long-distance trade, and appear to have been occupied year-round. The Phipps and Chan-Ya-Ta sites are classic examples. Glenwood culture sites in southwest Iowa near the Missouri River appear to be unrelated to the earlier Great Oasis sites, and are notable for their large earthlodge sites. Glenwood sites appear to have been more oriented in lifeways and trade with the Central Plains Tradition cultures to the west than with the Mississippian cultures to the southeast. Around 1300 AD Mill Creek and Glenwood sites in Iowa disappeared, replaced by the rapidly spreading Oneota cultures.

=== Oneota (1250–1700) ===
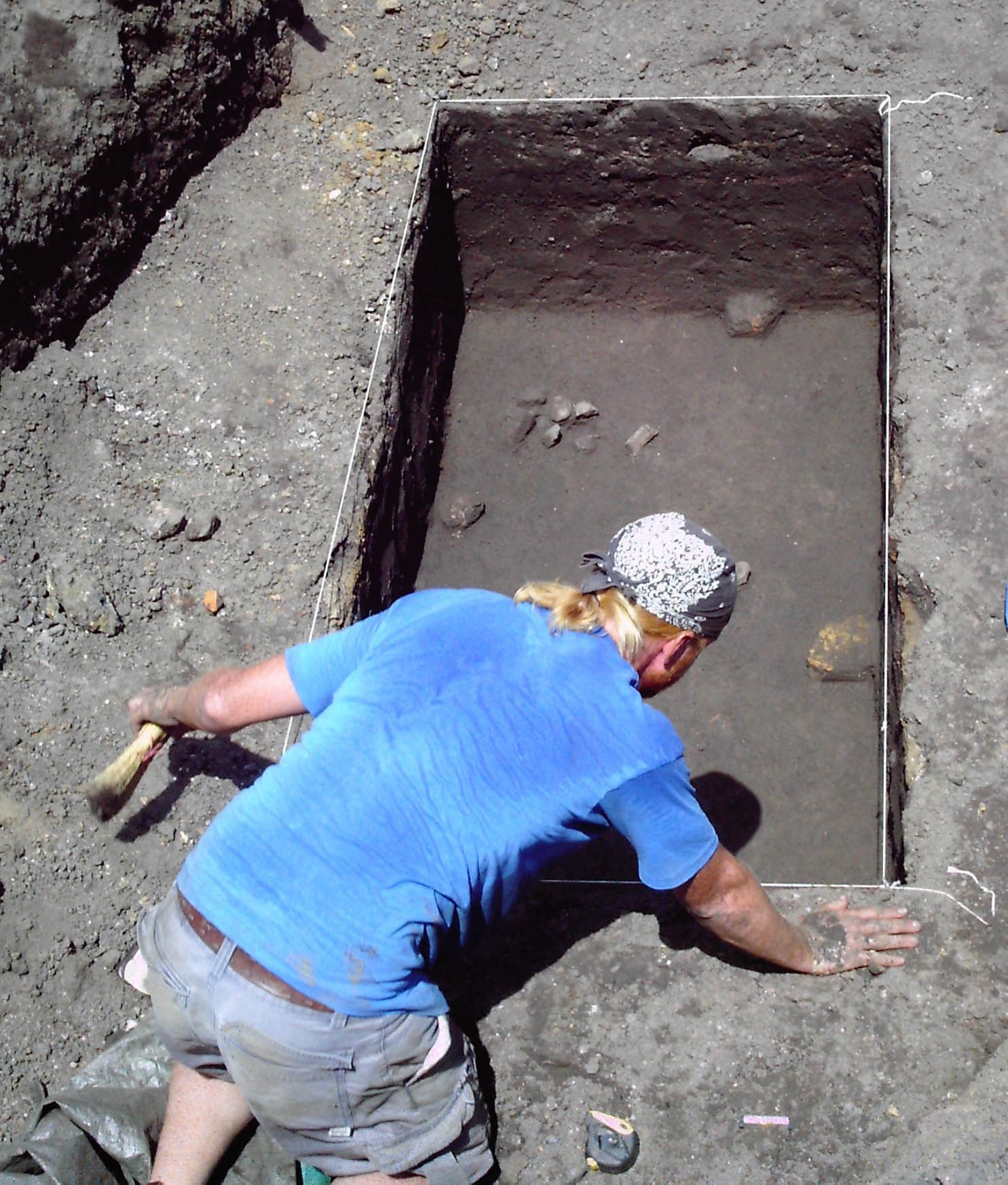
Excavation of the Oneota component of the Birds Run Site in Des Moines

Very large Mississippian centers appeared around AD 1000, with enormous earthen pyramids, palisades, and extreme social hierarchy. The earliest large Mississippian center was Cahokia, east of St. Louis. Cahokia appears to have dominated trade in the upper Mississippi, with satellite or closely aligned settlements as far as Aztalan in Wisconsin. In Iowa, there is little evidence of Mississippian occupation, and the Late Woodland lasts longer in the east than in the west. This is puzzling, given the proximity to Mississippian cultures; it is possible that the nearby presence of the large, hierarchal Mississippian trading network inhibited local development. After the decline of the Cahokia network after AD 1250 the local Late Woodland populations expanded in complexity, developing large nucleated villages and their own trading network, known as Upper Mississippian Oneota. Oneota, named by Charles Keyes for a river in northeast Iowa, was a large cultural manifestation that covered the Upper Midwest at the edge of the Mississippian cultures. Oneota sites are easily identifiable by the globular, shell-tempered pots, which typically have strap handles and incised designs. Pots of this kind were well designed for the cooking of porridge and foods made from the various cultivated foods of the area. Important Oneota sites in Iowa include Kingston, Mckinney, Christenson, Blood Run, Hartley Fort, the Lane Enclosure, three sites in downtown Des Moines, and sites along the Upper Iowa River, including several large earthwork enclosures. After the decline of the Mill Creek and Glenwood cultures in western Iowa, Oneota cultures appeared across the state. It is widely accepted that the Oneota were the ancestors of modern American Indian tribes associated with Iowa, including the Ioway, Ho-Chunk (Winnebago), Otoe, Missouria, and Omaha.

== Protohistoric (1600–1800) ==
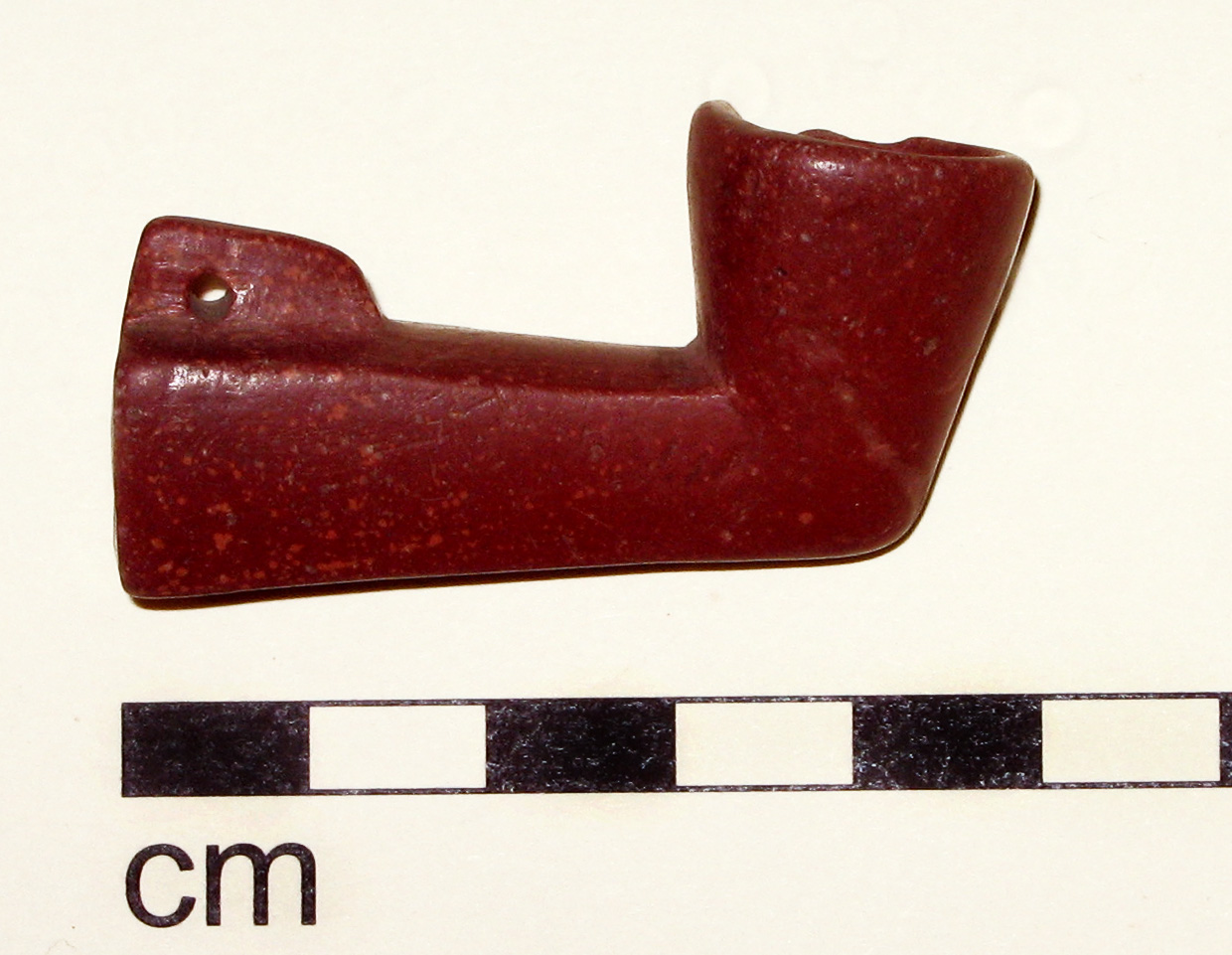
Catlinite pipe, probably Ioway, from the Protohistoric Wanampito Site (13BM16), Bremer County, Iowa.

Protohistoric refers to the period when American Indians were exposed to European trade items and large population shifts occurred because of introduced European diseases and warfare, but there is very little direct written documentation. Explorers such as Marquette and Joliet occasionally documented American Indians along the Mississippi in Iowa, but it was not until the early 19th century that regular written accounts of American Indians in Iowa became common. American Indians in the early Protohistoric period continued many aspects of Oneota culture, but soon almost all indigenous technology disappeared, including ceramics and stone tool production. It was during this period that the Meskwaki (Fox) and Sauk appeared in eastern Iowa, displaced from their homelands in the east. Important protohistoric sites include Milford; Blood Run; Gillett Grove; and Iowaville.

== Historical (1800–present) ==
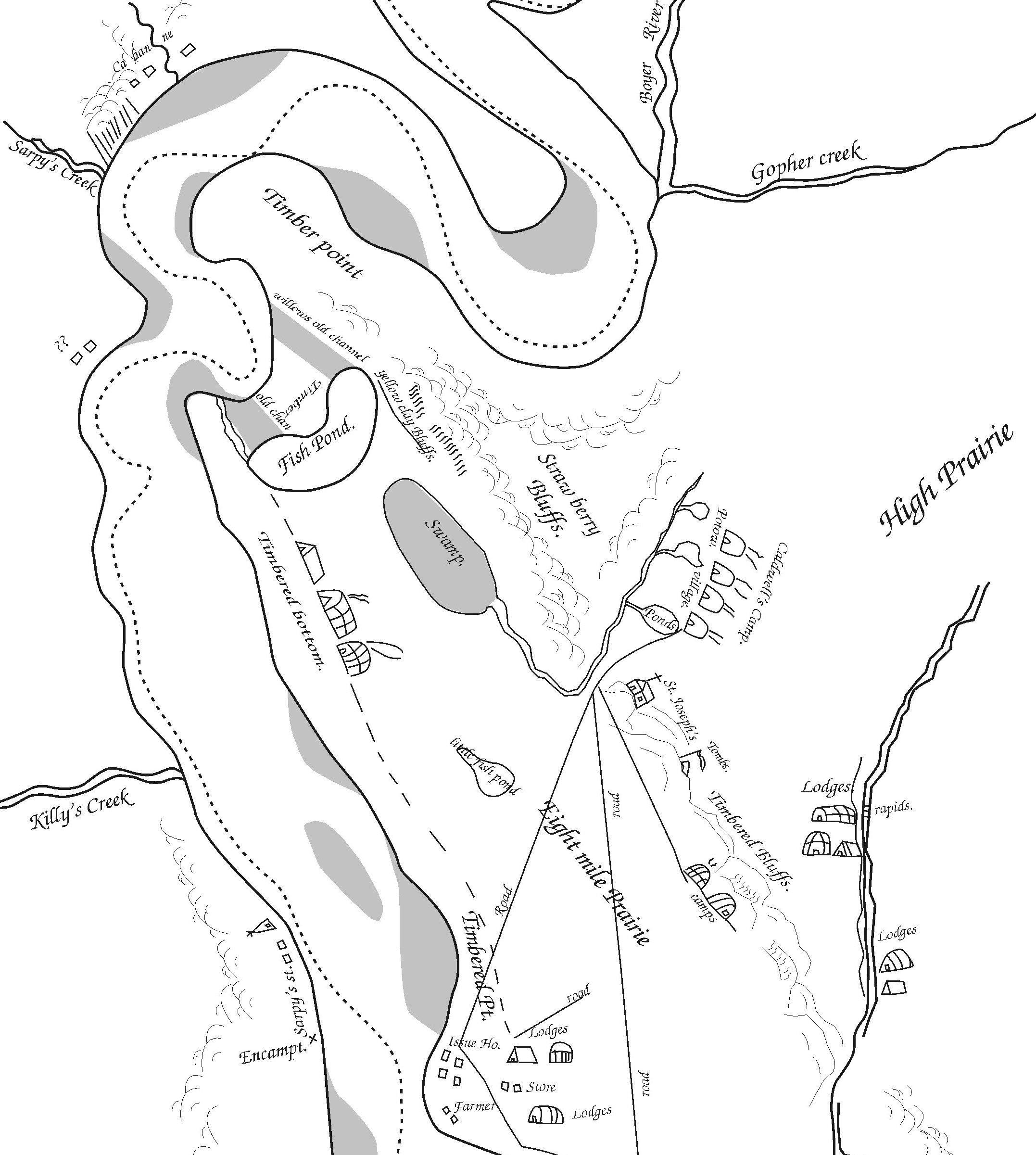
Pierre-Jean De Smet's map of the Council Bluffs, Iowa area (1839), showing Native American villages and early American settlement.

The earliest European forts and settlements were established by traders beginning in the 1680s. Almost none of these ephemeral early historical sites have been located archaeologically. Julien Dubuque’s Mines of Spain settlement and adjacent Meskwaki village occupied in the late 18th century and early 19th century, has been the subject of numerous archaeological surveys. Fort Madison (1808–1813), the first American settlement and the first American fort in Iowa, was partially excavated in 1965. American settlement began in earnest in the 1830s, and the official removal of American Indians from Iowa was completed by 1852. Several of these historical sites have been excavated, including Gilbert’s Trading Post. and Fort Atkinson. Archaeologists have also studied historical American settlements, including excavations at the Plum Grove Historic House, the Buxton African-American community, and the Bowen’s Prairie community.

== See also ==
- Iowa Archaeological Society
- Indians of Iowa
- Geology of Iowa
- History of Iowa
- State Historical Society of Iowa
- Iowa Historic Preservation Alliance
- Effigy Mounds National Monument
