= Margaret Keyes =

Iowa historian and educator

- Born: Margaret Naumann Keyes; March 4, 1918; Mt. Vernon, Iowa
- Died: October 14, 2015 (aged 97); Iowa City, Iowa
- Education: Cornell College, University of Wisconsin-Madison, Florida State University
- Known for: Preservation of the Old Iowa Capitol
- Scientific career
- Fields: Home Economics, heritage conservation
- Workplaces: University of Iowa
- Doctoral advisor: Janet Katherine Smith

Margaret Naumann Keyes (March 4, 1918 – October 14, 2015) was an American academic and heritage preserver. She was a professor of Home Economics at the University of Iowa. She is also a nationally recognized leader in the field of heritage conservation, best known for her work to preserve the Iowa Old Capitol Building.

== Early life and education ==
Margaret Naumann Keyes was born in Mount Vernon, Iowa on 4 March 1918 to Charles R. Keyes and Sarah "Sadie" Naumann Keyes. As a child, Keyes had often accompanied her father on travels to Germany and on his archaeological expeditions, leading to her interest in academics. She attended Cornell College in Mt. Vernon, Iowa and graduated in 1939 with a B.A. in Home Economics. After graduation, Keyes taught at several Iowa high schools and undertook graduate studies at the University of Wisconsin during summer terms, earning a master's degree in 1951. She was appointed to the Home Economics faculty at the State University of Iowa in September, 1951. A decade later, she won the Ellen H. Richards Fellowship from the American Home Economics Association to undertake doctoral studies at Florida State University, earning a Ph.D. in Historic Preservation in 1965.

== Academic career ==
Upon returning to the University of Iowa and Keyes taught a variety of courses including Textile Design, Historic Interiors, and research seminars. In the 1970s and 1980s, Keyes led Iowa's drive to preserve and renovate its historic structures. She served as a board member for the State Historical Society of Iowa, the Terrace Hill (the Iowa governor's mansion) Authority, the Iowa City Urban Renewal Design Review Board, the Victorian Society in America, and the National Trust for Historic Preservation. Keyes's most important work in historic preservation was her 1975 to 1999 direction of the restoration of the Old State Capitol in Iowa City, converting it to a state historical museum. Keyes's commitments as director of Old Capitol, speaking engagements, and service work left her with little time to fulfill her duties as professor in the Home Economics department. She gradually decreased her course load and officially retired as full professor and was granted emeritus status in 1984. She was active as a researcher and active scholar well into her retirement.

== Selected publications ==
Old Capitol: Portrait of an Iowa Landmark by Margaret N. Keyes, 1988

- Keyes, M.N. (1966). Nineteenth Century Home Architecture of Iowa City. University of Iowa Press, Iowa City. 162pp. ISBN 978-0-87745-013-9
- Keyes, M.N. (1988). Old Capitol: Portrait of an Iowa Landmark. University of Iowa Press, Iowa City. 187pp. ISBN 978-0-87745-210-2

== Personal life ==
Keyes and her lifetime companion, Floy Eugenia Whitehead, traveled to a variety of worldwide locations, including Israel, Jamaica, Taiwan, and Europe. For over thirty years, the two lived at a home near the university in Iowa City that was renowned for its gracious hospitality. Eugenia Whitehead who served as the chairperson of the Department of Home Economics at the University of Iowa from 1955 to 1971 died in 1998.

== The Keyes family ==
Margaret's father, Charles Reuben Keyes was born on 5 May 1871 in Mt. Vernon, Iowa to Marsden and Martha Whittington Keyes. He attended Cornell College and married Sarah "Sadie" Naumann in 1902. Charles Keyes attended Harvard University for his Ph.D. in German, and taught German at Cornell College until his retirement in 1941. He also had a lifelong interest in local archeology, was employed by the State Historical Society of Iowa and was known for his expertise in local Native American archaeology and burial mounds. He died in 1951. Sarah Naumann Keyes died in 1963.

Margaret Keyes had one older sister, Catherine Ann Keyes, who was born 25 April 1905, attended Cornell College, the Oberlin Conservatory of Music and Yale University. Catherine Ann Keyes served on the faculty of Oberlin College as a music historian and music librarian in the early 1940s. Catherine married Philip L. Miller (1906 - 1996) who had been a music librarian at the New York Public Library in 1938. She earned her Ph.D. in Music History from Yale University in 1948. Philip and Catherine Keyes Miller served as music librarians at the New York Public Library from October 1945 until their retirement. Catherine also served on the faculty of Columbia University teaching music librarianship beginning in 1946. She died January 1978 in Brooklyn, New York.

Marsden Keyes (Margaret's paternal grandfather) was born 15 Feb 1832 in Northumberland, New York to William W. Keyes and Laura Rice. He married Margaret Purves in Nova Scotia in 1856. After living in Lone Rock, Wisconsin, the couple moved to Mt. Vernon, Iowa, in 1860 and had three children. Margaret Purves Keyes died in 1863. Marsden Keyes then married Martha Whittington in 1866. Marsden Keyes was a carpenter and home builder in Mt. Vernon during a period of large growth for the town, from 1870 to the 1890s. He died in 1902.

Margaret Naumann Keyes was a descendant of Edmund Rice, an English immigrant to Massachusetts Bay Colony, as follows:

- Margaret Naumann Keyes, daughter of
  - Charles Reuben Keyes (1871–1951), son of
  - Marsden Keyes (1832–1902), son of
  - Laura Rice (1801–1842), daughter of
    - Noah Rice (1760–1834), son of
    - Phineas Rice (1724–1777), son of
      - Perez Rice (1698–1782), son of
      - Thomas Rice (1654–1747), son of
      - Thomas Rice (1626–1681), son of
        - Edmund Rice (1594–1663)
