= Charles R. Keyes =

Iowa archaeologist

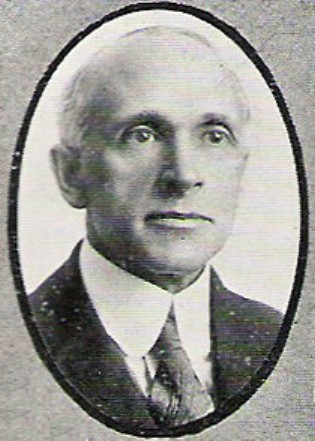
- 1920 Yearbook Photo
- Born: Charles Reuben Keyes; May 5, 1871; Mount Vernon, Iowa, U.S.
- Died: July 23, 1951 (aged 80); Mount Vernon, Iowa, United States
- Education: Cornell College, Harvard University
- Known for: first descriptions of the Mississippian culture
- Spouse: Sarah Mary Nauman
- Children: Catherine Keyes, Margaret Naumann Keyes
- Scientific career
- Fields: Archaeology
- Workplaces: University of California, Berkeley, Cornell College

Charles Reuben Keyes (May 5, 1871 – July 23, 1951) was a pioneering American archaeologist and linguist based in Iowa, known as the founder of modern Iowa archaeology. He is, with Ellison Orr (1857-1951), considered a key person to gaining protection for the Effigy Mounds National Monument, established by Congress in 1949 to protect hundreds of prehistoric earthworks built by indigenous Native American cultures.

Keyes is known as the first American researcher to describe the Mississippian culture, the last great moundbuilding culture. Many of its major earthworks had been drawn and recorded in the late 19th century by researchers for the Smithsonian Institution, but he also used evidence from artifacts to describe its culture. In support of regional research, Keyes organized the Iowa Archaeological Survey in 1922 and encouraged founding in 1951 of the Iowa Archeological Society.

== Early life and education ==
Charles Reuben Keyes was born on 5 May 1871 in Mount Vernon, Iowa to Marsden and Martha Keyes. Among his ancestors was Edmund Rice, an English immigrant to Massachusetts Bay Colony.

Keyes attended Cornell College in Mount Vernon, Iowa. He attended Harvard University for his Ph.D. in German.

== Career ==
Keyes returned to Iowa to teach German at Cornell College in Mount Vernon. He was a professor there for his entire career. He retired in 1941.

While his early work dealt with linguistics, by the 1920s Keyes focused his research almost exclusively on sites and artifacts in Iowa. He is considered the founder of Iowa archeology.

Keyes organized the Iowa Archaeological Survey in 1922 and led it with Ellison Orr until their deaths in 1951. They recorded thousands of sites and conducted hundreds of excavations. Together they helped create the modern theoretical and temporal framework for prehistoric Midwestern archaeology. Keyes was among the first scholars to describe what is now known as the Mississippian culture, which reached its peak after 1000CE. The people of this culture had centers throughout the Mississippi Valley and its tributaries, including the Ohio, from the upper Midwest to the Southeast. Its major chiefdom was at Cahokia, in present-day Illinois. In the late 19th century, researchers for the Smithsonian Institution had recorded mounds at Cahokia and elsewhere in the Midwest.

Keyes and Orr surveyed a territory of extensive prehistoric earthwork mounds in northeastern Iowa. They established its significance and gained establishment by Congress in 1949 of the Effigy Mounds National Monument to protect these historic and cultural resources. Orr donated "most of his writings and much of his American Indian artifact collection to the national monument."

In 1951 Keyes proposed the Iowa Archeological Society, which colleagues founded that year.

== Marriage and family ==
After getting established, Keyes married Sarah Mary "Sadie" Naumann in 1902. They had two daughters, Catherine Ann, a librarian at the New York City Public Library, and Margaret Naumann Keyes. Margaret became a professor of Home Economics at the University of Iowa, and recognized as a national leader in the field of historic preservation. Sadie Keyes died in 1963.

== Selected works by Keyes ==
- 1902 "Some Phrases of Alliteration and Rime in Modern English and German." Proceedings of the American Philological Association XXXIII.
- 1903 "The Omission of the Auxiliary Verb in German." Proceedings of the American Philological Association XXXIV.
- 1920 "Some Materials for the Study of Iowa Archaeology." Iowa Journal of History and Politics 18(3):357–370.
- 1925 "Progress of the Archaeological Survey of Iowa. Iowa Journal of History and Politics 18(3):339–352.
- 1927 "Prehistoric Man in Iowa. Palimpsest 8(6):185–229.
- 1928 "The Hill-Lewis Archeological Survey. Minnesota History 9:96–108.
- 1928 "Prehistoric Red Men." Palimpsest 9(2):33–37.
- 1928 "Reports Archaeological Field Work in North America in 1927: Iowa." American Anthropologist 30:507–508.
- 1931 "Grooved Axes of the Keokuk Type." The Wisconsin Archeologist 10(4):129–131.
- 1933 "Shall Iowa Have National Monuments?" Iowa Journal of History and Politics 31(1):31–46.
- 1934 "Antiquities of the Upper Iowa," Palimpsest 15(10):321–354.
- 1935 "Field Work in North America during 1934: Iowa." American Antiquity 1:65-66.
- 1941 "An Outline of Iowa Archaeology. Iowa Academy of Science 48:91–98.
- 1944 "Antiquities." The Proceedings of the Iowa Academy of Sciences 51:73–74.
- 1945 Ellison Orr: Naturalist, Archaeologist, Citizen. Iowa Bird Life 15(2):25–28.
- 1951 Ellison Orr: 1857-1951. The Proceedings of the Iowa Academy of Sciences 58:58–59.
- 1951 Prehistoric Indians of Iowa. Palimpsest 32(8):281–343.

== Bibliography ==
- Ennis, J. Harold (1951) "Charles Reuben Keyes," Journal of the Iowa Archeological Society (1):14–16
- Green, William (1992) Charles Reuben Keyes and the History of Iowa Archaeology, Journal of the Iowa Academy of Science (99):80–85
- Jackson, Marilyn (1984) "Charles Reuben Keyes: Groundbreaker in Iowa Archaeology," The Iowan 33:32–54.
- Knauth, Otto (1982) "The Keyes Collection: A Legacy of Indian Artifacts," Des Moines Register May 9.
- Perry, Michael J. (2009)"Keyes, Charles Reuben," In The Biographical Dictionary of Iowa. University of Iowa Press.
- Tandarich, John P. and Loren N. Horton (1976) "A Memorial Bibliography of Charles R. Keyes and Ellison J. Orr," Journal of the Iowa Archeological Society (23):45–144.
- Tiffany, Joseph A. "Curating the Charles R. Keyes Archaeological Collection", Museum Anthropology, April 1986, DOI: 10.1525/mua.1986.10.2.15
