= Matthew Edel Blacksmith Shop and House =

Historic house in Iowa, United States

- U.S. National Register of Historic Places
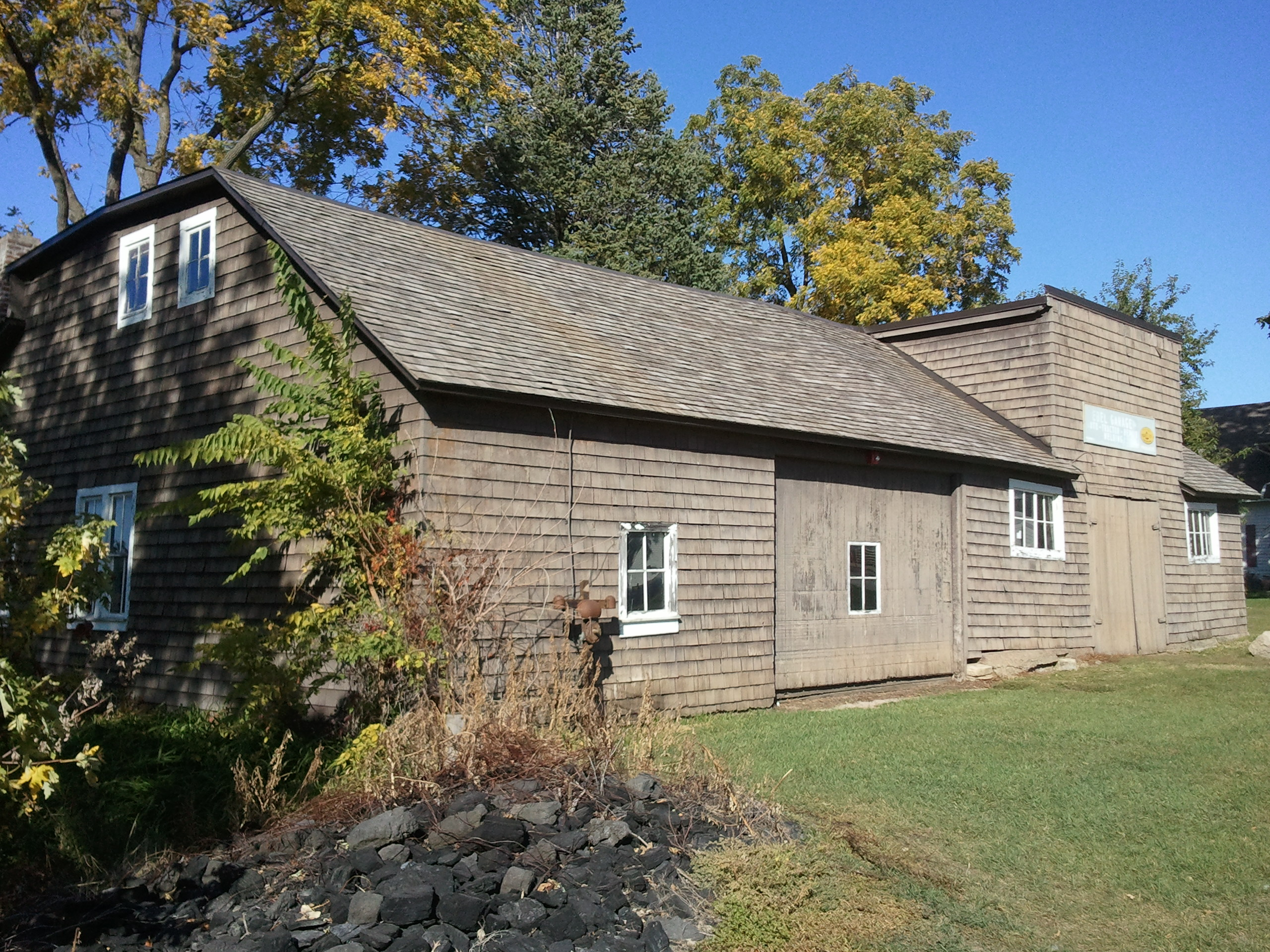
- Blacksmith Shop

- Location within Iowa Location within the United States
- Location: 1st St. and 3rd Ave. Haverhill, Iowa
- Coordinates: 41°56′38″N 92°57′41″W
- Built: c. 1880 (shop) c. 1890 (house)
- Built by: Matthew Edel
- Architectural style: Late Victorian
- NRHP reference No.: 83000391
- Added to NRHP: March 11, 1983

The Matthew Edel Blacksmith Shop and House are historic buildings located in Haverhill, Iowa, United States. The complex includes the blacksmith shop from the early 1880s, a garage addition from 1915, a house from the early 1890s, and a summer kitchen (date uncertain). It is a state historic site.

== History ==
A native of Stuttgart, Germany, Edel emigrated with his family to the United States in 1873, settling in Effingham, Illinois. While living there, he invented and patented a wire-binder grain harvester. He received financial backing from his neighbors and others in town, however the Deering Harvester Company successfully marketed a similar machine about the same time and his machine failed. He moved to Iowa, settling near Iowa City where he met Maria Hoffman. Edel moved to Haverhill in 1883, and he opened a blacksmith shop. He married Maria the same year, and they lived on the second floor above the shop. Together they raised eight children. As the business prospered, Edel expanded the shop and in the early 1890s built the two-story Late Victorian frame house. The summer kitchen may have been on the property when Edel bought it, but it cannot be determined when it was built. It is from the same era as the shop and the house.

In addition to the normal blacksmith tasks, Edel received patents on several of his inventions. In addition to the wire grain-binder, he also received patents for the Perfection De-Horning Clipper (1895), fence stretcher (1899), Perfection Wedge Cutter (1901), a type of nut pliers (date unknown), and Edel's Garden Weeding and Cultivating Hoe (1924). Based on the testimonials on his brochures, he sold his products to customers in the Midwest and Northeast. He also made metal grave markers similar to those found in Germany. Outside of the German-Russian immigrants of North Dakota, this type of grave marker is rare in the United States.

While Edel operated the blacksmith shop into the late 1930s, he realized he needed to adapt in order to stay in business. He expanded the shop in 1915 to include automobile repairs. His son Louis went Des Moines to study auto repair, and joined his father in business. Edel died in 1940. Louis moved to Waterloo, Iowa in 1952, but continued to maintain his father's blacksmith shop basically as he had left it. He returned to Haverhill in 1964, and re-opened the automobile repair shop on a part-time basis. Louis auctioned off his tools in April 1978, and moved to Arizona where he died the following month. The complex was listed on the National Register of Historic Places in 1983, and Louis Edel's heirs donated it to the State Historical Society of Iowa in 1986, which operates it as a historic site.
