= State Historical Society of Iowa =

Historic organization

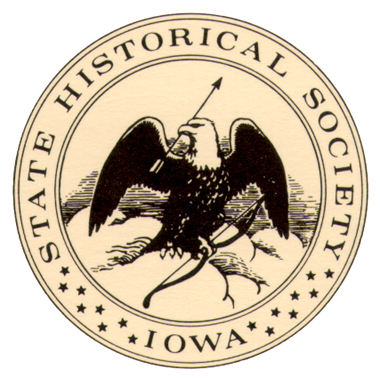
Original Seal.

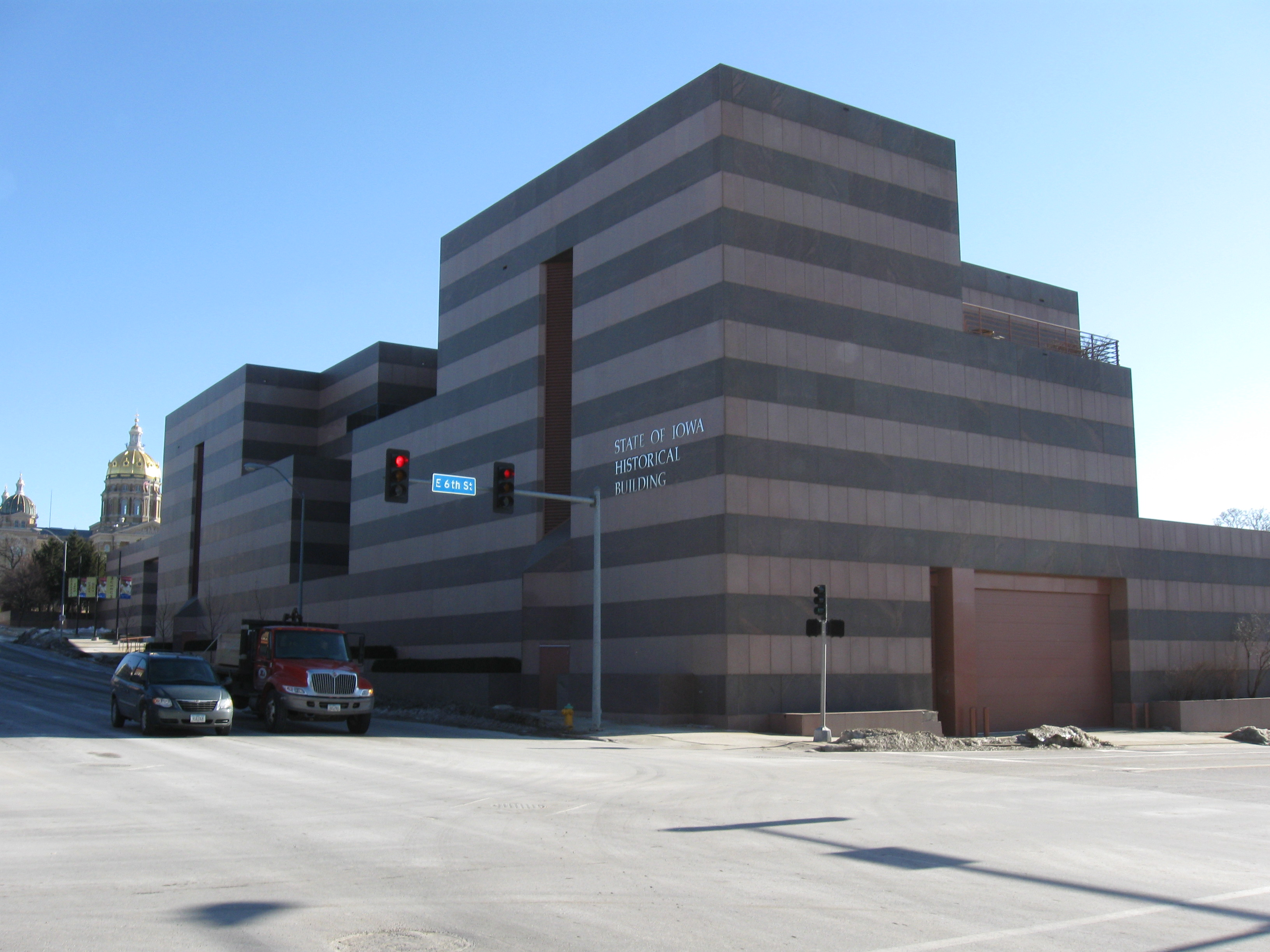
State Historical Society Building, Des Moines.

The State Historical Society of Iowa (SHSI), a division of the Iowa Department of Administrative Affairs, serves as the official historical repository for the State of Iowa and also provides grants, public education, and outreach about Iowa history and archaeology. The SHSI maintains a museum, library, archives, and research center in Des Moines and formerly maintained a research library in Iowa City, as well as several historic sites in Iowa. It was founded in 1857 in Iowa City, where it was first affiliated with the University of Iowa. As the organization grew in size and collections, it became a separate state agency headquartered near the Iowa Capitol in Des Moines. Since March 2024, the Administrator of the State Historical Society of Iowa has been Valerie Van Kooten.

== Publications ==
The SHSI currently publishes The Annals of Iowa, edited by Dr. Andrew Klumpp. In the past it published the Iowa Heritage Illustrated, Goldfinch, the Iowa Journal of History and Politics, and the Iowa Historical Record. It also currently produces an e-newsletter, the Iowa Historian.

== State and federal regulation ==
The SHSI is part of the Iowa Department of Cultural affairs, both organizations coordinate the State Historic Preservation Office of Iowa, Iowa's designated SHPO, which reviews state and federally mandated laws and regulations relating to historic and archaeological work.

== State Historical Museum of Iowa ==
Located in Des Moines, Iowa, the State Historical Museum of Iowa is the society's main museum. Exhibits show Iowa's growth and development and its citizens.

== SHSI historic sites ==
- Abbie Gardner Sharp Cabin in Arnolds Park, Iowa
- American Gothic House in Eldon, Iowa
- Blood Run Site in Lyon County, Iowa
- Matthew Edel Blacksmith Shop in Haverhill, Iowa
- Montauk Historic Governor's Home in Clermont, Iowa
- Plum Grove Historic House in Iowa City
- Toolesboro Mound Group in Louisa County, Iowa
- Western Historic Trails Center in Council Bluffs, Iowa

== See also ==
- History of Iowa
- Iowa archaeology
- National Register of Historic Places listings in Iowa
- List of historical societies in Iowa
- List of National Historic Landmarks in Iowa
- Iowa Archeological Society
