= Haverhill, Iowa =

- City
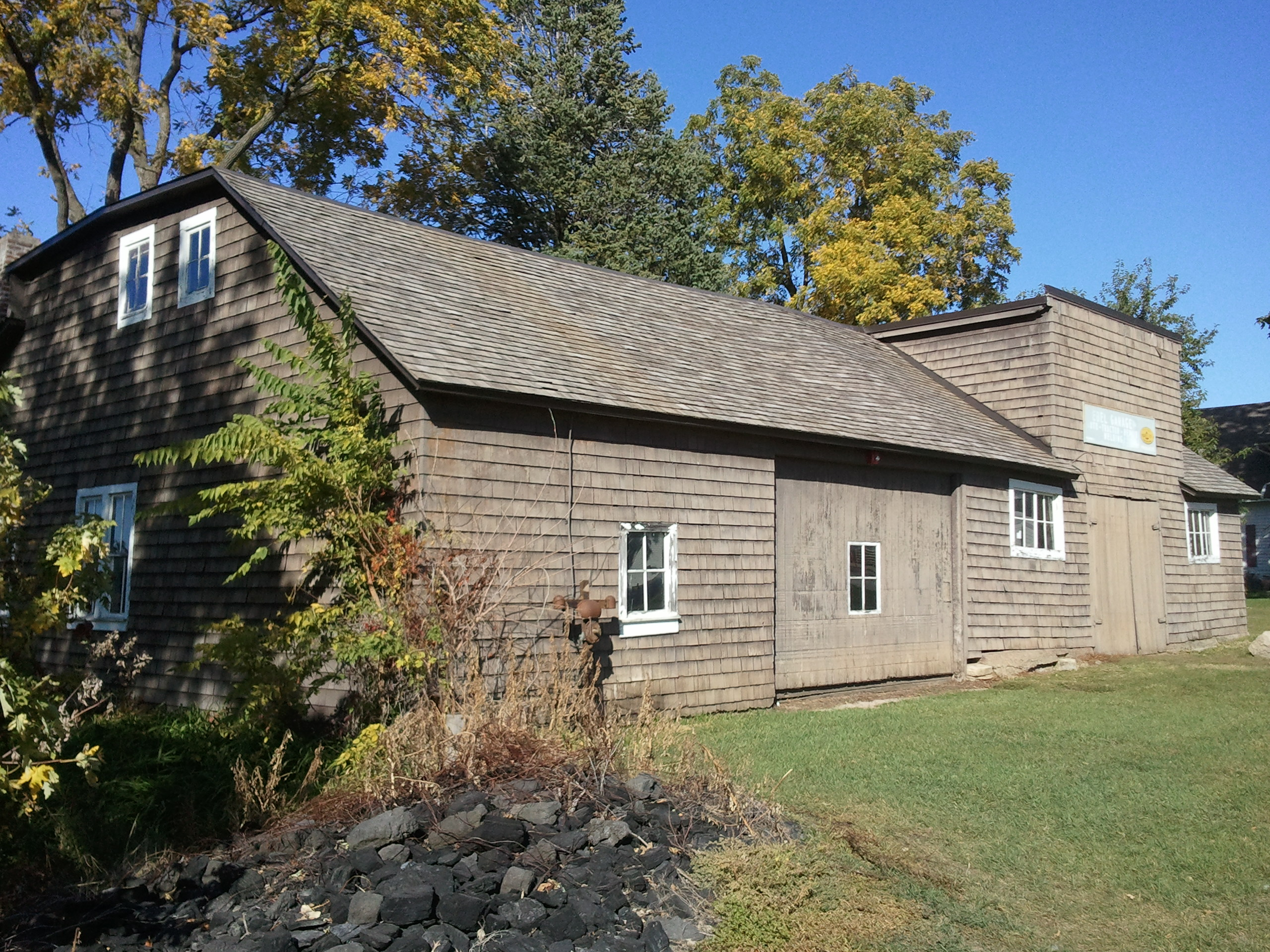
- Matthew Edel blacksmith shop and house

- Location of Haverhill, Iowa
- Coordinates: 41°56′39″N 92°57′39″W
- Country: United States
- State: Iowa
- County: Marshall

Area
  - Total: 0.14 sq mi (0.36 km^{2})
  - Land: 0.14 sq mi (0.36 km^{2})
  - Water: 0 sq mi (0.00 km^{2})
- Elevation: 1,017 ft (310 m)

Population (2020)
  - Total: 165
  - Density: 1,187.5/sq mi (458.48/km^{2})
- Time zone: UTC-6 (Central (CST))
  - Summer (DST): UTC-5 (CDT)
- ZIP code: 50120
- Area code: 641
- FIPS code: 19-35220
- GNIS feature ID: 2394328
- Website: www.cityofhaverhillia.com

Haverhill is a city in Marshall County, Iowa, United States. The population was 165 at the time of the 2020 census.

Sites in Haverhill include the Immaculate Conception oratory, the Matthew Edel Blacksmith Shop and House, and the Mid-Iowa Co-Op, which owns the grain elevators on the south end of the city. A series of wind turbines owned by Mid-American Energy stretch from Haverhill to the nearby town of Laurel.

== History ==
The St. Joseph's parochial school and the Immaculate Conception Church, established in the 1870s pre-date Haverhill's official 1882 platting by the Chicago, Milwaukee and St. Paul Railway (also known as the Milwaukee Road). The railroad carried both freight and passengers, with passenger service traveling east and west each stopping in Haverhill three times daily. The community mostly stored grain in elevators, while hosting several small industries and town services including a lumber company, blacksmith shop, bank, general store, grocer, and schools.

Throughout the 20th century, these businesses and services mostly closed. Rail traffic fell, first losing passenger rail service before freight traffic ceased in 1980. Prior to this, the German Savings Bank (established in 1908) shuttered in the early 1920s. By the mid-20th century, the public school had merged into the Marshalltown Community School District, with the St. Joseph's Catholic school closing in 1968.

The town was only officially incorporated in 1968, when residents chose to elect a city government, establishing municipal services, including a fire department. Just before the city's official incorporation, the Haverhill Development Corporation expanded streets and available housing from 3rd Avenue to 4th Avenue. The town's roads were then paved in the 1980s, with sewer services later overhauled in the 1990s and early 2000s.

== Geography ==
According to the United States Census Bureau, the city has a total area of 0.13 square miles (0.34 km^{2}), all land.

== Demographics ==
=== 2020 census ===
As of the census of 2020, there were 165 people, 67 households, and 51 families residing in the city. The population density was 1,187.5 inhabitants per square mile (458.5/km^{2}). There were 67 housing units at an average density of 482.2 per square mile (186.2/km^{2}). The racial makeup of the city was 97.0% White, 0.0% Black or African American, 0.0% Native American, 0.0% Asian, 0.0% Pacific Islander, 0.6% from other races and 2.4% from two or more races. Hispanic or Latino persons of any race comprised 1.2% of the population.

Of the 67 households, 34.3% of which had children under the age of 18 living with them, 49.3% were married couples living together, 17.9% were cohabitating couples, 14.9% had a female householder with no spouse or partner present and 17.9% had a male householder with no spouse or partner present. 23.9% of all households were non-families. 14.9% of all households were made up of individuals, 1.5% had someone living alone who was 65 years old or older.

The median age in the city was 37.5 years. 29.7% of the residents were under the age of 20; 1.2% were between the ages of 20 and 24; 31.5% were from 25 and 44; 26.7% were from 45 and 64; and 10.9% were 65 years of age or older. The gender makeup of the city was 52.7% male and 47.3% female.

=== 2010 census ===
Historical populations
Year	Pop.	±%
1970	160	—
1980	173	+8.1%
1990	144	−16.8%
2000	170	+18.1%
2010	173	+1.8%
2020	165	−4.6%
Source:"U.S. Census website". United States Census Bureau.Iowa Data Center"Census of Population and Housing". Census.gov. Source: U.S. Decennial Census

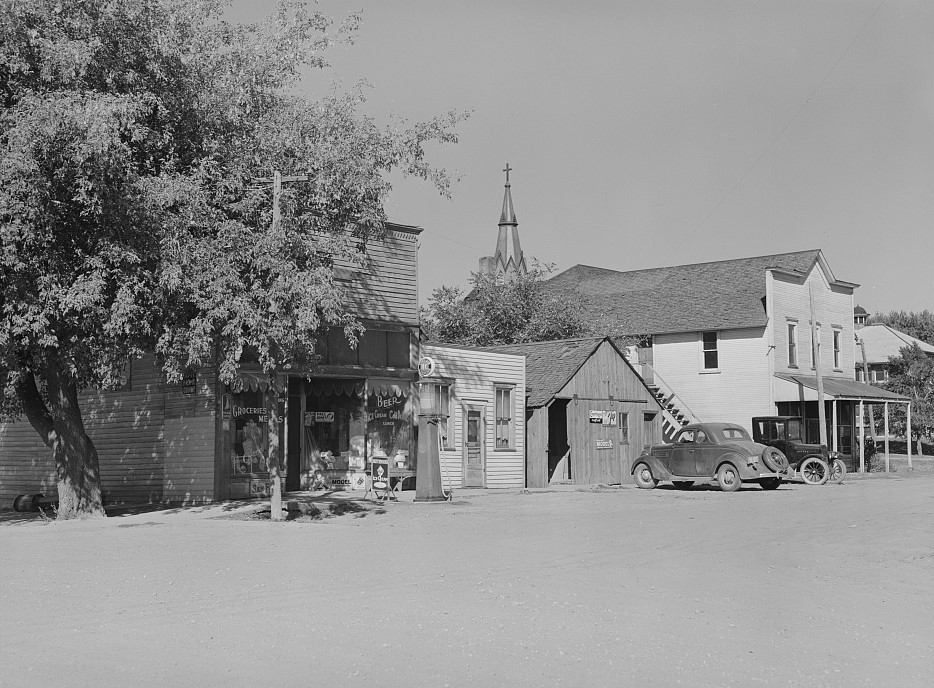
A street in Haverhill, 1939

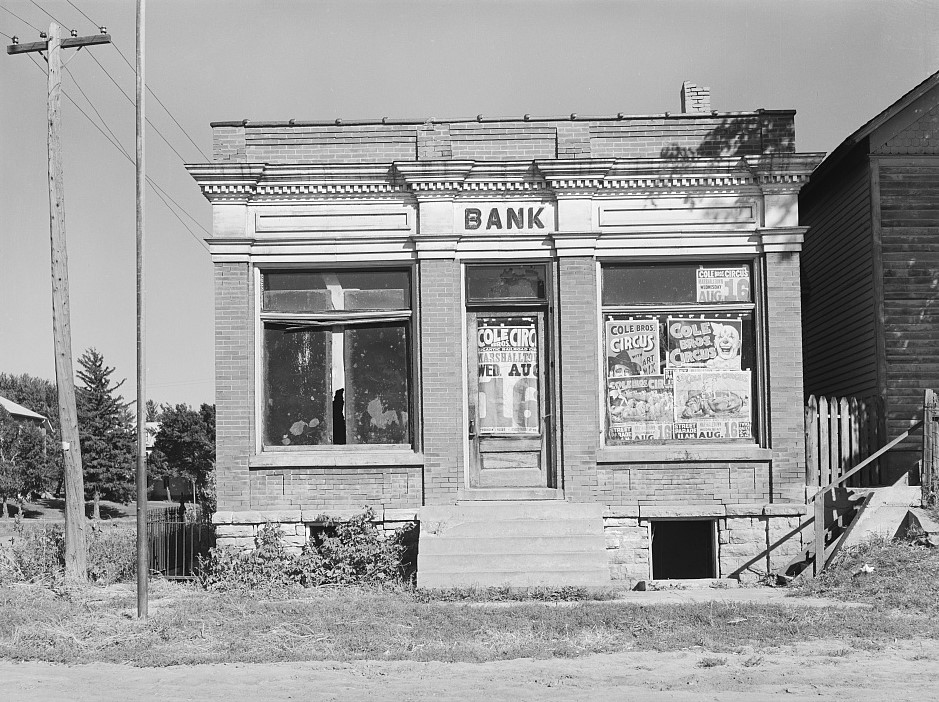
A closed bank in Haverhill, 1939

As of the census of 2010, there were 173 people, 64 households, and 51 families living in the city. The population density was 1,330.8 inhabitants per square mile (513.8/km^{2}). There were 68 housing units at an average density of 523.1 per square mile (202.0/km^{2}). The racial makeup of the city was 99.4% White and 0.6% from two or more races.

There were 64 households, of which 37.5% had children under the age of 18 living with them, 65.6% were married couples living together, 9.4% had a female householder with no husband present, 4.7% had a male householder with no wife present, and 20.3% were non-families. 15.6% of all households were made up of individuals, and 4.7% had someone living alone who was 65 years of age or older. The average household size was 2.70 and the average family size was 3.04.

The median age in the city was 37.2 years. 26% of residents were under the age of 18; 8.1% were between the ages of 18 and 24; 24.8% were from 25 to 44; 30% were from 45 to 64; and 11% were 65 years of age or older. The gender makeup of the city was 53.2% male and 46.8% female.

=== 2000 census ===
As of the census of 2000, there were 170 people, 62 households, and 45 families living in the city. The population density was 1,304.0 inhabitants per square mile (503.5/km^{2}). There were 66 housing units at an average density of 506.2 per square mile (195.4/km^{2}). The racial makeup of the city was 98.24% White, 0.59% Asian, 1.18% from other races. Hispanic or Latino of any race were 1.76% of the population.

There were 62 households, out of which 38.7% had children under the age of 18 living with them, 64.5% were married couples living together, 4.8% had a female householder with no husband present, and 27.4% were non-families. 22.6% of all households were made up of individuals, and 12.9% had someone living alone who was 65 years of age or older. The average household size was 2.74 and the average family size was 3.24.

In the city, the population was spread out, with 31.2% under the age of 18, 5.9% from 18 to 24, 32.9% from 25 to 44, 18.2% from 45 to 64, and 11.8% who were 65 years of age or older. The median age was 35 years. For every 100 females, there were 107.3 males. For every 100 females age 18 and over, there were 95.0 males.

The median income for a household in the city was $45,417, and the median income for a family was $48,250. Males had a median income of $33,750 versus $19,688 for females. The per capita income for the city was $18,702. None of the population or families were below the poverty line.

== Arts and culture ==
Matthew Edel Blacksmith Shop in Haverhill, owned by the State Historical Society of Iowa, holds tours during the summer. The town also has an oratory called Immaculate Conception, whose last regular worship services ended in 2007. Previously a grocery store and tavern, the Haverhill Social Club is today a bar and restaurant where locals frequently gather. At the center of Haverhill is a memorial park.

Residents hold an annual festival called Haverhill Days that celebrate the history of Haverhill, and includes tours of the Matthew Edel Blacksmith Shop.

== Government ==
Haverhill's residents elect their mayor and five city councilors in odd-numbered years, all of whom serve four-year terms.

== Education ==
Haverhill is served by the Marshalltown Community School District and has been part of the district since voting to join in 1966, following the closing of Haverhill's independent schools.
