= Edgewater Park Site =

Late Archaic period Indian archaeological site in Iowa

Coordinates: 41.682°N 91.557°W

The Edgewater Park Site is a 3,800-year-old Late Archaic campsite situated along the Iowa River in Coralville, Iowa, United States. Plant remains recovered from the site suggest the inhabitants were in the earliest stages of adapting domesticated plants.

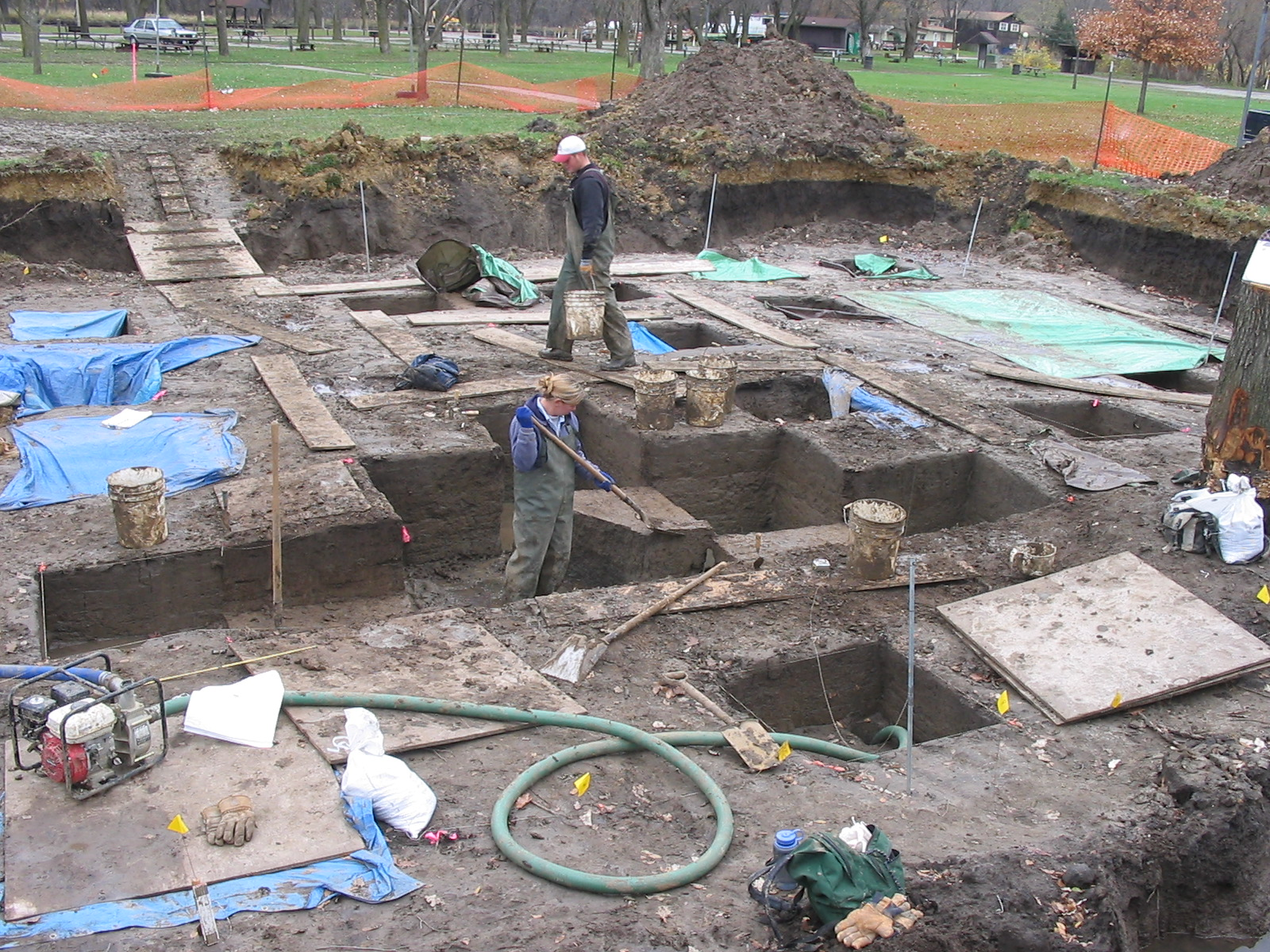
Excavations at the Late Archaic Edgewater Park Site in Coralville

Excavations revealed a small encampment of two hearths and areas for faunal and stone tool production. Other features identified include a discard area and a deep feature of unknown function. Lithic analysis reveals that the site occupants probably recently traveled along the Iowa River from the north center of the state and were engaged in late-stage tool manufacture and maintenance. Floral analysis indicates the site occupation occurred during the warm half of the year and that the occupants utilized little barley, a non-local plant which was later cultivated, and barnyard grass, a local plant probably also later cultivated. This site is interpreted as a short-term, late warm-season occupation of people migrating down the Iowa River, possibly towards winter encampments in what is now the southeast part of the state.

== See also ==
- Iowa archaeology
