= Fish Farm Mounds State Preserve =

- Fish Farm Mound Group
- U.S. National Register of Historic Places
- The state preserve in 2020

- Location within Iowa Location within the United States
- Nearest city: New Albin, Iowa
- Coordinates: 43°27′20″N 91°16′45″W
- MPS: Prehistoric Mounds of the Quad-State Region of the Upper Mississippi River Valley MPS
- NRHP reference No.: 88001131
- Added to NRHP: July 25, 1988

Fish Farm Mounds State Preserve is a 3-acre (12,000 m^{2}) archaeological mound group containing Native American burials in the U.S. state of Iowa. It is located within the larger Fish Farms Mounds Wildlife area, a state owned hunting area a few miles south of New Albin, just inland from the Upper Mississippi River in Allamakee County.

== History ==
This prehistoric cemetery was acquired by the state in 1935 as a donation from the Fish family. It became an archaeological state preserve in 1968. It was listed on the National Register of Historic Places in 1988.

It is located in the Driftless Area of Iowa, a region which escaped being glaciated during the last ice age, near the mouth of the Upper Iowa River.

== See also ==
- List of Registered Historic Places in Iowa
- Upper Mississippi River National Wildlife and Fish Refuge
- Iowa archaeology
