= Palace Site =

Archaeological site located in Des Moines, Iowa

The Palace Site is a ca. 7,000-year-old archeological site in Des Moines, Iowa with evidence for some of the oldest houses west of the Mississippi valley and the oldest human burial in Iowa. Since 2011, the site has yielded 6,000 or more artifacts, which included human skeletons.

== Details ==
A short documentary of the excavation is available on YouTube. When a sewage plant was being built in the area, artifacts were found. The total of artifacts at Palace Site reached over 6,000 by 2011.

The site was discovered during construction of a new wastewater treatment facility. Anytime federally permitted or funded construction is occurring, archaeologists are called to perform an evaluation of potential archaeological sites in the area.

According to Bill Whittaker, a co-director of the dig “It became clear very quickly that the site was something spectacular — something none of us had seen before or probably will ever again, as well-preserved house deposits of this age are extremely rare west of the Mississippi River Valley,”
