= Climate of Iowa =

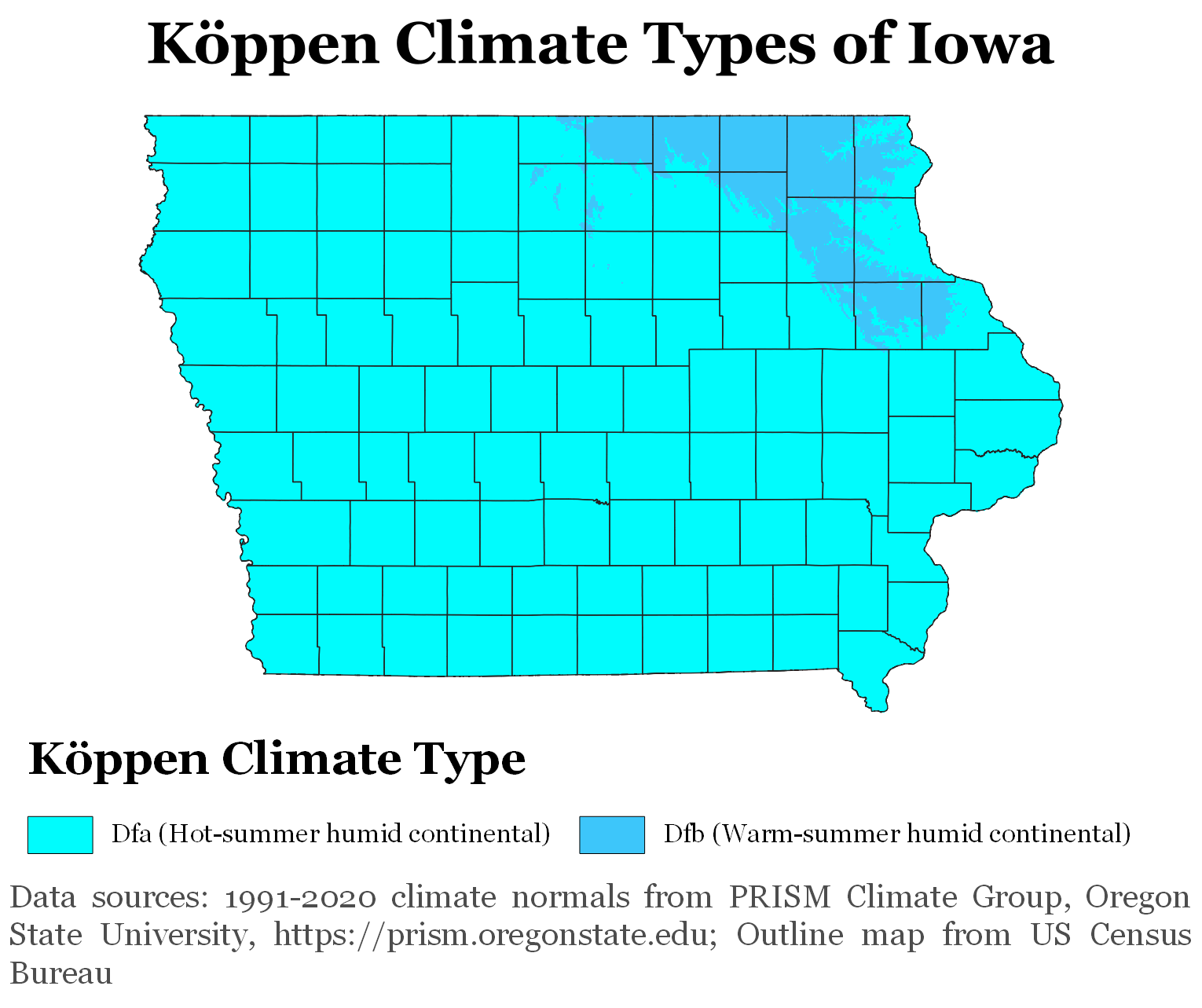
Köppen climate types of Iowa, using 1991-2020 climate normals

The climate of Iowa is generally the same across the state. It has a humid continental climate according to the Köppen climate classification. Iowa has a hot summer and cold winters, while the very northeastern part has a warm summer and a cold winter.

Iowa is prone to multiple types of natural disasters, including snowstorms, floods, and tornadoes.

== Temperature ==
Iowa has mostly hot summers and cold winters. The capital city of Des Moines has an average yearly temperature of 50.9 °F (10.5 °C). The southern most city in Iowa, Keokuk, has an average yearly temperature of 52.1 °F (11.17 °C). Northern cities in Iowa are generally colder. Mason City has an average yearly temperature of 45.6 °F (7.5 °C). On average, Iowa experiences 6 days with a heat index of more than 95 °F (35 °C).

Monthly normal high and low temperatures for various Iowa cities (°F)
City	Jan	Feb	Mar	Apr	May	Jun	Jul	Aug	Sep	Oct	Nov	Dec
Davenport	30/13	36/19	48/29	61/41	72/52	81/63	85/68	83/66	76/57	65/45	48/32	35/20
Des Moines	31/14	36/19	49/30	62/41	72/52	82/62	86/67	84/65	76/55	63/43	48/31	34/18
Keokuk	34/17	39/21	50/30	63/42	73/52	83/62	87/67	85/65	78/56	66/44	51/33	33/21
Mason City	24/6	29/12	41/23	57/35	69/46	79/57	82/61	80/58	73/49	60/37	43/25	28/11
Sioux City	31/10	35/15	47/26	62/37	73/49	82/59	86/63	83/63	76/51	63/38	46/25	32/13

== Precipitation ==
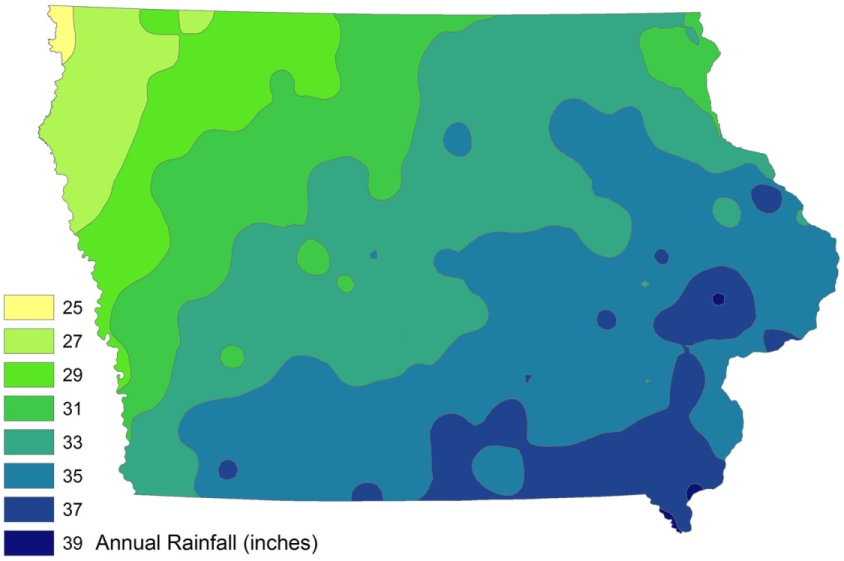
Iowa annual rainfall in 2009

=== Rain ===
The position of the jet stream and ocean-atmospheric oscillations greatly affect the wet and dry cycles of Iowa as it can alter temperature and precipitation across the Upper Midwest. Most of the precipitation that falls in Iowa is rain associated with storms during between April through September. During the summer, rainfall can exceed 13 inches (33 cm), and in northern Iowa it can exceed 14 inches (36 cm).

=== Snow ===
Annual average snowfall ranges from 18–42 inches (45.72–106.68 cm) across the state. The first inch of snowfall usually occurs between November 10 – 17. The most snow recorded in a single winter season was in Allerton, with around 100 inches (250 cm) of snowfall from December 2009 – February 2010. The most snowfall in a single day was on April 20, 1918 in Lenox, with 24 inches (61 cm) of recorded snowfall.

=== Drought ===
Drought is somewhat common in Iowa, happening around every 12 years. January is the driest month of the year for Iowa. Between 1640 and 1982, extreme drought conditions (Note: Classified as having a Palmer drought index of less than -3.20) occurred about 28 times. The longest interval of drought happened in 1664–1668.

== Natural Disasters ==
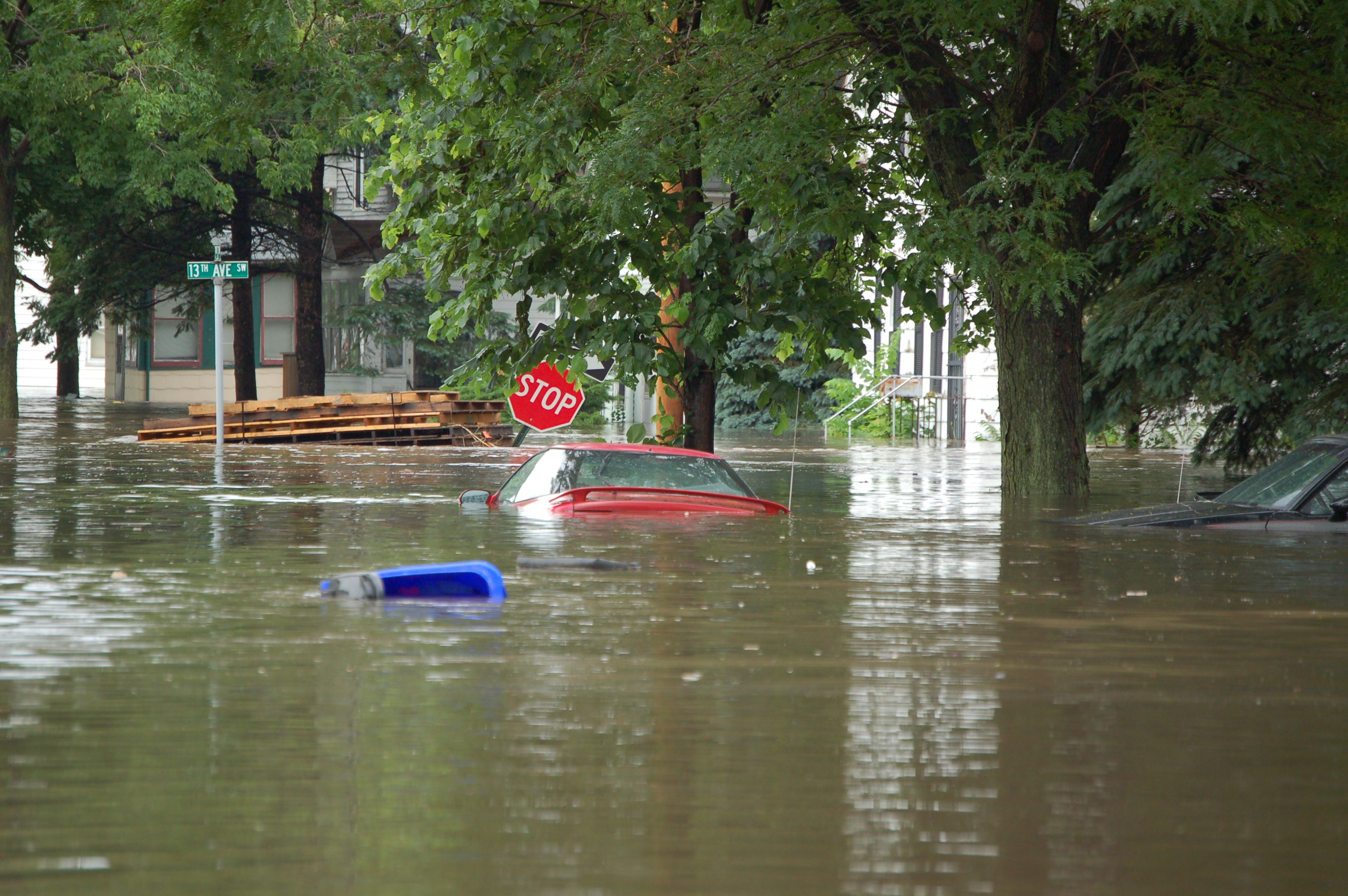
Flooding in Cedar Rapids during the Iowa flood of 2008

Iowa experiences multiple types of natural disasters, with snowstorms and tornadoes being the most common. A few instances of earthquakes, sinkholes, and mine collapses have also occurred.

=== Floods ===
(E)F5 tornadoes recorded in Iowa

Iowa has experienced multiple devastating floods mainly off the Mississippi and Missouri rivers. The Great Flood of 1993 has been recognized as one of the most devastating disasters in Iowa history. 17 people died, and $2.7 billion in damages occurred around the entire state, with all 99 counties of Iowa being declared a federal disaster area. The 2008 flood is also recognized as a very intense flood and one of the worst in the modern history of Iowa. One person died, and the damage was estimated at $10 billion across 85 of Iowa's counties. The majority of Iowa's floods happen due to an increase of rain wetting the soil. When soil gets wet, it becomes harder for it to absorb more moisture, so an increase of rainwater runs into rivers.

=== Tornadoes ===
Recorded tornadoes in Iowa started in the mid 1800s, with the first devastating tornado in Iowa being the 1860 Camanche tornado. which killed 92 people, injuring 200 more. There have been 11 (E)F5 tornadoes recorded in Iowa, killing 200 people and injuring 1,524 more.
