= Chan-Ya-Ta Site =

- U.S. National Register of Historic Places
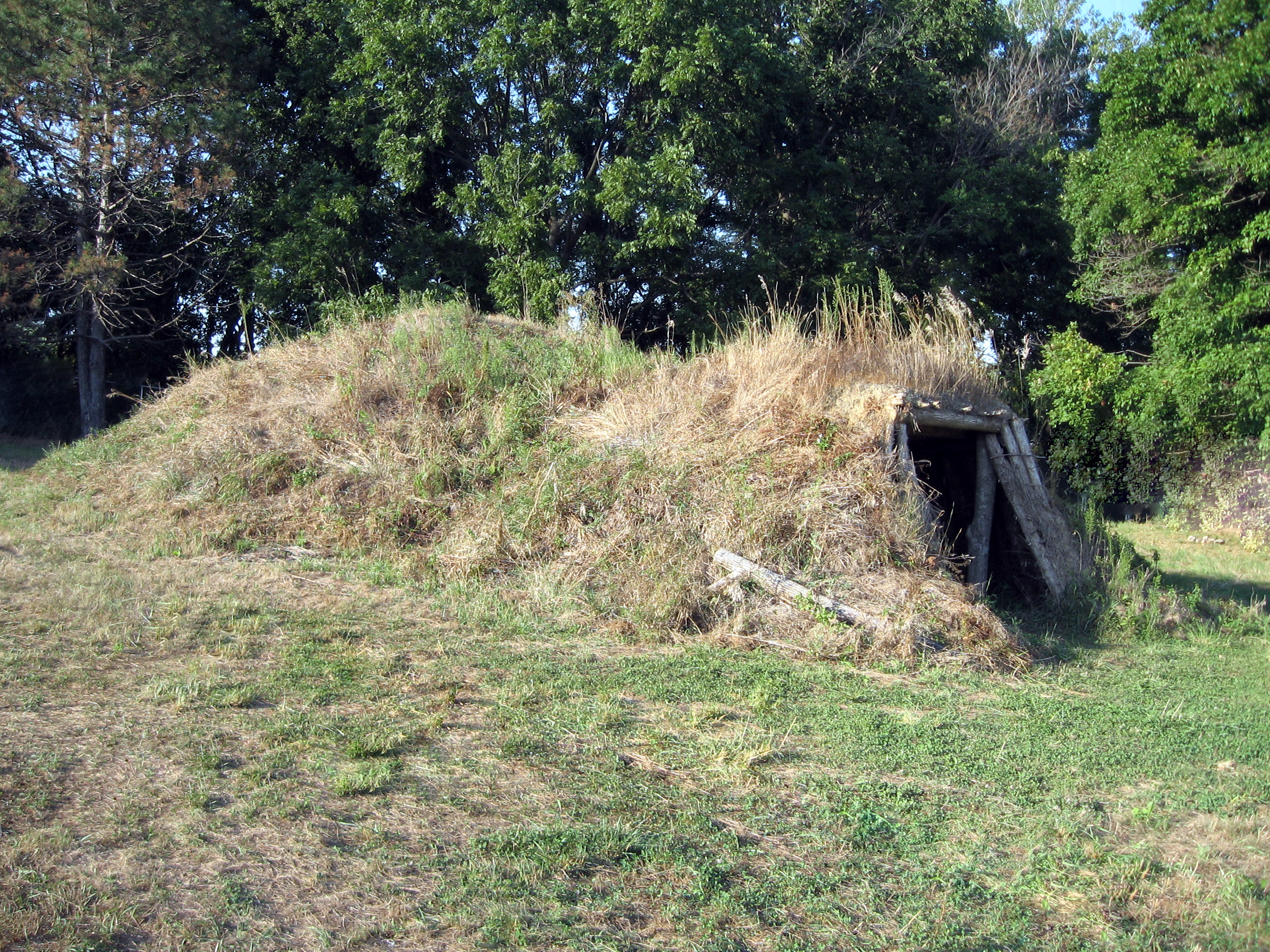
- A reconstructed earthlodge
- Nearest city: Linn Grove, Iowa
- NRHP reference No.: 78001209
- Added to NRHP: November 21, 1978

The Chan-Ya-Ta Site (13BV1) is a Late Prehistoric village in Buena Vista County, Iowa, United States, in which Native Americans lived in large earthlodge structures surrounded by a fortified ditch. The site is part of the Mill Creek Culture, which flourished in northwest Iowa 1100-1200 CE.

The site name is an amalgam of the first letters of the names of the different landowners who allowed access to the site, and is pronounced "chen-yata". It was the scene of the first Iowa Archeological Society field school.

== See also ==
- Mound
- Mound builder (people)
- Earthwork (archaeology)
