= Slinde Mounds State Preserve =

United States historic place in Iowa

- Slinde Mound Group
- U.S. National Register of Historic Places
- Location: Hanover Township, Allamakee County, Iowa, U.S.
- Nearest city: Waukon
- Area: 32 acres (130,000 m^{2})
- MPS: Prehistoric Mounds of the Quad-State Region of the Upper Mississippi River Valley MPS
- NRHP reference No.: 88001132
- Added to NRHP: November 1, 1989

Slinde Mounds State Preserve in Hanover Township, Allamakee County, Iowa, United States, contains ancient Indian mound burials in some hill prairie. About 32 acres (13 ha), it is on a terrace above Canoe Creek, a tributary of the Upper Iowa River, and is approximately six miles from Waukon.

The state acquired the land in 1979. Since 1989 listed on the National Register of Historic Places. It receives its name from the family who sold the land to the state.

It is located in the Driftless Area of Iowa, a region which escaped being glaciated during the last ice age. It is adjacent to the Canoe Creek Wildlife Management Area and the Upper Iowa Access hunting area.

== See also ==
- List of Registered Historic Places in Iowa
- Iowa archaeology
- List of burial mounds in the United States

== Sources ==
- "Slinde Mounds", Iowa Department of Natural Resources, Retrieved July 14, 2007
- Iowa DNR State Preserves, Retrieved July 14, 2007
