= Hartley Fort State Preserve =

State park in Iowa, United States

Coordinates: 43.43°N 91.36°W

Hartley Fort State Preserve is a 2-acre (8,100 m^{2}) state preserve located on the Upper Iowa River in the Driftless Area, in Allamakee County, Iowa, United States.

== Geography ==
Hartley Fort State Preserve sits on a terrace about 80 feet (24 m) above the Upper Iowa, seven miles (11 km) upstream of the confluence with the Upper Mississippi River.

== Native Americans ==
The site is noted for remains of a fortified Native American effigy mound settlement. The mound builder people's era ruins seem to be associated with the Woodland period Oneota and Cahokia cultures.

== Access ==
The Iowa Hartley Fort State Preserve land is privately owned, and there is currently no public access.

== See also ==
- Earthwork (archaeology)

== Sources ==
- "Hartley Fort State Preserve" (PDF). [Iowa Preserves Guide]. Iowa Department of Natural Resources. p. 69.
- "Item #10 - Archaeological Work at Hartley Fort / Request for archaeological testing at Hartley Fort" (PDF). Minutes of State Preserves Advisory Board. Motion was made by Martha Maxon to approve the request from Fred Finney to conduct test excavations at Hartley Fort with the three stipulations recommended by Chairperson Schermer. Seconded by Jonathan Steege. Motion carried unanimously. Charles City, Iowa: North Iowa Area Community College. June 13, 1994. pp. 2, 15. Archived from the original (PDF) on September 28, 2007.
- National Park Service, Department of the Interior; Robbins, John (March 25, 2004) [Dated: February 9, 2004; Filed: March 24, 2004]. "Notice of Intent to Repatriate Cultural Items: State Historical Society of Iowa, Iowa City, IA". Notices. Federal Register. Vol. 69, no. 58. pp. 15369–15371. FR Doc. 04–6643. DOCID:fr25mr04-95.
- Theler, James L.; Boszhardt, Robert F. (Fall 2000). "The End of the Effigy Mound Culture: The Late Woodland to Oneota Transition in Southwestern Wisconsin". Midcontinental Journal of Archaeology. 25 (2). The University of Iowa: 289–312. ISSN 0146-1109. JSTOR 20708138.
- Hartley Fort State Preserve - Iowa Department of Natural Resources
