= Folkert Mound Group =

- U.S. National Register of Historic Places
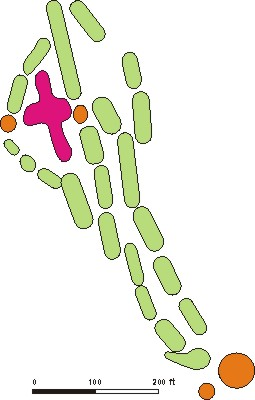
- Simple outline of the mound group, linears/compounds in green, conicals in orange, cruciform in red.

- Location within Iowa Location within the United States
- Location: near Steamboat Rock, Iowa
- Area: 4.5 acres (1.8 ha)
- Architectural style: Mound Group
- NRHP reference No.: 09000126
- Added to NRHP: March 17, 2009

The Folkert Mound Group of Hardin County, Iowa is a collection of 27 prehistoric mounds on the bluffs above the Iowa River, in a variety of shapes, including linear, compound, conical, and an enigmatic cruciform mound. The earliest map of the mounds was made by John Hotopp in 1974, and the mound group was mapped in detail in 2006. The alignment of the cruciform mound is especially interesting to researchers. Horton felt the cruciform mound aligned with the 11th century Crab Nebula supernova. However Lensink felt there was little evidence of this possible alignment. An apparent alignment of the largest conical mound, A, in the south with the end peaks of the cruciform mound, X, and an alignment between Mound X and the end of longest mound, T, has been postulated, but the meaning of these alignments is unknown.
