= Cherokee Sewer Site =

Archaic Period Indian archaeological site in Iowa

- U.S. National Register of Historic Places
- Location within Iowa Location within the United States
- Nearest city: Cherokee, Iowa
- NRHP reference No.: 74000777
- Added to NRHP: December 24, 1974

The Cherokee Sewer Site is a multi-component Prehistoric Indian Archaic bison processing site excavated in 1973 and 1976 near the sewage treatment plant of Cherokee, Iowa, United States. (Note: It is not associated with the Cherokee tribe of the Southeast or Oklahoma.)

Analysis of evidence from the site shows a transition in bison hunting strategy on the East Plains during the Archaic period in the Americas. Data from the Cherokee sewer excavations produced some of the earliest models for climate change in the Midwest.

A revisiting in the 1990s of "bison dentition and fetal elements" from the site indicates that the indigenous people of the Paleoindian and Early Archaic horizons conducted a late-fall to early-winter season of bison kill, rather than a mid- to late-winter season of kill, as suggested in the 1980 report. The evidence showed that there was a shift in the age of bison killed "from younger animals to older ones" during what is now known as the "mid-Holocene, roughly 6,000 years BP. Together these results suggest that "bison hunters on the eastern Plains used different adaptive strategies to cope with climate change than those seen on the western Plains."

The site is listed as an archeological site on the National Register of Historic Places.
