= Iowa Archeological Society =

Organization

The Iowa Archeological Society is an organization of academic, professional, and amateur archaeologists. It promotes education about Iowa's cultural past, conducts excavations, and encourages ethical collection and recording of archaeological sites. The society publishes the academic Journal of the Iowa Archeological Society and the IAS Newsletter.

Founded in 1951, the IAS was the brainchild of Charles R. Keyes, the founder in the 1920s of systematic archaeological research in Iowa. Keyes established and directed the Iowa State Archaeological Survey from 1921 to 1951. He, along with Ellison Orr in his later years, conducted the first extensive surveys, identifying numerous archeological sites in Iowa. Keyes also conducted numerous excavations. After a long partnership, both Keyes and Orr died in 1951, the first year of the IAS.
