= 2015 in Iowa =

- Decades: 1990s; 2000s; 2010s; 2020s
- See also: History of Iowa; Historical outline of Iowa; List of years in Iowa; 2015 in the United States

The following is a list of events of the year 2015 in Iowa.

== Incumbents ==
=== State government ===
- Governor: Terry Branstad (R)

== Events ==
- January 6 - Autumn Steele was fatally shot outside her home in Burlington, Iowa by police officer Jesse Hill.
- May 10 - An EF1 tornado touched down through Carroll and Calhoun counties, hitting Lake City, damaging homes and tearing off the roof of the high school while 150 people were inside.
- June 12 - Andrea Farrington is shot three times in the back at close range and killed in the Coral Ridge Mall by former security guard Alexander Kozak.
- June 19 - Shirley Carter was shot and killed in her home in Marion County.
- Throughout summer - Avian Influenza virus caused more than $1.2 billion in damage as a result of lost livestock.
- November 11 - A total of 19 tornadoes touched down causing an estimated $3-5 million in damages.
- December 10 - Bob Vander Plaats leader of The Family Leader announces his endorsement of Ted Cruz for the 2016 Republican Party presidential primaries. Cruz would win the 2016 Iowa Republican presidential caucuses.

== See also ==
2015 in the United States
