= Abortion in Iowa =

Abortion in Iowa is illegal for physicians after detection of embryonic cardiac-cell activity. Embryonic cardiac-cell activity can be detected from around six weeks after the pregnant woman’s last menstrual period, when many women are not yet aware that they are pregnant. Exceptions for the abortion ban after detected embryonic cardiac-cell activity include some instances of rape, incest, fetal abnormalities and threats to the pregnant woman’s life. However, HF 732, the Iowa Heartbeat Bill, states that the ban does not apply to the pregnant woman, as it says, “This section shall not be construed to impose civil or criminal liability on a woman upon whom an abortion is performed…” This, in effect, means that self-managed abortion is legal throughout pregnancy in Iowa.

Prior to 2024, abortion was legal up to 22 weeks in Iowa. In 2022, the U.S. Supreme Court overturned Roe v. Wade in Dobbs v. Jackson Women's Health Organization, which enabled states to ban abortion. In the aftermath of the decision, Republican lawmakers in Iowa enacted a six-week abortion ban in July 2023, which was blocked within days, then later unblocked in July 2024 with the approval of the Iowa Supreme Court.

Over recent decades, the number of abortion clinics in Iowa has generally decreased, and state legislators have regularly introduced bills to severely restrict abortion. Public opinion in Iowa remains about evenly split on whether abortion should be legal.

In 2017, Iowa rejected millions of dollars in federal funding for Medicaid as part of their efforts to try to defund Planned Parenthood and its abortion services in the state. In 2020, it was reported that abortions in Iowa went up for the first time in decades—25 percent—with the loss of that federal aid attributed to the increase.

In 2018, Planned Parenthood of the Heartland, Inc., Jill Meadows, M.D., and Emma Goldman Clinic (petitioners) filed a lawsuit seeking declaratory and injunctive relief in state court, arguing the early abortion ban violated the Iowa State Constitution. Courts supported their injunction request, saying the law violated the state's constitution.

== History ==
=== Legislative history ===
By the end of the 1800s, all states in the Union except Louisiana had therapeutic exceptions in their legislative bans on abortions. In the 19th century, bans by state legislatures on abortion were partly about protecting the life of the mother given the number of deaths caused by abortions; state governments saw themselves as looking out for the lives of their citizens.

In 2012, Iowa was one of three states where the legislature introduced a bill that would have banned abortion in almost all cases. It did not pass. The legislature tried and failed again in 2013, 2014, 2015, 2016, 2017 and 2018, where they were one of five states, one of three states, one of five states, one of four states, one of eleven states, and one of eleven states respectively trying to ban abortion.

In 2017 in Iowa, the Republican-controlled state legislature passed a bill that rejected millions of dollars in federal funding for Medicaid as part of their efforts to try to defund Planned Parenthood and its abortion services in the state. The state legislature was one of ten states nationwide that tried to unsuccessfully pass an early abortion ban in 2018. Only Iowa successfully passed such a bill, but it was struck down by the courts. The legislature had successfully passed a law moving the state's abortion ban to 6 weeks sometime between 2018 and 2019. This was struck down by the courts as too extreme. As of mid-April 2019, state law banned abortion after week 22. On May 4, 2018, governor Kim Reynolds signed into law a bill that would ban abortion in Iowa after embryonic cardiac activity is detected, starting July 1, 2018. On January 22, 2019, a county district judge declared the law to be in violation of Iowa's State Constitution and entered a permanent injunction prohibiting its enforcement. In 2019, women in Iowa were eligible for pregnancy accommodation and pregnancy-related disability as a result of legal abortion or miscarriage. Employers were required to offer up to eight weeks of unpaid leave if a woman did not have sufficient leave available.

In February 2020, the State Senate passed a constitutional amendment clarifying that there is no right to an abortion in the Iowa constitution. Approval in two consecutive legislative sessions is required for a constitutional amendment to appear on the ballot. The amendment passed the House and Senate in May 2021 but did not pass in the 2023–2024 legislative session.

In July 2023, Governor Kim Reynolds arranged for a special session for the Iowa legislature, which according to Reynolds had "the sole purpose of enacting legislation that addresses abortion and protects unborn lives." During the session on July 11, 2023, a bill (House File 732) to further restrict abortions was passed by the Iowa House 56–34 and the Iowa Senate 32–17. Only Iowa Republican lawmakers supported the bill, with all Iowa Democratic lawmakers who were present at the special session voting against the bill, along with three Iowa Republican lawmakers that voted against. Reynolds signed the bill into state law on July 14, 2023.

The 2023 bill was written to ban abortion upon the detection of embryonic cardiac-cell activity. This can be detected from around six weeks after the woman's last menstrual period, when many women are not yet aware that they are pregnant. State courts blocked the law on July 17, 2023, and lifted the block on July 29, 2024.

=== Judicial history ===
The US Supreme Court's decision in 1973's Roe v. Wade ruling meant the state could no longer regulate abortion in the first trimester.

On May 15, 2018, eleven days after Iowa Governor Kim Reynolds signed SF 359 into law, Planned Parenthood of the Heartland, Inc., Jill Meadows, M.D., and Emma Goldman Clinic (petitioners) filed a lawsuit seeking declaratory and injunctive relief in state court arguing the early abortion ban violated the Iowa State Constitution. On June 1, 2018, Polk County District Court Judge Michael Huppert entered a preliminary injunction which temporarily blocked the law from going into effect. On January 22, 2019, the county district judge declared the law to be in violation of the Iowa Constitution and entered a permanent injunction prohibiting its enforcement. In holding the law unconstitutional the judge cited the Iowa Supreme Court's 2018 ruling in a challenge to a different abortion restriction in which the state's court of last resort held that "a woman's right to decide whether to terminate a pregnancy is a fundamental right under the Iowa Constitution." Anti-abortion proponents said they hoped this litigation created a pathway for Roe v. Wade to be reexamined by the U.S. Supreme Court, but University of Iowa law professor Paul Gowder and other legal experts said that it was almost impossible that it could end up in front of the U.S. Supreme Court, as the U.S. Supreme Court does not review Supreme Court decisions concerning state constitutional questions.

Anti-abortion legislators have filed legislation to amend the state constitution to state, "that the Constitution of the State of Iowa does not secure or protect a right to or require the funding of abortion." The resolutions proposing to amend Iowa's constitutions are SJR 9 and HJR 5 which were filed on January 24, 2019, and February 6, 2019, respectively.

On June 17, 2022, the Iowa Supreme Court ruled that the state constitution does not protect the right to an abortion. Justice Edward Mansfield wrote in the majority that "All we hold today is that the Iowa Constitution is not the source of a fundamental right to an abortion necessitating a strict scrutiny standard of review for regulations affecting that right". The court's decision is a reversal of its 2018 ruling, where it found that the constitution protects the right to an abortion.

The U.S. Supreme Court overturned Roe v. Wade in Dobbs v. Jackson Women's Health Organization, No. 19-1392, 597 U.S. ___ (2022) later in 2022. Iowa instituted a 24-hour waiting period for abortions, and clinics lost staff, leading to a 13% decrease in legal abortions in Iowa within a year of the U.S. Supreme Court decision.

In June 2023, the Iowa Supreme Court deadlocked 3–3 on a proposed six-week abortion ban, leaving in place a lower court order that blocked the law. The ban could not be enforced, and abortion remained legal up to 20 weeks in the state.

In July 2023, Judge Joseph Seidlin of Polk County ruled on a lawsuit against the July 2023 legislation that generally restricted abortions to six weeks; Seidlin ruled that based on Iowa Supreme Court precedent, the "undue burden" standard should be applied to this case, and that under this standard, the legislation is "likely" unconstitutional on due process grounds; thus Seidlin ordered the legislation temporarily blocked.

In June 2024, the Iowa Supreme Court, in a 4–3 decision, ruled that the July 2023 legislation that generally restricted abortions to six weeks was not unconstitutional based on the "rational basis" standard because it was "rationally related to the state’s legitimate interest in protecting unborn life […] The state’s interest in protecting the unborn can be traced to Iowa’s earliest days". Thus, the Iowa Supreme Court instructed for lifting of the block on the July 2023 law.

=== Clinic history ===
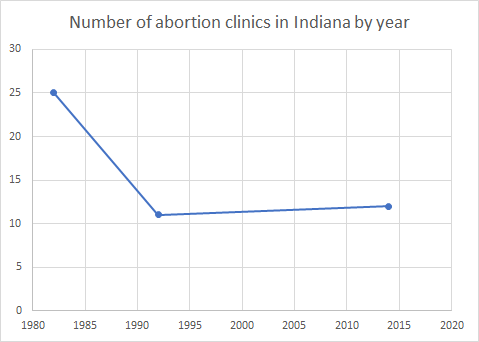
Number of abortion clinics in Iowa by year

Between 1982 and 1992, the number of abortion clinics in the state decreased by fourteen, going from 25 in 1982 to eleven in 1992. In 2014, there were twelve abortion clinics in the state. In 2014, 89% of the counties in the state did not have an abortion clinic. That year, 42% of women in the state aged 15–44 lived in a county without an abortion clinic. In March 2016, there were 13 Planned Parenthood clinics in the state. In 2017, there were eight Planned Parenthood clinics in a state with a population of 680,659 women aged 15–49 of which five offered abortion services. In 2023, there were nine Planned Parenthood clinics, but Planned Parenthood announced it would close three of them. In 2025, Planned Parenthood North Central States announced it would close four clinics in Minnesota and four in Iowa due to federal funding cuts. In 2026, there were two Planned Parenthood clinics, but Planned Parenthood announced it would close one, leaving only one clinic in the state.

=== Governor's 2020 Coronavirus emergency declaration ===
On March 26, 2020, Governor Kim Reynolds expanded upon previous COVID-19 disaster proclamations to halt elective and non-essential surgeries. The following day her office asserted: "[The] Proclamation suspends all nonessential or elective surgeries and procedures until April 16th, that includes surgical abortion procedures".

== Statistics ==
In the period between 1972 and 1974, there were no recorded illegal abortion deaths in the state. In 1990, 302,000 women in the state faced the risk of an unintended pregnancy. In 2001, Arizona, Florida, Iowa, Louisiana, Massachusetts, and Wisconsin did not provide any residence related data regarding abortions performed in the state to the Centers for Disease Control.

In 2017, the state had an infant mortality rate of 5.3 deaths per 1,000 live births. In 2010, the state had 23 publicly funded abortions, of which were three federally and twenty were state funded. In 2013, among white women aged 15–19, there were 380 abortions, 60 abortions for black women aged 15–19, 0 abortions for Hispanic women aged 15–19, and 60 abortions for women of all other races.

Number of reported abortions, abortion rate and percentage change in rate by geographic region and state in 1992, 1995 and 1996
Census division and state	Number			Rate			% change 1992–1996
Census division and state	1992	1995	1996	1992	1995	1996	% change 1992–1996
West North Central	57,340	48,530	48,660	14.3	11.9	11.9	–16
Iowa	6,970	6,040	5,780	11.4	9.8	9.4	–17
Kansas	12,570	10,310	10,630	22.4	18.3	18.9	–16
Minnesota	16,180	14,910	14,660	15.6	14.2	13.9	–11
Missouri	13,510	10,540	10,810	11.6	8.9	9.1	–21
Nebraska	5,580	4,360	4,460	15.7	12.1	12.3	–22
North Dakota	1,490	1,330	1,290	10.7	9.6	9.4	–13
South Dakota	1,040	1,040	1,030	6.8	6.6	6.5	–4

Number, rate, and ratio of reported abortions, by reporting area of residence and occurrence and by percentage of abortions obtained by out-of-state residents, US CDC estimates
Location	Residence			Occurrence			% obtained by out-of-state residents	Year	Ref
Location	No.	Rate^	Ratio^^	No.	Rate^	Ratio^^	% obtained by out-of-state residents	Year	Ref
Iowa	3,766	6.4	95	4,020	6.9	101	13.8	2014	
Iowa	3,467	5.9	88	3,722	6.3	94	15.2	2016	
^number of abortions per 1,000 women aged 15–44; ^^number of abortions per 1,000 live births

== Public opinion ==
In 2014, opinion was about evenly split. 52% of Iowa adults said abortion should be legal, while 46% said it should be illegal in all or most cases, according to a Pew Research Center poll.

In a March 2020 poll by Selzer & Co, 48% of Iowans believe abortion should be legal in all or most cases while 45% believe it should be illegal in all or most cases.

In a September 2021 poll by Selzer & Co, 57% of Iowans believe abortion should be legal in all or most cases while 39% believe it should be illegal in all or most cases.

The 2023 American Values Atlas reported that, in their most recent survey, 59% of Iowans said that abortion should be legal in all or most cases.

== Pro-choice views and activities ==
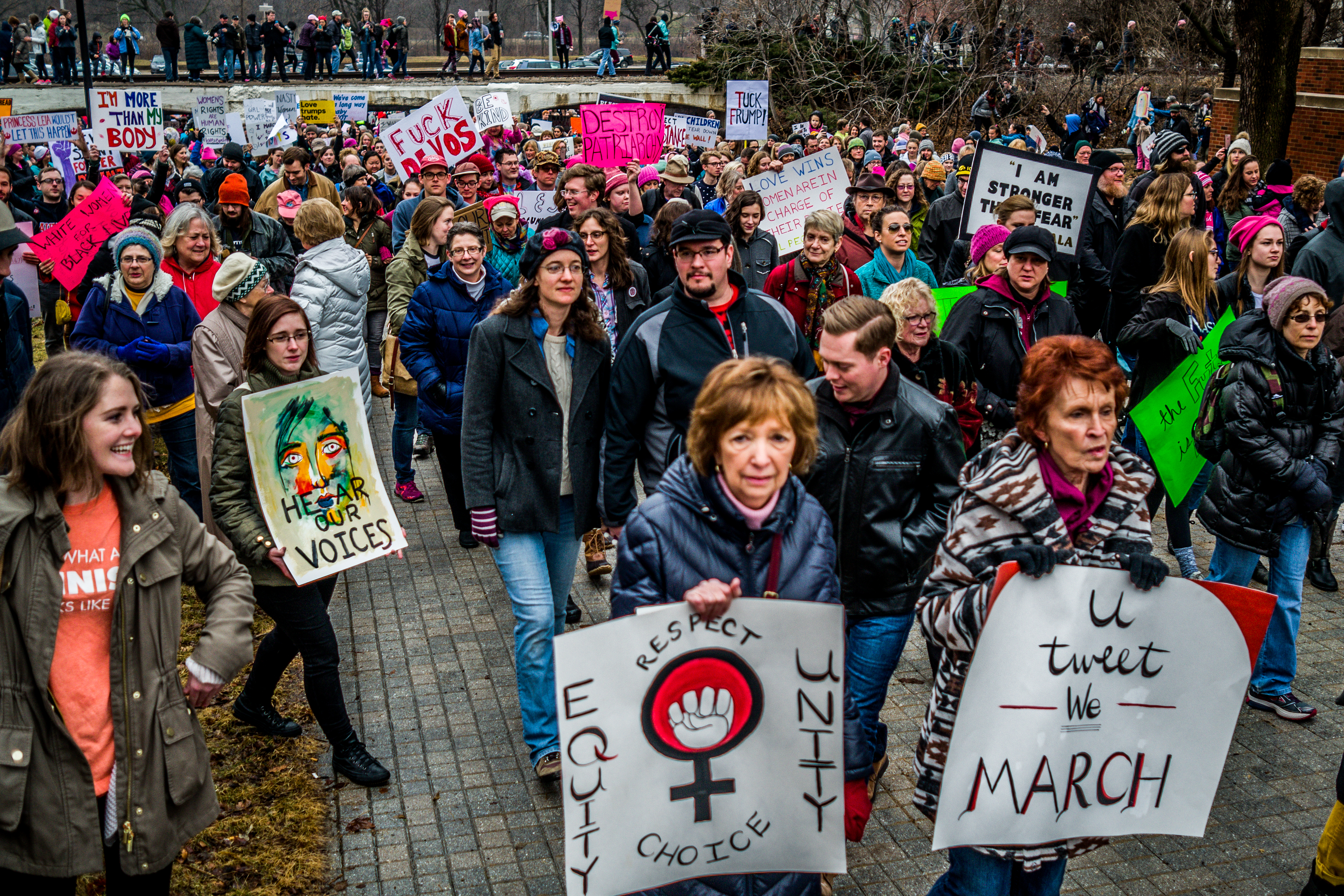
Women's March (Iowa City) in 2017.

=== Protests ===
Women from the state participated in marches supporting abortion rights as part of a #StoptheBans movement in May 2019. One protest occurred at the Statehouse in Des Moines, Iowa on May 21, 2019.

Following the overturn of Roe v. Wade on June 24, 2022, Iowa saw protests in Des Moines and Cedar Rapids. During a protest in Cedar Rapids near the U.S. District Court Federal Court House, a truck ran over a woman's foot. The driver of the truck was later arrested and charged with assault. On July 22, an anti-abortion rights man was arrested after assaulting a group of abortion rights protesters in McGregor.

In Des Moines, Iowa on July 11–12, 2023, a crowd of abortion rights protesters rallied as the Iowa state legislature passed a 6-week abortion ban, just weeks after a similar ban was struck down by the Iowa Supreme Court. Several abortion rights protesters were escorted out of the gallery by police after heckling the legislature.

In Des Moines, Iowa on April 11, 2024, an abortion rights protest was held outside the state courthouse while the Iowa Supreme Court heard oral arguments on a proposed 6-week abortion ban.

In Cedar Rapids, Iowa on June 29, 2024, an abortion rights protest was held following the Iowa Supreme Court's ruling to uphold a 6-week abortion ban.

== Pro-life views and activities ==
=== Activities ===
The Marriage Vow or "The Marriage Vow - A Declaration of Dependence Upon Marriage and Family" is a political pledge created by Bob Vander Plaats, a former candidate for Iowa governor, and the Iowa-based conservative group; The Family Leader, a public advocacy organization affiliated with the Iowa Family Policy Center, that he heads. The 2 most notable signatures came from Rick Santorum and Michele Bachmann. Rick Santorum was the first presidential candidate to contact The Family Leader after the organization publicly announced the pledge. Michele Bachmann also contacted The Family Leader to sign the pledge, and became the first Candidate to send her signed document to the organization. Although Newt Gingrich did not sign the pledge, he wrote a lengthy letter in which he upheld many of the principles of the pledge including personal fidelity to his wife, respecting the marital bonds of others, enforcing the defense of marriage act, to support a federal marriage amendment, and to oppose any definition of marriage outside of "one man and one woman." The pledge was also signed by former Texas governor Rick Perry.

=== Violence ===
On September 11, 2006, David McMenemy of Rochester Hills, Michigan, crashed his car into the Edgerton Women's Care Center in Davenport, Iowa. He then doused the lobby in gasoline and started a fire. McMenemy committed these acts in the belief that the center was performing abortions; however, Edgerton is not an abortion clinic. Time magazine listed the incident in a "Top 10 Inept Terrorist Plots" list.

During an abortion rights protest on June 24, 2022, in Cedar Rapids, Iowa near the U.S. District Court Federal Court House, a truck ran over a woman's foot. The driver of the truck was later arrested and charged with assault. On July 22, 2022, an anti-abortion rights man was arrested after assaulting a group of abortion rights protesters in McGregor.

== See also ==
- Health in Iowa
