= 2026 in Iowa =

- Decades: 2000s; 2010s; 2020s
- See also: History of Iowa; Historical outline of Iowa; List of years in Iowa; 2026 in the United States

The following is a list of events of the year 2026 in Iowa.

== Incumbents ==
=== State government ===
- Governor: Kim Reynolds (R)

== Events ==
- February 11 – A bus carrying the Iowa Lakes Community College baseball team crashes near Twin Lakes, killing one person and injuring 32.
- April 19 – Five people, including three University of Iowa students, are injured in a shooting in Downtown Iowa City.
- June 1 – A man kills six people in a series of shootings in Muscatine. The victims were all family members of the shooter, who commits suicide as police confront him.
- August 8 – Senator Chuck Grassley announces that his long-time vacuum cleaner "Beth", which he has been using for 49 years, has died.
- November 3:
  - 2026 Iowa House of Representatives election
  - 2026 Iowa Senate election
  - 2026 Iowa Attorney General election
  - 2026 Iowa State Auditor election
  - 2026 Iowa gubernatorial election: State Auditor Rob Sand wins election, beating Republican businessman Zach Lahn.
  - 2026 Iowa Secretary of Agriculture election
  - 2026 Iowa Secretary of State election
  - 2026 United States House of Representatives elections in Iowa: Democrats flip three of Iowa's four seats, with Christina Bohannan and Sarah Trone Garriott beating incumbents Mariannette Miller-Meeks and Zach Nunn in Iowa's 1st district and 3rd district, respectively.
  - 2026 United States Senate election in Iowa: State Representative Josh Turek beats Representative Ashley Hinson to win the election.
- November 5 – Two United States Postal Service (USPS) employees are shot at a post office in Des Moines. Another USPS employee is arrested.

== See also ==
- 2026 in the United States
