= List of killings by law enforcement officers in the United States, January 2015 =

This is a list of people reported killed by non-military law enforcement officers in the United States in January 2015, whether in the line of duty or not, and regardless of reason or method. The listing documents the occurrence of a death, making no implications regarding wrongdoing or justification on the part of the person killed or officer involved. Killings are arranged by date of the incident that caused death. Different death dates, if known, are noted in the description. The table below lists 96 people.

== January 2015 ==
Date	Name (age) of deceased	Race	State (city)	Description
2015-01-31	Edward Donnell Bright Sr. (54)	Black	Maryland (Randallstown)	Bright was allegedly armed with a knife, which he refused to drop. Officers used tasers initially but said he continued to approach them. Officers shot and killed him.
2015-01-31	Victor Reyes (31)	Hispanic	Texas (Houston)	(Police action) After two men were shot and killed in Houston, a Harris County Sheriff’s deputy said he heard shots and pursued Reyes. Police said Reyes refused demands to drop his gun and was shot and killed by the deputy.
2015-01-30	John Barry Marshall (48)	White	Montana (Billings)	Marshall, wanted for burglary at his own house, was spotted outside a Billings Clinic. A task force of six police responded and for failing to apprehend him immediately cause Marshall to flee. Witnesses reported that he ran, and shot in the back several times by police causing him to trip on a curb, fell, and a police round discharged through the window of the clinic. Marshall fell face down on the ground, and died a few minutes later.
2015-01-29	Alan James (31)	White	Michigan (Wyoming)	Alan James was shot on January 29 and died of his injuries on February 7. The shooting occurred when officers responded to a domestic disturbance and James, with a blood alcohol content of 0.28, fired at officers and wounded at least one.
2015-01-29	Wendell King (40)	White	Texas (Fort Worth)	(Domestic disturbance) Police responded to a domestic disturbance and Wendell King was shot and killed after he fired a weapon and hit a police officer.
2015-01-29	Ralph W. Willis (42)	White	Oklahoma (Stillwater)	(Fire) Police, alerted to an apartment fire, and found a body in the apartment. Willis had left the apartment during the fire. Police later found Willis and chased him; Police said they shot and killed Willis after he "made an aggressive move toward the officer."
2015-01-28	Matautu Nuu (35)	Native Hawaiian or Pacific Islander	California (Stockton)	Stockton Police called to a disturbance found Nuu, angry and intoxicated, in the street waving a hammer. A police dog was released to subdue him and he hit the dog on the snout with the hammer. As the officers approached Nuu he came at them with the hammer. They shot and killed him.
2015-01-28	Cody Karasek (26)	White	Texas (Rosenberg)	(Domestic disturbance) The incident began when Karasek, an ex-boyfriend of Elizabeth Martin, broke into the home she shared with Jeffrey Obersteller. Martin was shot and killed by the alleged suspect, while Obersteller was shot five times. The suspect fled the scene and later exchanged gunfire with police near Traylor Stadium. Two police officers, on the force for two years, shot and killed the alleged suspect. The man was shot while in a white vehicle that was stopped near Traylor Stadium.
2015-01-28	Kobuk, Larry (33)		Alaska (Anchorage)	Kobuk was being held at the Anchorage Jail on two counts of first-degree vehicle theft, along with various other charges. He "became combative and correctional officers had to restrain him," according to troopers. Shortly after he became unresponsive and was pronounced dead at Alaska Regional Hospital.
2015-01-28	Alan Lance Alverson (45)	White	Texas (Wise County)	(Police action) Police attempted to arrest the suspect on an outstanding warrant. The suspect fled and later killed a K9. Troopers returned fire.
2015-01-28	Nicholas Leland Tewa (26)	Native American	Arizona (Phoenix)	(Police surveillance) A twenty-five (or 26)-year-old man was shot inside a car after exiting a motel and "began ramming the occupied police vehicle" with his (stolen) vehicle. He was pronounced dead at the scene.
2015-01-27	Tiffany D. Terry (39)	White	Nebraska (Omaha)	Omaha police responded to Terry's residence after she had allegedly assaulted several people, including two of her children. Terry, wielding several knives, lunged at an officer on her front porch and then threw another knife at the officer before being shot multiple times. Terry later died on January 29, 2015, at Nebraska Medical Center. Per state law, a grand jury will investigate the officers' actions.
2015-01-27	Jermonte Fletcher (33)	Black	Ohio (Columbus)	Fletcher was under investigation due to gang activity. Officers located him at his home and attempted to have him surrender. Fletcher fired at officers, who fired back, killing him.
2015-01-27	Raymond Kmetz (68)	White	Minnesota (New Hope)	(Mental patient) (Police action) Kmetz, who had a reported history of mental illness, shot and wounded two police officers during a ceremony. Officers exchanged gunfire with Kmetz, killing him.
2015-01-26	David Garcia (34)	Hispanic	California (Wasco)	(Mental illness) Officers responded to a call about a suicidal person. Officers forcibly entered the home and allegedly found Garcia with a knife. He was shot and killed.
2015-01-26	Joshua Omar Garcia (24)	Hispanic	Texas (Tahoka)	(Police action) After a chase, Garcia was arrested and handcuffed. He then attempted to drive off in a police cruiser and was shot and killed.
2015-01-26	Chris Ingram (29)	White	Arizona (Morenci)	(Domestic disturbance) Officers responding to a domestic violence call found the suspect had left the scene. They made a traffic stop where the suspect fired at officers, hitting two. Officers fired back and Ingram was pronounced dead at Gila Health Clinic.
2015-01-26	Steele, Rhiannon L. (35)		Oregon (Salem)	(Police action) Steele was one of two passengers in a pickup driven by her 17-year-old son, who was pursued by police for three miles after an attempted traffic stop. The truck crashed during the chase, killing Steele and causing serious injury to the other passenger.
2015-01-26	Haynes, Alvin (57)		California (San Francisco)	Inmate Haynes was in custody after a probation violation. His death in custody is under investigation since there was no clear medical history explaining his death.
2015-01-25	William Campbell (59)	Unknown race	New Jersey (Winslow)	(Domestic disturbance) Officers responded to a woman being held at gunpoint. On arrival, a woman approached the officer and screamed about a man with a gun. Campbell allegedly approached the vehicle while pointing a gun at the officer, who then shot and killed him.
2015-01-25	Orlando Jude Lopez (26)	Hispanic	Colorado (Pueblo)	(Police action) Lopez and another individual were pursued by police, suspected of a home invasion. Shots were exchanged between Lopez and officers and Lopez was killed.
2015-01-25	Jessica Hernandez (17)	Hispanic	Colorado (Denver)	(Police action) Hernandez, a minor, was shot after reportedly striking an officer with a stolen vehicle. However, witnesses in the vehicle stated that the officer was struck after Hernandez was incapacitated and lost control of the vehicle.
2015-01-24	Darin Hutchins (26)	Black	Maryland (Baltimore)	(Domestic disturbance) Allegedly Hutchins was threatening to stab people at a toddler’s birthday party. He refused to drop the knife when officers responded to the call, and was shot once in the chest.
2015-01-24	Daryl Myler (45)	White	Idaho (Rexburg)	(Police action) After committing an armed robbery, Myler exchanged shots with local police and was killed.
2015-01-23	Robert Francis Mesch (61)	White	Texas (Austin)	(Domestic disturbance) Officers responded to a call about a suicidal husband from his wife stating that he was threatening her. By the time officers arrived, Mesch had already left the home; leading to a slow-speed chase. Mesch finally exited his vehicle with a revolver, which he aimed at officers. An officer then shot and killed Mesch.
2015-01-23	Jose Antonio Espinoza Ruiz (56)	Hispanic	Texas (Levelland)	(Domestic disturbance) Officers responded to a call about a husband threatening his wife. On arrival they found Ruiz allegedly armed with a knife, threatening his wife. They shot and killed him.
2015-01-23	Demaris Turner (29)	Black	Florida (Lauderhill)	(Police action) Police confronted the suspect while investigating a stolen vehicle. Turner allegedly rammed the stolen car into a marked K-9 cruiser. Turner was shot at least 11 times and pronounced dead at Broward Health Medical Center.
2015-01-22	Kristiana Coignard (17)	White	Texas (Longview)	(Mental patient) Coignard, a minor with a history of mental illness, walked into a police station lobby and used a lobby phone to request assistance from a police officer. She had the words "I have a gun" written on her hand and threatened police with a knife. After a Taser apparently had no effect, she was shot four times in the trunk and extremities.
2015-01-22	Isaac Holmes (19)	Black	Missouri (St. Louis)	Holmes was a passenger in a stolen car and allegedly exited the vehicle with a gun. Officers ordered him to drop the gun and after he refused he was shot and killed.
2015-01-22	Tiano Meton (25)	Black	Texas (Sierra Blanca)	Meton drove past a checkpoint without stopping for another 30 miles. When agents approached, one allegedly noticed a gun and shots were fired by two agents, killing Meton.
2015-01-22	Todd Allen Hodge (36)	White	California (Riverside)	Hodge allegedly shot and killed a police K-9 on January 20. Deputies had a standoff with Hodge at his home, which he finally exited while armed with a handgun. He was then shot and killed by deputies.
2015-01-21	Andrew J. Toto (54)	White	New Hampshire (Derry)	Police received a 911 call from the wife of an armed, upset, suicidal man. An officer responding encountered Toto’s parked truck, and the man fired on the officer. The officer returned fire, hitting Toto once, killing him.
2015-01-21	John Ballard Gorman (45)	White	Mississippi (Tunica County)	Gorman, an enforcement officer for the Mississippi Gaming Commission, was killed by accidental discharge of a gun during a training exercise.
2015-01-21	Miguel Angel de Santos-Rodriguez (36)	Hispanic	Texas (Chapeno)	Mexican national de Santos-Rodriguez was shot and killed by a US Border Patrol agent after allegedly exchanging gunfire with agents while resisting arrest.
2015-01-20	Carr, Dewayne (45)		Arizona (Scottsdale)	(Police surveillance) Carr, unknowingly under police surveillance as part of an investigation into a credit card fraud ring, had his vehicle surrounded and blocked in by unmarked police cars. He rammed a police car and was shot by undercover police.
2015-01-19	Paul Campbell (49)	White	Massachusetts (Weymouth)	Officers responded to a routine medical call, arriving to find Campbell allegedly agitated and armed with a knife or knives. Police also noticed a woman’s body on the steps into the house. After a confrontation with Campbell, two officers shot Campbell. He was pronounced dead at the hospital. Police had previously made three other unremarkable medical assistance calls at the home.
2015-01-19	Carter Ray Castle (67)	White	Kentucky (Gunlock)	County and state police went to the suspect’s house to arrest him on a warrant, but Castle was outside his home and armed. Officers attempted to negotiate then use tasers but were unable to subdue him. After he attempted to turn toward police with his gun, a trooper shot him. He was pronounced dead a day later at the St. Mary’s Medical Center.
2015-01-19	Quincy Reed Reindl (24)	White	Minnesota (Bloomington)	Officers responded to a report of a suicidal man at his apartment. Reindl was found outside his apartment and refused commands to drop his weapon. He was shot multiple times, five blocks from his apartment. The shooting is still under investigation.
2015-01-18	Sinthanouxay Khottavongsa (57)	Asian	Minnesota (Hennepin County)	(Police action) Police responded to multiple calls about armed people fighting. Suspect allegedly seen holding a crowbar, which he refused to drop. An officer then used a Taser on Khottavonsa, leading him to fall and hit his head. He died from blunt force head injury on Jan 18, two days after incident.
2015-01-18	Jonathan Guillory (32)	White	Arizona (Maricopa)	(Mental patient) While responding to a 911 hang-up call, police officers shot Guillory after he pointed a gun at them. Guillory was a combat veteran who had been a diagnosed with post traumatic stress disorder.
2015-01-17	Daniel Brumley (27)	Black	Texas (Fort Worth)	Officer pulled Brumley over, leading to an altercation. The man stabbed the officer multiple times in the leg and the officer shot and killed Brumley.
2015-01-17	Terence Walker, Jr. (21)	Black	Oklahoma (Muskogee)	(Domestic disturbance) Walker waiting outside church for his girlfriend, suspected to be armed. Police exchanged words with him when he took off running. An item fell, Walker picked it up, allegedly turned toward officer. Officer then shot Walker multiple times, killing him.
2015-01-17	Pablo Meza (24)	Hispanic	California (Los Angeles)	Meza was firing shots into the air at an intersection while on his knees. Officers ordered him to drop the gun; after he refused he was fatally shot by officers.
2015-01-16	Kavonda Earl Payton (39)	Black	Colorado (Aurora)	Police in pursuit of an armed robbery suspect, chased after Payton. After he allegedly refused to comply with an officer’s demands, Payton was shot and killed.
2015-01-16	Phillip Adam Garcia (26)	Black	Texas (Houston)	Off-duty police officers were working second job at bar when argument broke out between two groups. An unnamed male involved in the altercation possessed a gun. Allegedly the off-duty officer asked him to put the gun down but he refused, the off-duty cop then shot and killed the unnamed male.
2015-01-16	Zaki Shinwary (48)	White	California (Fremont)	Shinwary reportedly attacked two contractors with a knife before officers arrived on the scene. He repeatedly ignored commands to stop. One officer shot and killed him when he allegedly came at the officer with the knife, another officer simultaneously fired a taser.
2015-01-16	Scott Hall (41)	White	Texas (Kaufman)	(Police action) Hall was the subject of an ATF investigation that led to a police chase involving ATF officers and Texas Rangers. Another suspect was also shot but transported to a hospital.
2015-01-16	Prestianni, Christina (37)		New Jersey (Nutley)	A state corrections officer shot and killed his girlfriend and himself in an apparent murder-suicide.
2015-01-16	Rodney Walker (23)	Black	Oklahoma (Tulsa)	An off-duty officer stopped to help Walker and his girlfriend after witnessing a domestic argument. Walker allegedly reached for a gun and the officer shot and killed him.
2015-01-15	Nathan Ryan Massey (33)	White	Louisiana (Acadiana)	Massey was shot and killed by State Police after allegedly taking his girlfriend hostage.
2015-01-15	Robbins, Howard (69)		Kentucky (Stanford)	(Pedestrian) Howard "Robert" Robbins was struck and killed by a Stanford police cruiser.
2015-01-15	Jose Ceja (36)	Hispanic	California (Fairfield)	(Drunk and disorderly) (Domestic disturbance) Brandishing a knife and charging at a police officer, Ceja was shot multiple times by the officer. Ceja was drunk and was causing a disturbance at his home which prompted relatives to call police on him.
2015-01-15	DeWayne Carr (42)	Black	Arizona (Scottsdale)	Scottsdale Police in unmarked cars were trying to stop a suspect vehicle they had under surveillance in a credit card theft ring. As they surrounded the vehicle the driver began to ram their vehicles in his attempt to escape. At least two officers fired at least four shots and mortally wounded the driver, Dewayne Carr.
2015-01-15	Donte Sowell (27)	Black	Indiana (Indianapolis)	(Police action) Sowell shot a police officer after attempting to escape on foot from a traffic stop. A police officer and an armed security guard returned fire, killing Sowell.
2015-01-14	Michael T. Goebel (29)	White	Missouri (St. Louis)	(Police action) Goebel was suspected of being involved in a stolen car ring and was wanted by several agencies. During a raid, he attempted to escape in a truck, striking an officer and a vehicle with the truck. He was pronounced dead after being air lifted to a hospital.
2015-01-14	Jeffrey R. Nielson (34)	White	Utah (Draper)	(Police action) An officer on the way to work came across Nielson slumped over in a car and found evidence of narcotics violation. During the arrest attempt, Nielson got free, allegedly obtained a knife, and attacked the officer. The officer then shot and killed the suspect.
2015-01-14	Marcus Ryan Golden (24)	Black	Minnesota (Saint Paul)	Golden was killed after police said that he failed to obey orders and that he drove his vehicle at an officer in an apartment building parking lot. Police had been called to the building on the 200 block of University Avenue E. on a report that Golden was making death threats via text message.
2015-01-14	Talbot Schroeder (75)	White	New Jersey (Old Bridge)	Before 6:00 a.m., Schroeder attacked a family member (who was not seriously injured), threatened another, and injured himself with a large kitchen knife. He refused to drop the knife when ordered by the officer, and was shot instead.
2015-01-14	Mario A. Jordan (34)	Black	Virginia (Chesapeake)	Chesapeake, Virginia Police officers responded to a call about a suicidal man. When the officers arrived the man shot at them with his rifle. They returned fire and mortally wounded Jordan, who died later at a hospital.
2015-01-14	Robert Edwards (68)	White	Texas (Lake Jackson)	(Domestic disturbance) Officers responded to a call that Edwards was armed and pointing a weapon at a roommate. On arrival, officers asked him to drop the weapon, after he refused, three officers fired. He was hit with multiple gunshots and killed.
2015-01-14	Becker, Louis F. (87)		New York (Syracuse)	The victim was killed in a traffic accident when his pickup truck collided with a state trooper’s marked police SUV.
2015-01-13	Richard McClendon (43)	White	Texas (Jourdanton)	(Domestic disturbance) McClendon, known by the police to have mental health issues, barricaded himself in his mother's home and was 'causing a disturbance'. He charged with a knife when they urged him to come out. After a taser fired by one officer failed, another officer fired one round, which was fatal.
2015-01-13	John Edward Okeefe (34)	White	New Mexico (Albuquerque)	(Police action) Okeefe, suspected of criminal activity and wearing body armor, was shot and killed after running from and shooting at police officers.
2015-01-11	Thomas Hamby (49)	White	Utah (Syracuse)	(Police action) Police responded to a woman's report that her boyfriend was armed and acting strangely. After surrounding the house, the officers told Hamby to come out. He then fired at the officers and was shot. He died two days later.
2015-01-11	Tommy E. Smith (39)	White	Illinois (Arcola)	(Domestic Disturbance) Police officers, responding to a report of a domestic disturbance, shot and killed Smith after he confronted them with an assault rifle and a handgun.
2015-01-11	Brian Barbosa (23)	Hispanic	California (Los Angeles)	(Police action) Suspect allegedly attempted multiple carjackings. He was shot during confrontation with officers.
2015-01-11	Salvador Figueroa (29)	Hispanic	Nevada (Las Vegas)	(Police action) Suspect allegedly ran from police during an investigation. Initially police used a taser to subdue him. Police said Figueroa then pulled a handgun and an officer shot him multiple times.
2015-01-09	Loren Benjamin Simpson (28)	White	Montana (Billings)	(Police action) Simpson was shot and killed after attempting to run down two sheriff's deputies investigating a report of a stolen vehicle.
2015-01-09	Martinez, Andy (33)		Texas (El Paso)	(Traffic stop) Martinez was a passenger in a vehicle which was stopped for an expired registration sticker. Allegedly he began to exit the vehicle with a handgun and yelled back at officers instead of dropping the weapon. The officer then shot and killed Martinez.
2015-01-09	Jimmy Foreman (71)	White	Arkansas (England)	(Domestic disturbance) According to witnesses, Foreman shot his son, and when police arrived, did not listen to orders to put away his weapon. Police fired and killed him.
2015-01-08	Artago Damon Howard (36)	Black	Arkansas (Monroe)	(Police action) Howard was found inside a pharmacy after an alarm was triggered. During a brief struggle with the responding deputy, the deputy's weapon discharged and the bullet struck Artago Howard, who fled. Howard was found dead shortly after.
2015-01-08	James Dudley Barker (42)	White	Utah (Salt Lake City)	(Police action) A police officer, responding to reports of a suspicious man looking into peoples car windows, confronted Barker. Barker stated that he was asking to shovel people's driveways and walkways, despite much of the snow having melted already. Refusing to identify himself, Barker became agitated and struck the officer with a metal-bladed snow shovel, knocking him from a porch and to the ground. Barker continued to assault the officer, who then shot and killed Barker.
2015-01-07	Andre Larone Murphy Sr. (42)	Black	Nebraska (Norfolk)	An officer responding to several 911 calls confronted Murphy at a motel. After a struggle, Murphy was arrested and later died while in police custody.
2015-01-07	Joseph Caffarello (31)	White	Illinois (Rosemont)	(Domestic disturbance) Caffarello was shot and killed by his brother-in-law, an off duty police officer, during a domestic incident.
2015-01-07	Nicholas Ryan Brickman (30)	White	Iowa (Des Moines)	(Police action) Brickman allegedly robbed a teller at gunpoint. He fled in his car, then stole an SUV at gunpoint. After hitting another vehicle, he attempted to escape on foot. When he pointed a gun at police officers, another officer shot and killed him.
2015-01-07	Ronald "Maynard" Sneed (31)	Black	Texas (Freeport)	(Domestic disturbance) Sneed reportedly kicked in the door to his girlfriends apartment. Responding to a call from the woman's son, police officers entered and confronted Sneed. When asked to show his hands, Sneed pointed a gun at his girlfriend and was shot and killed by the officers.
2015-01-07	Brock Nichols (35)	White	Kansas (Saline County)	(Police action) Deputies responded to a report of a woman fearing for the life of her 18-month-old son. Arriving at Nichols's (the boy's father) residence, the deputies found that Nichols had been drinking, in violation of a court order. Nichols asked to go to the bathroom and entered a dark room. After one of the deputies turned on a light, Nichols turned and pointed a handgun at the deputy. The deputy then shot Nichols, who was pronounced dead a short time later.
2015-01-07	Brian Pickett (26)	Black	California (Los Angeles)	(Domestic disturbance) Police responded to call from suspect's mother that he was under the influence and threatening her life. On seeing deputies he became "agitated and hostile". Officers used a taser to subdue him. He stopped breathing when paramedics arrived.
2015-01-07	Omarr Jackson (37)	Black	Louisiana (New Orleans)	Suspect allegedly fled after a traffic stop; gunfire was exchanged. Incident captured on officer's body camera.
2015-01-07	Hashim Hanif Ibn Abdul-Rasheed (41)	Black	Ohio (Columbus)	(Police action) At Port Columbus International Airport, Abdul-Rasheed was attempting to use a woman's identity to buy a plane ticket and was confronted by police. He then took out a knife and lunged at them. He was shot by one officer.
2015-01-06	Womack, Ned (47)		Georgia (Pickens County)	(Domestic disturbance) Police responding to domestic dispute call, upon arrival encountered a man in the yard who fired once, fled, returned, and fired again. A deputy returned fire. Suspect was airlifted to the hospital where he later died.
2015-01-06	Leslie Sapp III (47)	Black	Pennsylvania (Pittsburgh)	(Police action) Sapp pointed what turned out to be an airsoft gun at officers as they were attempting to serve him with a warrant on a sexual assault charge.
2015-01-06	Patrick Wayne Wetter (25)	White	California (Stockton)	(Police action) Police responded to a break-in at a group home. The suspect attacked a K9, stabbing it with a knife. He then raised the knife threateningly at officers, who fired, striking the suspect multiple times.
2015-01-06	Autumn Mae Steele (34)	White	Iowa (Burlington)	(Domestic disturbance) A police officer identified as Jesse Hill accidentally shot Autumn Steele fatally in the chest. It is still under investigation how this happened.
2015-01-05	McIlvain, Andrew (39)		Florida (Volusia County)	Motorcyclist Andrew McIlvain, a Navy Veteran and father of two, was critically injured after being struck by an officer's patrol car. He succumbed to his injuries two weeks later.
2015-01-05	Kenneth Arnold Buck (22)	Hispanic	Arizona (Chandler)	(Police action) Buck, a burglary suspect driving a stolen car, fired at pursuing police officers and was killed in the shootout.
2015-01-04	Kenneth Brown (18)	White	Oklahoma (Guthrie)	(Traffic stop) Brown was stopped by a trooper for driving without headlights. The trooper asked to search the car, Brown refused permission and was then patted down by the officer. During the search, the Highway Patrol trooper found a gun; allegedly the two struggled over the gun and Brown was then shot. He later died from his injuries.
2015-01-04	Michael Ray Rodriguez (39)	Hispanic	Colorado (Evans)	Responding to a report of a man with a gun, police confronted Rodriguez outside of a bar. Rodriguez refused to drop the weapon, instead raising it toward the officers. He was shot and killed.
2015-01-04	Matthew Joseph Hoffman (32)	White	California (San Francisco)	(Mental patient) (Suicide by cop) Hoffman attracted police attention by being in a parking lot reserved for law enforcement officers near the Mission police station. Hoffman drew a replica airsoft handgun from his waistband in the presence of responding officers, two of whom fired five times each, hitting Hoffman a total of three times. Police found an apologetic suicide note on Hoffman's cell phone.
2015-01-03	Kocher Jr., Michael (19)		Hawaii (Kauai)	(Pedestrian) Kocher was struck by a vehicle while walking down a highway. Police were called, and the responding officer struck Kocher with his car, killing him.
2015-01-03	Tim Elliott (53)	Asian	Washington (Shelton)	(Mental patient) Elliot was suicidal and shot himself. Deputies called to the scene confronted Elliot and subsequently shot and killed him.
2015-01-03	John Paul Quintero (23)	Hispanic	Kansas (Wichita)	(Drunk and disorderly) In 911 calls placed by his aunt, Quintero was said to have been possibly drunk or high and threatening his family with a knife. Police arriving at the scene found him and another family member in an SUV. After exiting the vehicle, he behaved belligerently and verbally threatened the officers. When he reportedly reached into his waistband he was Tasered, and then shot. He later died in the hospital. No weapon was recovered.
2015-01-02	Ajibade, Matthew (22)		Georgia (Savannah)	(Mental patient) Officers, responding to a domestic disturbance, found Ajibade holding a woman with a bruised face and bleeding nose under a blanket. He refused to release her and became combative when police arrested him. A woman, claiming to be his girlfriend, informed police of his mental health issues and gave them a bottle of his medication. During booking, he attacked and injured three officers and was put in a separate holding area. When officers checked on him later, they found that he had died. Nine Georgia sheriff's deputies were later dismissed after an internal investigation and a separate investigation by the Georgia Bureau of Investigation, though they have not as of yet been indicted or convicted for any offense and so retain the presumption of innocence for those purposes.
2015-01-02	Lewis Lee Lembke (47)	White	Oregon (Aloha)	(Domestic disturbance) Police, responding to a call about a woman being assaulted by her husband, shot and killed Lembke after he emerged from a back room and pointed a weapon at the officers.
2015-01-01	Roberto Fausto Ornelas (18)	Hispanic	Florida (Largo)	(Domestic disturbance) Officers responded to a call from Orenlas’ father that he was throwing things around their home and behaving erratically. Deputies forcibly removed the door to his bedroom and found him behaving strangely. Officers suspected he was under the influence of some narcotic. Officers attempted to restrain him but he broke free and they used a taser to subdue him. He continued to scream and fight medical personnel who attempted to treat him. He later died at Mariners Hospital.
2015-01-01	Gagne, Garrett (22)		Massachusetts (Chatham)	(Pedestrian) An officer, responding to an emergency, hit and killed Gagne around 4 a.m. as he was lying in the road after a night of drinking.

== See also ==
- Death in custody § United States
- Henry A. Wallace Police Crime Public Database
- List of cases of police brutality
- List of countries with annual rates and counts for killings by law enforcement officers
- List of law enforcement officers killed in the line of duty in the United States
- List of law enforcement officers convicted for an on-duty killing in the United States
- List of shootings by US immigration agents
- List of police reforms related to the George Floyd protests
- List of unarmed African Americans killed by law enforcement officers in the United States
- Lists of killings by law enforcement officers
- Police brutality in the United States
- Police misconduct § United States
- Police riot § United States
- Police use of deadly force in the United States
