= 2022 in Iowa =

- Decades: 2000s; 2010s; 2020s
- See also: History of Iowa; Historical outline of Iowa; List of years in Iowa; 2022 in the United States

The following is a list of events of the year 2022 in Iowa.

== Incumbents ==
=== State government ===
- Governor: Kim Reynolds (R)

== Events ==
Ongoing: COVID-19 pandemic in Iowa

- April 10 – Two people are killed and ten others hospitalized in a mass shooting in Cedar Rapids.
- July 22 – Maquoketa Caves State Park familicide: Three family members are killed at a campground in Maquoketa Caves State Park, with a fourth remaining unharmed. The park is subsequently closed, and the gunman is later found dead of a self-inflicted gunshot wound.
- November 8 – 2022 Iowa elections

== See also ==
- 2022 in the United States
