= 2021 in Iowa =

- Decades: 2000s; 2010s; 2020s
- See also: History of Iowa; Historical outline of Iowa; List of years in Iowa; 2021 in the United States

The following is a list of events of the year 2021 in Iowa.

== Incumbents ==
=== State government ===
- Governor: Kim Reynolds (R)

== Events ==
Ongoing: COVID-19 pandemic in Iowa

- The Iowa Heartlanders minor league ice hockey team are established.
- May 20 – Governor Reynolds signed the Vaccine Passport Ban Law which prohibited organizations or local governments from requiring individuals to show proof of receiving a COVID-19 vaccination and prevents state and local governments from issuing ID cards which would indicate an individual's vaccination status.
- December 1 – Des Moines based media conglomerate, Meredith Corporation, ceases operations.

== See also ==
- 2021 in the United States
