= 2011 in Iowa =

- Decades: 1990s; 2000s; 2010s; 2020s
- See also: History of Iowa; Historical outline of Iowa; List of years in Iowa; 2011 in the United States

The following is a list of events of the year 2011 in Iowa.

== Incumbents ==
=== State government ===
- Governor: Chet Culver (D) (January 1–14) Terry Branstad (R) (January 14 - December 31)

== Events ==
- January 14 - Terry Branstad becomes the governor of Iowa.
- February 20 - University of Iowa Wrestling wins the Big Ten title.
- April 9 - An EF3 tornado caused severe damage in Mapleton where over 100 homes and businesses were damaged or destroyed, and there were 14 injuries. Another EF4 tornado touched down in Pocahontas County where one house was flattened and swept off its foundation, and a combine, estimated at 30,000 pounds (14,000 kg), was tossed roughly 100 yards.
- June–August - 2011 Missouri River floods caused damage and closure of buildings and roads across eastern Iowa.
- October 30 - "Field of Dreams" property in Dyersville is sold to Go the Distance Baseball LLC.
- December 20 - Bob Vander Plaats leader of The Family Leader announces his endorsement of Rick Santorum for the 2012 Republican Party presidential primaries. Santorum would win the 2012 Iowa Republican presidential caucuses.

== See also ==
2011 in the United States
