= 2020 in Iowa =

- Decades: 2000s; 2010s; 2020s
- See also: History of Iowa; Historical outline of Iowa; List of years in Iowa; 2020 in the United States

The following is a list of events of the year 2020 in Iowa.

== Incumbents ==
=== State government ===
- Governor: Kim Reynolds (R)

== Events ==
- February 3 – Iowa caucuses: Pete Buttigieg wins the caucuses with 26.6% of state delegates and becomes the first openly gay person to ever earn the most delegates in a state's presidential contest
- March 8 – First COVID-19 cases in Iowa after a group of 3 people returned to the United States after a cruise in Egypt
- March 24 – First confirmed COVID-19 death in Iowa
- May 4 – Body of missing person Abdullahi "Abdi" Sharif found in the Des Moines River
- July 9 – The University of Iowa wins the 2020 Big Ten wrestling tournament.
- August 10 – Iowa derecho: Winds reached up to 140 mph causing damages to buildings, power outages and closures across the state. The 2020 derecho was one of the most expensive thunderstorms in United States history.

== See also ==
2020 in the United States
