= 2017 in Iowa =

- Decades: 1990s; 2000s; 2010s; 2020s
- See also: History of Iowa; Historical outline of Iowa; List of years in Iowa; 2017 in the United States

The following is a list of events of the year 2017 in Iowa.

== Incumbents ==
=== State government ===
- Governor: Terry Branstad (R) (January 1 - May 24), Kim Reynolds (R) (May 24 - December 31)

== Events ==
- March 23 - 15-year-old Jade Colvin was reported missing and later found murdered.
- May 24 - Kim Reynolds becomes the first female governor of Iowa.
- June 14–15 - A derecho affected central and eastern Iowa, causing widespread wind damage with gusts exceeding 80 mph.

== See also ==
2017 in the United States
