= 2014 in Iowa =

- Decades: 1990s; 2000s; 2010s; 2020s
- See also: History of Iowa; Historical outline of Iowa; List of years in Iowa; 2014 in the United States

The following is a list of events of the year 2014 in Iowa.

== Incumbents ==
=== State government ===
- Governor: Terry Branstad (R)

== Events ==
- March 16 - Iowa State Cyclones wrestling wins the Big 12 Conference championship.
- April 27 - An EF1 tornado touched down near Highland Center, traveling 46 miles from Wapello to Johnson Counties, killing two.
- September 10 - A man in Newton was trapped and rescued from a grain bin.
- September 26 - Police found the deceased body of Shao Tong in the trunk of a car in Iowa City, murdered by Li Xiangnan.
- November 4 - Joni Ernst wins the Iowa Senate seat and becomes the first woman senator from Iowa.
- November 14- Facebook opens a new data center in Altoona.

== See also ==
2014 in the United States
