= 2023 in Iowa =

- Decades: 2000s; 2010s; 2020s
- See also: History of Iowa; Historical outline of Iowa; List of years in Iowa; 2023 in the United States

The following is a list of events of the year 2023 in Iowa.

== Incumbents ==
=== State government ===
- Governor: Kim Reynolds (R)

== Events ==
- May 2 – Iowa Rampage, a professional arena football team based in Council Bluffs announce they're discontinuing operations after a single game.
- May 28 – An apartment building partially collapses in Davenport, killing three people.
- June 28 – Smoke from the wildfires in Canada reaches several U.S states, including Iowa.
- November 6 – Governor Kim Reynolds endorses Ron DeSantis for the 2024 Republican Party presidential primaries.
- November 21 – Bob Vander Plaats leader of The Family Leader announces his endorsement of Florida governor Ron DeSantis for the 2024 Republican Party presidential primaries.
- December – A Statue of Baphomet display in the Iowa State Capitol is destroyed by Michael Cassidy, a 35-year-old candidate for the Mississippi House of Representatives and a Christian conservative from Lauderdale, Mississippi.

== See also ==
- 2023 in the United States
