= 2016 in Iowa =

- Decades: 1990s; 2000s; 2010s; 2020s
- See also: History of Iowa; Historical outline of Iowa; List of years in Iowa; 2016 in the United States

The following is a list of events of the year 2016 in Iowa.

== Incumbents ==
=== State government ===
- Governor: Terry Branstad (R)

== Events ==
- February 1 - Iowa caucus: Hillary Clinton wins the democratic caucuses, Ted Cruz wins the republican caucuses.
- October 13 - The 2016 World Food Prize was awarded to Dr. Maria Andrade of Cape Verde, Dr. Robert Mwanga of Uganda, and Drs. Jan Low and Howarth Bouis of the United States, during a ceremony held at the Iowa State Capitol.

== See also ==
2016 in the United States
