= 2008 in Iowa =

- Decades: 1980s; 1990s; 2000s; 2010s; 2020s
- See also: History of Iowa; Historical outline of Iowa; List of years in Iowa; 2008 in the United States

The following is a list of events of the year 2008 in Iowa.

== Incumbents ==
=== State government ===
- Governor: Chet Culver (D)

== Events ==
- January 3 - Mike Huckabee wins the Iowa caucuses with 34.4% of the vote.
- March 23 - Steven Sueppel murdered his wife and 4 adopted children in his home in Iowa City. He later committed suicide by crashing his minivan into a concrete abutment.
- May 12 - A raid at the Agriprocessors, Inc., kosher slaughterhouse and meat packing plant in Postville, arresting 398 employees, 98% of whom were Latino.
- May 25 - An EF5 tornado touched down in Parkersburg, killing 9 and causing $100 million in damages.
- June 8 - July 1 - Iowa flood of 2008, caused major flooding in eastern Iowa, exceeding 6 billion dollars in damages.
- June 11 - An EF3 tornado hit a boys camp killing 4 and injuring 50 others.
- July 4 - The first 80/35 music festival takes place in Western Gateway Park.
- November 4 - Barack Obama wins the presidential election in Iowa.

== See also ==
2008 in the United States
