= 2012 in Iowa =

- Decades: 1990s; 2000s; 2010s; 2020s
- See also: History of Iowa; Historical outline of Iowa; List of years in Iowa; 2012 in the United States

The following is a list of events of the year 2012 in Iowa.

== Incumbents ==
=== State government ===
- Governor: Terry Branstad (R)

== Events ==
Ongoing: 2012 North American drought, meningitis outbreak

- January 3 - Rick Santorum wins the Iowa caucuses, beating Mitt Romney by only 34 votes.
- April 14 - An EF2 tornado touched down near Percival and began a 12 mile long track that went through Thurman, causing extensive home, vehicle, and tree damage, four semi- trucks were overturned and four truckers required hospitalization.
- November 6 - Barack Obama wins the Iowa presidential election.
- December 5 - The deceased bodies of Lyric Cook and Elizabeth Collins were found in Seven Bridges Wildlife Park in Bremer County.

== See also ==
2012 in the United States
