= 2007 in Iowa =

- Decades: 1980s; 1990s; 2000s; 2010s; 2020s
- See also: History of Iowa; Historical outline of Iowa; List of years in Iowa; 2007 in the United States

The following is a list of events of the year 2007 in Iowa.

== Incumbents ==
=== State government ===
- Governor: Tom Vilsack (D) (January 1–12) Chet Culver (D) (January 12 - December 31)

== Events ==
- May 30–31 - Evan M. O’Dorney, a 13 year old Iowan, wins the 2007 Scripps National Spelling Bee.
- June 1 - An EF2 tornado touched down near Grandview, traveling through Muscatine, causing 6 injuries and $2.7 million of damages.
- June 29 - American professional basketball team in the NBA G League Iowa Wolves is established.
- November 6 – Frank Cownie is reelected as mayor of Des Moines.

== See also ==
- 2007 in the United States
