= 2013 in Iowa =

- Decades: 1990s; 2000s; 2010s; 2020s
- See also: History of Iowa; Historical outline of Iowa; List of years in Iowa; 2013 in the United States

The following is a list of events of the year 2013 in Iowa.

== Incumbents ==
=== State government ===
- Governor: Terry Branstad (R)

== Events ==
- March 7–9 - Wayne Weng won the VII Iowa International Piano Competition that took place in Sioux City.
- June 7 - Kathlynn Shepard's deceased body was found in the Des Moines river near Ogden, murdered by Michael Klunder.
- June 12 - An EF3 Tornado touched down near Belmond and severely damaged several homes and businesses.
- December 14 - Terry Branstad breaks the national record for the longest tenure as governor.

== See also ==
2013 in the United States
