= 2019 in Iowa =

- Decades: 1990s; 2000s; 2010s; 2020s
- See also: History of Iowa; Historical outline of Iowa; List of years in Iowa; 2019 in the United States

The following is a list of events of the year 2019 in Iowa.

== Incumbents ==
=== State government ===
- Governor: Kim Reynolds (R)

== Events ==
- March 9–12 - midwestern u.s floods: Nearly 40 counties in Iowa declared an emergency and one person died due to flood waters
- March 17 - Des Moines Water Works lawsuit dismissed
- May 1 - Governor Kim Reynolds signed legislation to establish Iowa’s first children’s mental health system
- May 22 - An EF2 tornado touched down southeast of Adair, killing 1 and injuring another

== See also ==
2019 in the United States
