= 2025 in Iowa =

- Decades: 2000s; 2010s; 2020s
- See also: History of Iowa; Historical outline of Iowa; List of years in Iowa; 2025 in the United States

The following is a list of events of the year 2025 in Iowa.

== Incumbents ==
=== State government ===
- Governor: Kim Reynolds (R)

== Events ==
- January 28 – 2025 Iowa Senate District 35 special election: In an upset, Democrat Mike Zimmer beats Republican Katie Whittington to win the seat held by Chris Cournoyer, who was appointed Lieutenant Governor.
- February 28 – Governor Kim Reynolds signs Senate File 418, which eliminates gender identity as a protected class from the Iowa Civil Rights Act. This makes Iowa the first U.S. state to remove gender identity as a protected class from a civil rights law.
- March 11 – 2025 Iowa House of Representatives District 100 special election: Republican Blaine Watkins beats Democrat Nannette Griffin to win the seat held by Martin Graber, who died in January.
- March 25 – The Dordt University Defenders win the 2025 NAIA women's basketball tournament, beating the Indiana Wesleyan Wildcats 82–73. The win is Dordt's second tournament win in a row.
- April 11 – Governor Kim Reynolds announces she will not seek reelection in 2026.
- May 23 – 2025 Southwest United States measles outbreak: The Iowa Department of Health and Human Services confirms the state's first measles case of 2025.
- June 5 — Iowa's only seat on the DNC's Rules and Bylaws Committee, which determines the order of states in the presidential nominating process, is removed, and New Hampshire is awarded a second seat on the committee.
- June 12–13 — Police and child welfare officials remove 88 minors from a Columbus Junction youth Bible camp for Chin refugees.
- September 26 – Des Moines Public Schools Superintendent Ian Roberts is detained by ICE.

== See also ==
- 2025 in the United States
