= 2018 in Iowa =

- Decades: 1990s; 2000s; 2010s; 2020s
- See also: History of Iowa; Historical outline of Iowa; List of years in Iowa; 2018 in the United States

The following is a list of events of the year 2018 in Iowa.

== Incumbents ==
=== State government ===
- Governor: Kim Reynolds (R)

== Events ==
- June 31-July 1 - Des Moines flooding: flooding caused the sewer system to become overwhelmed, causing flash flooding in many neighbourhoods, also leading to the death of sports radio personality, Larry Cotlar.
- July 19–20 - 32 confirmed tornadoes touched down east and southeast of Des Moines causing damage to Pella, Marshalltown, and the surrounding areas.
- August 21 - The body of missing person Mollie Tibbetts was found in a cornfield in Poweshiek County, murdered by Cristhian Bahena Rivera.

== See also ==
2018 in the United States
