= 2024 in Iowa =

- Decades: 2000s; 2010s; 2020s
- See also: History of Iowa; Historical outline of Iowa; List of years in Iowa; 2024 in the United States

The following is a list of events of the year 2024 in Iowa.

== Incumbents ==
=== State government ===
- Governor: Kim Reynolds (R)

== Events ==
- January 4 – Perry High School shooting: Three people are killed (including the perpetrator) and six others are injured during a mass school shooting in Perry.
- January 15 – 2024 Iowa Republican presidential caucuses: Former president Donald Trump wins the Iowa caucus. Vivek Ramaswamy drops out of the race and endorses Trump.
- February 15 – In US women's college basketball, Iowa's Caitlin Clark becomes the career scoring leader in NCAA Division I, surpassing the record previously held by current WNBA and former Washington star Kelsey Plum during Iowa's 106–89 win over Michigan.
- March 5 – The Democratic Party holds presidential nominating contests in Iowa amongst other states.
- April 26 – Tornado outbreak sequence of April 25–28, 2024 –
  - A tornado outbreak in areas near Omaha, leads to the issuance of multiple tornado emergencies across the states of Nebraska and Iowa.
  - A Doppler on Wheels unit records wind speeds of 224 miles / 360 kilometers per hour in a tornado near Harlan, the strongest recorded by a mobile weather radar since the 2013 El Reno tornado, equivalent to EF-5 intensity on the Enhanced Fujita scale.
- May 21 – At least five people are killed and 35 are injured as a strong tornado devastates the town of Greenfield. A Doppler on Wheels unit records a wind gust of between 250 mph (400 km/h) and 290 mph (470 km/h) over Greenfield, the strongest winds recorded inside a tornado by a mobile weather radar since the 2013 El Reno tornado, equivalent to EF5 intensity on the Enhanced Fujita scale.
- June 10 – Four instructors from Cornell College and one Chinese passerby are wounded in a stabbing attack at a park in Jilin City, China. The perpetrator is arrested a day later.
- June 22 – A University of Illinois team led by Joshua Wurman and Karen Kosiba confirms mobile radar measurements of between 309 mph (497 km/h) and 318 mph (512 km/h) in the tornado that struck Greenfield on May 21. This is the first unambiguous radar confirmation of tornado winds over 300 mph (480 km/h).
- November 5 - Donald Trump wins the presidential election in Iowa, beating Kamala Harris by 219,741 votes.

== See also ==
- 2024 in the United States
