= 2009 in Iowa =

- Decades: 1980s; 1990s; 2000s; 2010s; 2020s
- See also: History of Iowa; Historical outline of Iowa; List of years in Iowa; 2009 in the United States

The following is a list of events of the year 2009 in Iowa.

== Incumbents ==
=== State government ===
- Governor: Chet Culver (D)

== Events ==
- April 3 - Iowa legalizes same-sex marriage and becomes the third state to do so.
- September 27 - Pappajohn Sculpture Park opens in Des Moines.
- December 31 - The Iowa State Cyclones football team defeated the Minnesota Golden Gophers, winning the Insight Bowl.

== See also ==
2009 in the United States
