= 2010 in Iowa =

- Decades: 1990s; 2000s; 2010s; 2020s
- See also: History of Iowa; Historical outline of Iowa; List of years in Iowa; 2010 in the United States

The following is a list of events of the year 2010 in Iowa.

== Incumbents ==
=== State government ===
- Governor: Chet Culver (D)

== Events ==
- January 5 - The Iowa Hawkeyes win the Orange Bowl, beating Georgia Tech 24–14.
- March 20 - University of Iowa wrestling wins the NCAA championship.
- June 25 - An EF4 tornado touched down 3 miles west of Little Rock, causing extensive damage to the areas near Little Rock and Sibley.
- July 24 - Heavy rains caused the Lake Delhi Dam to fail with damage exceeding 1 million dollars.

== See also ==
2010 in the United States
