= 2005 in Iowa =

- Decades: 1980s; 1990s; 2000s; 2010s; 2020s
- See also: History of Iowa; Historical outline of Iowa; List of years in Iowa; 2005 in the United States

The following is a list of events of the year 2005 in Iowa.

== Incumbents ==
=== State government ===
- Governor: Tom Vilsack (D)

== Events ==
- March 11 - Jason Gage was murdered in his home in Waterloo, and was compared by the press to the killing of Matthew Shepard and pushed citywide laws protecting LGBT people.
- June 19 - The Davenport Skybridge was opened to the public in Davenport.
- July 1 - Wells Fargo Arena is opened to the public and holds its first event: Tony Hawk's Boom-Boom Huck Jam.
- November 12–13 - A tornado outbreak hit central Iowa, killing one and injuring 7, causing $18.607 million in damages.

== See also ==
2005 in the United States
