= 2006 in Iowa =

- Decades: 1980s; 1990s; 2000s; 2010s; 2020s
- See also: History of Iowa; Historical outline of Iowa; List of years in Iowa; 2006 in the United States

== Incumbents ==
=== State government ===
- Governor: Tom Vilsack (D)

== Events ==
- April 13 - An EF2 tornado touched down in Iowa City, destroying many buildings and businesses in the area.

== See also ==
- 2006 in the United States
