= The Marriage Vow =

Political pledge created by Bob Vander Plaats

The Marriage Vow or "The Marriage Vow - A Declaration of Dependence Upon Marriage and Family" is a political pledge created by Bob Vander Plaats, a former candidate for Iowa governor, and the Iowa-based conservative group; The Family Leader, a public advocacy organization affiliated with the Iowa Family Policy Center, that he heads. Signing the pledge, created in early July, was a requirement to receive any support from the organization. Signing the pledge entailed supporting a monogamous heterosexual definition of marriage, as well as backing a ban on pornography, abortion, and Sharia Law. Notable signees include Michele Bachmann and Rick Santorum, while the pledge drew notable criticism from libertarian candidate Gary Johnson.

== Contents ==
The vow begins with a series of preambles, each designed to show the "great crisis" in the institution of marriage. Later, the first preamble, one that claimed that children of slaves were more likely to live in 2 parent households than children are today, was redacted due to the criticism it received. The following are the vows the candidates pledged to by signing.

- Personal fidelity to their spouse
- Respect for the marital bonds of others
- Fidelity to the US constitution
- Support for "faithful constitutionalists" as judges
- Opposition to any redefinition of marriage that falls outside of heterosexual monogamous relationships
- "Recognition of the overwhelming statistical evidence that married people enjoy better health, better sex, longer lives, greater financial stability, and that children raised by a mother and a father together experience better learning, less addiction, less legal trouble, and less extramarital pregnancy"
- Reform of anti marriage portions of welfare policy
- Extended "cooling off" periods for those seeking a divorce
- Legal advocacy for the Defense of Marriage Act
- Support for a federal marriage amendment to the US constitution defining marriage as between one man and one woman
- Opposition to human trafficking, sexual slavery, prostitution,
- Prevention of seduction into promiscuity
- Opposition to pornography. Although Plaats later clarified that the pledge just intended to prevent women from being coerced into pornography.
- Opposition to abortion and infanticide
- Supporting safeguards to prevent sexual abuse in the military
- Opposition to women serving in active combat roles in the military
- Rejection of Sharia Islam
- Rejection of all forms of anti-women totalitarian control
- Recognition that childbearing is beneficial to "U.S. demographic, economic, strategic and actuarial health and security."
- Commitment to downsizing the government
- Defense of religious liberty and freedom of speech.

== Response ==
=== Criticism ===
==== Claims of racism ====
One of the preambles to the pledge, drew massive amounts of criticism for claiming that children of slaves were more likely to live in a 2 parent household. "Slavery had a disastrous impact on African-American families, yet sadly a child born into slavery in 1860 was more likely to be raised by his mother and father in a two-parent household than was an African-American baby born after the election of the USA's first African-American President." Several days later, Plaats sent out an email clarifying that "Our critics are distorting the facts and misrepresenting The Marriage Vow. The preamble to the vow references relevant and sobering data which points to marriages and families being in crisis. The FAMiLY LEADER has never made the claim, nor ever will, that slavery was better for families." The preamble was later removed from the pledge.

==== Gary Johnson ====
On July 19, Gary Johnson published an article in the Huffington Post criticizing The Marriage Vow. He claimed that the pledge endorsed government intervention into the personal lives of citizens, while criticizing the discriminatory language of the pledge. He went on to state that Pledge's focus on social issues redirected attention from areas like the economy.

==== Other criticisms ====
House Speaker Pro-Tem Jeff Kaufmann said the pledge had "ridiculous implications", refused to sign, and told Plaats that his "integrity is in question" and "political credibility is waning to the point of no impact."

Former Iowa State Senator Jeff Angelo said "This pledge is an attempt to shut down dialogue between voters and the people vying to represent them.".

Presidential candidate Mitt Romney called the pledge "undignified and inappropriate." Romney's campaign later clarified that he would not sign because the preamble suggesting children of slaves were better off than today.

=== Notable signatures ===
The 2 most notable signatures came from Rick Santorum and Michele Bachmann. Rick Santorum was the first presidential candidate to contact The Family Leader after the organization publicly announced the pledge. Michele Bachmann also contacted The Family Leader to sign the pledge, and became the first Candidate to send her signed document to the organization. Although Newt Gingrich did not sign the pledge, he wrote a lengthy letter in which he upheld many of the principles of the pledge including personal fidelity to his wife, respecting the marital bonds of others, enforcing the defense of marriage act, to support a federal marriage amendment, and to oppose any definition of marriage outside of "one man and one woman." The pledge was also signed by former Texas governor Rick Perry.
