= Killing of Autumn Steele =

2015 police shooting in Burlington, Iowa

Shooting of Autumn Steele
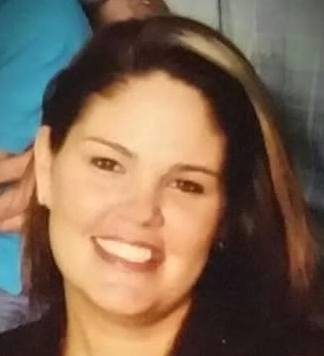
- A photograph of Autumn Steele
- Date: January 6, 2015
- Time: ~10:25 a.m.
- Location: 104 S. Garfield Avenue, Burlington, Iowa, U.S.; 40°48′35″N 91°07′08″W
- Filmed by: Police body and dash cameras
- Participants: Autumn Steele (fatality); Jesse Hill (police officer)
- Outcome: Settled out of court (2 million dollars estimated)
- Deaths: Autumn Mae Steele

On January 6, 2015, Autumn Steele, a 34-year-old woman, was fatally shot outside her home in Burlington, Iowa by police officer Jesse Hill, during a response to a domestic disturbance call. In June 2018, a civil lawsuit was settled between the City of Burlington and the Steele family over her death.

== Shooting ==
On January 6, 2015, Officer Jesse Hill was dispatched to the Steele home in response to a domestic disturbance call. Police said when Hill arrived, Autumn was screaming at and attacking her husband Gabriel (who was holding their young child). Hill said the family dog bit him as he was trying to protect the husband and child. He said he tried shooting the dog twice, but he slipped. One of his bullets hit Autumn Steele in her torso; she later died of her injuries. A neighbor told a local newspaper the officer was trying to break up the Steeles' argument and was startled by the couple's dog. The Steeles' German Shepherd was confiscated by the police under a search warrant and was placed in the city's dog pound for observation. The dog was later deemed "not vicious" and returned. Officer Hill was treated for at least one dog bite.

== Legal proceedings ==
On February 27, 2015, Des Moines County Attorney Amy Beavers provided a 7-page letter to the Iowa Department of Criminal Investigations stating that she would not prosecute Hill under manslaughter charges. The Associated Press reported that Beavers said her decision was supported by body camera evidence, witness statements, and reports from the Iowa Division of Criminal Investigation. Hill had to make an instantaneous decision as the threat was occurring, Beavers said. Adam J. Klein, an attorney who represents Steele's 7-year-old son, said in a news release that Beavers' statement made it appear she reached her "determination by simply ignoring Iowa law".

In June 2015, Iowa Senator Chuck Grassley requested Nicholas Klinefeldt, the U.S. attorney for the Southern District of Iowa, to consider a federal investigation into the shooting. A spokesperson from the office neither confirmed nor denied the existence of the ongoing investigation into the matter.

In December 2015, the Steele family and transparency-advocacy groups pushed for all body-camera footage related to the incident to be released, including by pursuing legal action. That same month, bomb threats were made to Burlington City Council members, which police said were linked to the shooting. However, investigative records to the threats were never disclosed and the perpetrator involved has yet to be arrested.

In 2016, Des Moines County Attorney Beavers was found by the Iowa Public Information Board to have violated the Open Records Law after giving conflicting statements of accounts. She agreed to settle with the board to pay a $200 fine in exchange in not having to admit guilt.

On November 16, 2016, a lawsuit was filed by the family of Steele against the City of Burlington and Officer Hill in response to the shooting.

Attorneys representing the City of Burlington and the Burlington Police Department filed an appeal to dismiss the open records violation case against them in January 2017. Administrative Law Judge Karen Doland dismissed the appeal exclaiming that the case has merit and should be ruled. The hearing was going to be held on April 19, but was postponed. Instead, another pretrial conference would be held that day. It was determined from the pretrial conference that the hearing will be set on August 29. However, several claims were dismissed in the lawsuit due to U.S. District Judge James E. Gritzner granting approval for City of Burlington's attorneys but denied dropping the suit entirely.

On July 20, 2017, the Iowa Public Information Board voted in favor to file an administrative contest against the Iowa Department of Criminal Investigation and the Burlington Police Department. This came to a response to the two parties requesting the board for an "interlocutory" review on the grounds that inventory of the records were not relevant to the state's open records laws. The administrative trial could begin as early as August 17 but could be delayed due to that recent vote.

During a deposition hearing in May 2018, an attorney representing the Steele family proclaimed that Officer Hill never made any complaints of injuries in the unedited footage. It was argued that Hill contradicted from what he had provided to a report to what was happening on video. On June 6, 2018, a settlement was reached between the city and the Steele family. When the Burlington City Manager was asked if the suit would have a financial impact on the city's insurance or its future contracts long-term, he was not certain. Following the suit, public watchdog group Iowa Freedom of Information Council filed a motion to request a federal judge to release records in full and to intervene in the case.

On September 12, 2018, the body cam video of the incident was released. During the video, Hill said to his partner "Oh, my God, no! Oh, fuck, Tim! Shit, Tim! I'm fucking going to prison, Tim!"

On October 5, 2018, Doland issued her ruling stating that the 9-1-1 tape, body camera videos, and dash camera records is considered public records as originally outlined by the Iowa Supreme Court.

On February 21, 2019, the Iowa Public Information Board voted 6–2 to reject complaints against the Iowa Division of Criminal Investigation and the Burlington Police Department in regards to breaking Iowa Open Record laws with refusing to disclose investigative records.

On March 25, 2019, the ACLU of Iowa filed an appeal and lawsuit against the Iowa Public Information Board in regards to its ruling in February 2019. The ACLU requested for 9-1-1 calls and videos be part of a records request as requirement for Iowa Open Records laws. They have also petitioned to only keep the records confidential if its an ongoing investigation. The organization filed in behalf of the family's attorney Adam Klein.
