= COVID-19 pandemic in Iowa =

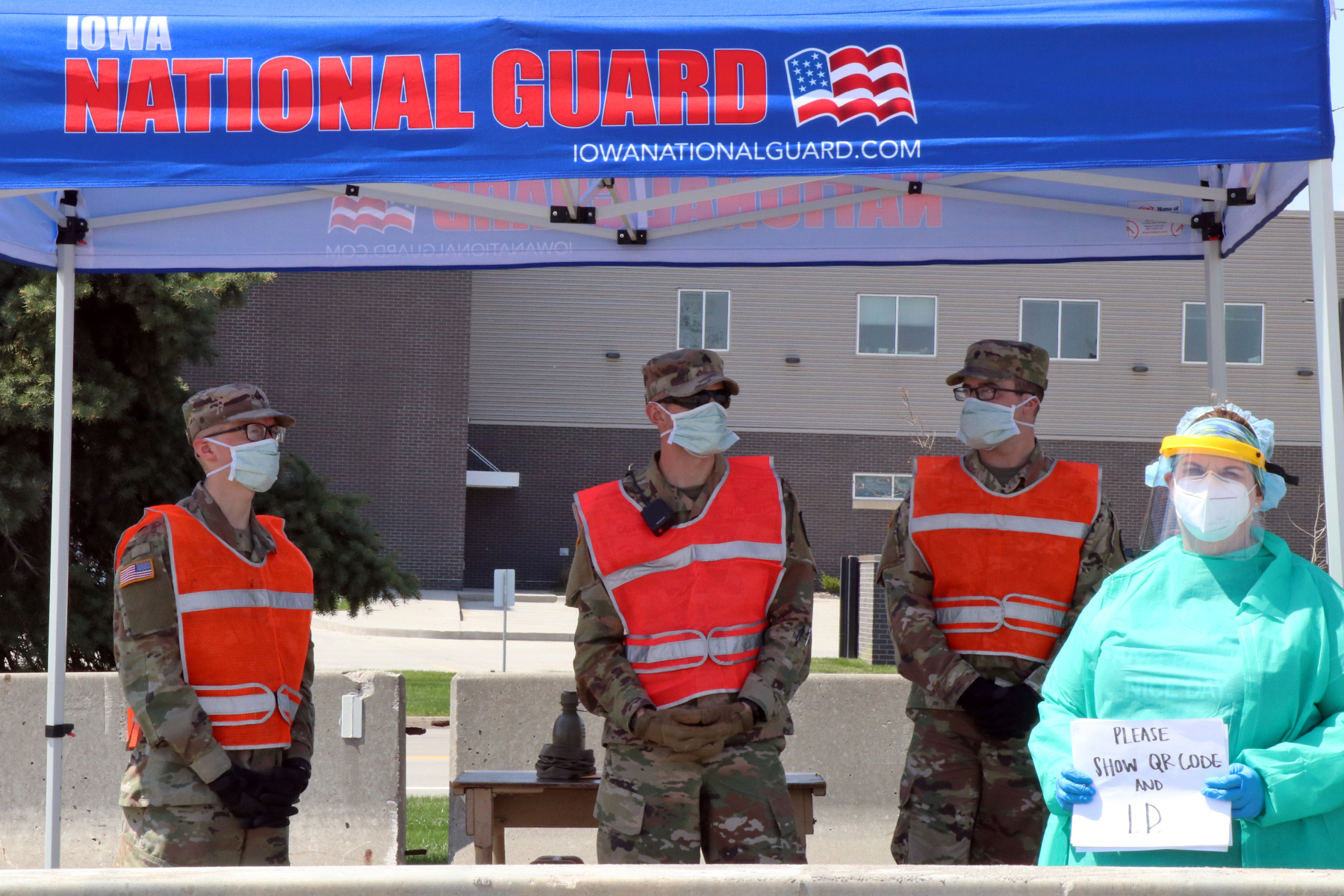
- Drive-through testing site at the Iowa Events Center in Des Moines
- Disease: COVID-19
- Pathogen: SARS-CoV-2
- Location: Iowa, U.S.
- Index case: Iowa City
- Arrival date: March 8, 2020 (6 years, 7 months, 2 weeks and 6 days)
- Confirmed cases: 49,164
- Hospitalized cases: 203 (current)
- Critical cases: 77 (current)
- Ventilator cases: 47 (current)
- Recovered: 14,383
- Deaths: 5,067

Government website
- Iowa Department of Public Health

The COVID-19 pandemic was confirmed to have reached the U.S. state of Iowa in March 2020. The first known cases were three individuals who had traveled on a cruise in Egypt before returning home to Johnson County on March 3. Initially, case clusters were focused at meatpacking plants and congregate care facilities. By late October, community spread had become a concern, and some areas of the state had reported over 20% test positivity. A headline stated that "Iowa hospitals fear overwhelming patient surge if coronavirus cases continue to climb."

== Timeline ==
=== March 2020 ===
- March 8 – The first confirmed COVID-19 cases in Iowa were announced — three individuals who had traveled on a cruise in Egypt before returning home to Johnson County on March 3.
- March 9 – Governor Kim Reynolds signed a Proclamation of Disaster Emergency.
- March 15 – Governor Reynolds recommended closing schools for four weeks. The state worked on developing legislation to provide child care during the emergency, including food for low-income students. The total number of confirmed coronavirus infections in the state increased to 22.
- March 25 – Number of cases in Iowa reached 145, and one fatality reported in Dubuque County.
- March 26 – Governor expanded upon previous COVID-19 disaster proclamations to halt non-essential surgeries, and non-emergency dental appointments.
- March 27 – Governor's office asserted: "[The] Proclamation suspends all nonessential or elective surgeries and procedures until April 16th, that includes surgical abortion procedures".
- March 29 – Number of cases in Iowa reached 336, and a fourth fatality reported in Linn County.

=== April 2020 ===
- April 1 – Number of cases reached 549, and the number of fatalities reached 9.
- April 2 – Governor Reynolds ordered schools to remain closed through the end of April.
- April 4 – Number of cases reached 786, and the number of fatalities reached 14.
- April 9 – The Iowa Department of Public Health (IDPH) has been notified of 125 additional positive cases for a total of 1,270 positive cases. There have been an additional 882 negative tests for a total of 13,703 negative tests to date, which includes testing reported by the State Hygienic Lab and other labs.
- April 10 – As of April 10, there were 14,565 negative COVID-19 test results reported by the State Hygienic Lab and other labs, and a total of 1,388 positive cases. Members of the White House including Jared Kushner, Kellyanne Conway, Joseph Grogan, Dr. Deborah Birx, Dr. Anthony Fauci and other White House coronavirus task force members receive from Robert Redfield the Centers for Disease Control (CDC) guidance documents and decision trees to re-open communities, however, the CDC guidance and decision trees for communities including meat packers was rejected for the White House's "Opening Up America Again Plan" that is later released in early May.
- April 17 – Governor Kim Reynolds announced that Iowa schools remain closed for the remainder of the school year.
- April 20 – As of April 20, there were 22,661 negative COVID-19 test results reported by the State Hygienic Lab and other labs, and a total of 3,159 positive cases, with 79 deaths attributed to COVID-19.
- April 23 - Sheriff Tony Thompson of Black Hawk County went on the Rachel Maddow Show to describe his frustration with health conditions at a Tyson meat plant.
- April 27 – Governor Reynolds announced that 77 counties will remove some business restrictions on May 1 while the counties of Polk, Dallas, Black Hawk, Linn, Louisa, Tama, Johnson, Bremer, Benton, Allamakee, Dubuque, Fayette, Marshall, Jasper, Iowa, Poweshiek, Scott, Washington, Muscatine, Henry, Des Moines, and Woodbury will maintain full business restrictions until May 15 because they were hard hit with infections.

=== May 2020 ===
- Early May - More than 1,000 of 2,800 workers at Tyson Foods' largest pork processing plant, in Waterloo, tested positive for the virus or antibodies, and at least 5 workers died. An additional 951 workers at the Columbus Junction and Perry plants tested positive. Safety inspectors had declined to inspect the Perry plant.
- May 6 – Hy-Vee began limiting meat purchases to four packages. Reynolds met with US President Donald Trump at the White House to discuss the COVID-19 pandemic and her response.
- May 7 – As of May 7, there were a total of 11,059 positive cases, with 231 deaths attributed to COVID-19.
- May 13 – Governor Reynolds announced that reopenings of restaurants, libraries, and fitness centers will be extended to the entire state, and also include barbershops, tattoo parlors, massage therapists, and salons, as of May 15.
- May 14 – As of May 14, there were a total of 13,675 positive cases, with 318 deaths attributed to COVID-19.
- May 28 – As of May 28, there were a total of 18,502 positive cases, with 500 deaths attributed to COVID-19.

=== June 2020 ===
- June 13 – For the first time since early April, no COVID-19-related deaths were reported.
- June 14 – As of June 14, there were a total of 23,879 positive cases, with 651 deaths attributed to COVID-19.
- June 23 – Some bars and restaurants in the Des Moines area, and in the college towns of Ames and Iowa City closed due to increases in cases.

=== July 2020 ===
- July 22 - One of the first outbreaks at a meatpacking plant, in early April, was much more severe than initial reports indicated. Officials at the Tyson Foods pork processing plant in Columbus Junction told inspectors that 522 employees were infected; however, the Iowa Department of Public Health publicly confirmed only 221 cases in its May 5 news conference.

=== August 2020 ===
- August 7 – Vacation destination Dickinson County, home to Lake Okoboji and the Iowa Great Lakes region, had 377 cases, up from only 8 on Memorial Day. Mask wearing was unpopular among local residents.
- August 17 – The Iowa Department of Public Health website admits to an ongoing "software error that artificially lowers the number of new confirmed cases."
- August 18 – Drake University sent 14 students home for violating guidelines on on-campus and off-campus gatherings.
- August 19 – Inmate transfers from county jails into the state prison system were suspended temporarily due to cases among 59 inmates and 6 staff members the state's intake center, the Iowa Medical and Classification Center in Coralville.
- August 23 – The White House urged Iowans to be required by mandatory order to wear face masks statewide; however, Governor Reynolds resisted issuing a mandatory order which would be unenforceable saying that Iowans should do the right thing and voluntarily wear face masks. Previously, Reynolds barred local ordinances in Iowa from issuing a mandatory mask requirement.
- August 24 – The University of Iowa had 111 cases.
- August 25 – Johnson County had positivity rates over 30% for the third day in a row.
- August 27 – Iowa had a positivity rate during the last 24 hours of over 18%. Governor Reynolds ordered bars, breweries, and nightclubs closed in six highly populated counties: Black Hawk, Linn, Johnson, Story, Polk, and Dallas until September 20 due to Iowa having the highest rate of increase in positive coronavirus cases in the United States. In Iowa, if an establishment, including breweries, tasting rooms for wineries and distilleries, pubs, taverns, bars, and nightclubs, which "prepares and serves food, the sale of which results in at least half of the establishment's monthly revenues, may reopen or remain open" as a restaurant following approval from either a local food licensing authority or the state's Department of Inspection and Appeals; however, alcohol sales must end at 10 pm, bars in venues such as theaters and casinos must close, and since late June 2020, carry out cocktails are allowed.
- August 28 - Iowa's test positivity rate "jumped to a record 79.43 percent for the preceding 24 hours", as antigen tests were added to state totals.
- August 31 - The White House announced that Iowa had the highest rate of positive coronavirus cases in United States. The New York Times listed both Ames and Iowa City as the United States' worst metro hotspots per capita at 8.2 cases and 7.6 cases per 1,000 over the last two weeks and both are in the top four metro areas in the United States with the highest rates of increase over the last two weeks. 28 Iowa counties, including Polk, Johnson and Story, were listed as "red zones." In an August 30 report released on August 31, The White House again called for a mandatory mask requirement for Iowa because Iowa has the fifth from highest positivity rate in the United States and highest number of new cases per capita in the United States at 232 per 100,000 which is much higher than the national average of 88 per 100,000.

=== September 2020 ===
- September 2 - A news story stated that "nearly half of an Iowa National Guard battalion that came to train at Camp Ripley in Minnesota this summer became sick with or were exposed to COVID-19." During an evening stop in Black Hawk County in Iowa, Senator Joni Ernst stated that she is "so skeptical" of the official coronavirus numbers and deaths alleging hospitals and physicians of inflating COVID related information to gain more money through reimbursements.
- September 3 – Surgeon General Jerome Adams stated that he agreed with Governor Reynolds not issuing a mandatory order to wear face masks statewide in public "... because people in the Midwest are going to do the right thing" and that the recent spike is only in the 18-25 age group with all other age groups have lowering numbers of positive cases in Iowa.
- September 3 – At least 107 schools in the state had reported cases.
- September 4 – Iowa had a positivity rate during the last 24 hours of over 15%.
- September 7 – The scope of the outbreak among the Iowa National Guard unit in Minnesota had been "misstated," according to the commander of Camp Ripley. He said fewer than 60 out of 500 soldiers were sent home, principally due to exposure risks, rather than as active cases.
- September 12 - Iowa had a positivity rate during the last 24 hours of over 14%, had 425 ICU beds available and 744 ventilators (76.64%) available, and had 90 COVID-19 patients in ICU with 35 COVID-19 patients on a ventilator.
- September 16 - Bars and nightclubs reopen at 5 pm in Black Hawk, Linn, Polk, and Dallas counties but Story and Johnson county bars remain closed until Sunday September 20.
- September 19 - Iowa had a positivity rate during the last 24 hours of almost 15%, had 409 ICU beds available and 778 ventilators (80.21%) available, and had 76 COVID-19 patients in ICU with 38 COVID-19 patients on a ventilator.
- September 26 - Sixteen counties reported a positivity rate greater than 15% over the previous 14 days.
- September 29 - The hospitalization rate increased, with 61 new admissions of virus patients in 24 hours, for a total of 390 virus hospitalizations. 100 patients were the ICU, with 31 on ventilators. There were 18 deaths.

=== October 2020 ===
- October 5 – Two staff members tested positive at Scott Community College Belmont Campus, and the school announced it would close until October 12.
- October 5 – The Globe Gazette reported that "The worst of the COVID-19 pandemic in Iowa appears to have moved from college campuses to more rural pockets, particularly in northwest Iowa." Lyon County had a two-week average positive case rate of 31.5%.
- October 6 – Restrictions were lifted in Johnson and Story County, the last two counties impacted by a five-week bar closure. On-campus cases at universities had dropped. The University of Iowa reported six new cases, for a total of 2,011 among students, and 48 among employees since Aug. 18. Iowa State reported 53 new cases September 28 and October 4, for a total of 1,754 cases since August 1.
- On October 9, the Ames Haunted Forest announced it would close for the first time in 20 years, due to COVID-19 and the derecho. Half of the college-age actors for the event were reluctant to confirm participation.
- An October 10 article in the Omaha World-Herald noted that both Iowa and Nebraska were in the top 15 states for cases, but Iowa had seen 72% more deaths, 1,441 compared with 514 in Nebraska. This was attributed to Iowa having a higher percentage of elderly people, and three times more outbreaks in long-term care homes.
- On October 12, Iowa cases had broken the 100,000 mark. The nature of the outbreak had changed, from a "cluster of nursing home and meatpacking plant outbreaks early on to 47% of positive cases now in the 18 to 40 age group." State Medical Director and Epidemiologist Dr. Caitlin Pedati said "What we have seen is what we would call more of a community activity, or community spread, of this virus in some areas."
- October 14 - A campaign rally by President Trump at Des Moines International Airport was attended by thousands of supporters. Des Moines Mayor Frank Cownie urged attendees to wear masks. Rally organizers played a Phil Collins hit, "In the Air Tonight", and few attendees wore masks. A nonprofit, Rural America 2020, sponsored a red-and-white billboard near the event which featured a big arrow pointing towards the airport and the words "Trump Covid Superspreader Event."
- On October 20, a nursing home in Amana reported that 36 of 42 residents, and 25 staff tested positive.
- On October 22, 70 long-term care facilities in the state had reported cases, including 779 deaths. Rural areas throughout the Midwest were experiencing a surge, and in Iowa's rural Carroll County, about 20% of tests were positive.
- On October 22, a researcher at the University of Iowa reported that nine patients were involved in a clinical study of Regeneron, the drug used on President Trump. Results for efficacy and safety were not expected for some months.
- On October 23, one headline stated that "Iowa hospitals fear overwhelming patient surge if coronavirus cases continue to climb."

=== November 2020 ===
- On November 9, the Iowa Department of Corrections reported COVID-19 outbreaks at Iowa prisons in three areas. At prisons in Clarinda, there were positive cases in 377 inmates and 16 staff members, and in Rockwell City, there were positive cases in 254 inmates and four staff members. At Anamosa prison, there were 485 infected inmates and 50 infected staff members.
- On November 10, Governor Reynolds issued a proclamation that, among other things, "prohibit[ed] all social, community, recreational, leisure or sporting gathering with more than 25 people indoors or 100 people outdoors unless all people over the age of 2 wear masks" and required that "[a]ll events of over 10 people must ensure 6 feet of social distancing between groups." The proclamation stated that all employers "shall evaluate whether any more of their employees can feasibly work remotely and to the extent feasible, shall take steps to enable such employees to work from home." Subsequent paragraphs called for businesses remaining open to take precautions "including appropriate employee screening, social distancing practices, and increased cleaning and hygiene practices;" yet stated that that section shall not be used for enforcement. The proclamation was to come into effect after midnight the next day, and last through November 30.

=== May 2021 ===
- On May 20, 2021, at the close of the 89th Iowa General Assembly, Governor Reynolds signed into law the Vaccine Passport Ban Law which prohibited organizations or local governments from requiring individuals to show proof of receiving a COVID-19 vaccination and prevents state and local governments from issuing ID cards which would indicate an individual's vaccination status. The law took effect immediately. Earlier in May 2021 and based on new guidance from the Centers for Disease Control and Prevention as well as the Iowa Department of Public Health, Governor Reynolds signed into law a ban on school districts and local and county governments from requiring masks worn on public property if the individual is fully vaccinated. This law took effect on May 20, 2021.

=== September 2021 ===
- On September 27, 2021, Federal Judge Robert Pratt issued a temporary order, which overturned the ban on mask mandates for school districts (Iowa Code section 280.31), barring Governor Reynolds and Iowa Department of Education Director Ann Lebo from enforcing the Iowa law banning mask mandates for school districts. Judge Pratt's temporary order will remain in effect until the court issues an order for a preliminary injunction.
- On September 29, 2021, 6,563 Iowans had died from COVID-19 since the COVID-19 pandemic began. Currently, 624 were hospitalized with 157 in ICUs and 81.2% of COVID-19 hospitalizations were unvaccinated Iowans. During the last week, 1,300 people tested positive every day for COVID-19 in the state with a 9.5% average positivity rate for the state of Iowa over the last 14 days.

== Government response ==
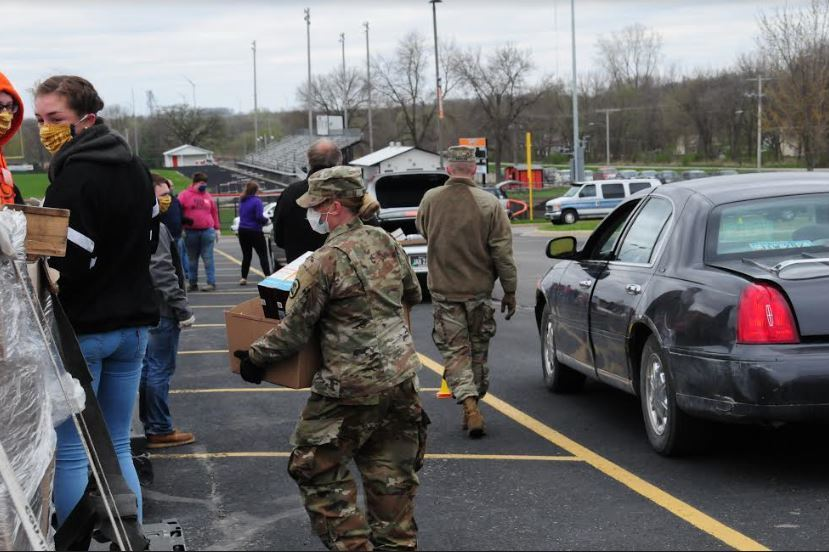
Food distribution in Charles City

On April 3, 2020, Governor Reynolds defended her government's response, arguing that the measures taken, including closing schools and some businesses, were equivalent to a mandatory shelter-in-place or stay-at-home directive.

On July 7, Governor Reynolds indicated that "local governments cannot implement mask requirements because they are not consistent with her public health disaster proclamation."

On July 8, the Mayor of Muscatine issued a mask mandate, on advice from the city attorney that "the mandate is authorized under a local emergency declaration and Iowa's home rule provisions."

On July 21, the Mayor of Iowa City issued a mask mandate, in defiance of Governor Reynolds' order.

On July 23, Johnson County issued a mask mandate that would go into effect August 10, 2020, the same day of the derecho in Iowa.

On July 29, nearly 300 Iowa doctors sent a letter to Governor Reynolds urging a statewide mask mandate.

On August 7, Governor Reynolds was photographed greeting people at the Hardin County GOP Sweet Corn Feed in Eldora without wearing a mask.

On August 9, Governor Reynolds "asserted she believes cities and counties cannot implement mask orders unless she says they can," raising the possibility of legal challenges under Iowa's 1968 home rule constitutional amendment.

On August 27, Governor Reynolds' bar closures went into effect for Black Hawk, Dallas, Johnson, Linn, Polk and Story counties, after returning college students flooded into bars without taking health precautions. Governor Reynolds said that a mask mandate was "not enforceable."

On August 28, the head of the Iowa Restaurant Association expressed "dismay at the governor's order that has closed bars in six counties after coronavirus cases spiked among young adults," and suggested raising the drinking age as an alternative.

On an August 31 visit to Waterloo, Senator Joni Ernst said she was "so skeptical" of the statistics on cases and deaths due to the virus. Her statements were similar to a Presidential tweet which was removed from Twitter as misinformation linked to QAnon.

On September 2, Senator Ernst modified her position, releasing a statement saying that "Over 180,000 Americans have died because of Covid-19," and "What matters is that we are getting the resources to Iowa that are needed to fight this virus." The Mayor of Cedar Rapids signed an emergency declaration for a mask mandate.

On September 15, Governor Reynolds lifted bar closures in four counties. Although Iowa was considered a "hotspot" on that day, the Governor said she "trusted Iowans to do the right thing" and would not issue a mask mandate.

On September 16, AP reported that Governor Reynolds rejected a statewide mask order, calling it a "feel-good" action. She also blocked local officials from enforcing local mask mandates.

On September 24, after inspections at five meatpacking plants where outbreaks sickened thousands of workers, state regulators issued a $957 fine to one plant "for a minor record-keeping violation."

On October 4, a White House task force report advised against gatherings of more than 25 people in the Des Moines area.

On October 2, with a surge of cases in the state, Governor Reynolds relaxed state guidance on quarantine, so that "workers and children in day cares and schools don't have to quarantine as long as they and the infected person with whom they were in contact were consistently and correctly wearing face coverings." This state guidance contradicted the CDC, "which recommends a 14-day quarantine for anyone who is in close contact with someone who has tested positive regardless of mask use." Bars in Johnson and Story counties were allowed to reopen.

On October 4, a White House Coronavirus Task Force report said that many virus-related deaths in Iowa were preventable, and that community transmission remained high. A mask requirement was recommended for Iowa.

On October 14, thousands of supporters, including Governor Reynolds, attended a presidential campaign rally at Des Moines International Airport, with few masks being worn.

On October 16, Governor Reynolds said that Iowans "need to monitor" what's going on in their community.

On October 18, the White House Coronavirus Task Force report for Iowa said "the state needs to strengthen mitigation efforts."

On October 19, Iowa State Auditor Rob Sand and the U.S. Treasury Department inspector general advised Governor Reynolds' that $21 million of Iowa's CARES Act COVID-19 funds had not been used properly, and would need to be reallocated or repaid. An article in The Gazette described how federal stimulus funding was supporting Iowa's rural hospitals through the pandemic, and said that major federal legislation would be needed to keep some critical access hospitals in rural areas from closing.

On October 22, many businesses remained closed, despite the fact that Iowa was one of the few states that had never imposed a full stay-at-home order.

On October 23, Representative Cindy Axne, whose district includes Des Moines and southwestern Iowa, said, "Our older Iowans — many have not been able to leave their homes because they do not feel safe ... If you go into a grocery store, the large majority of people are not wearing masks."

In mid-November during state's highest virus rate to date, Governor Reynolds required masks for indoor events with more than 25 people and outdoor events of more than 100 people.

On May 20, 2021, at the close of the 89th Iowa General Assembly, Governor Reynolds signed into law the Vaccine Passport Ban Law which prohibited organizations or local governments from requiring individuals to show proof of receiving a COVID-19 vaccination and prevents state and local governments from issuing ID cards which would indicate an individual's vaccination status. The law took effect immediately. Earlier in May 2021 and based on new guidance from the Centers for Disease Control and Prevention as well as the Iowa Department of Public Health, Governor Reynolds signed into law a ban on school districts and local and county governments from requiring masks worn on public property if the individual is fully vaccinated. This law took effect on May 20, 2021. The Iowa Immunizations Registry Information System contains a listing of vaccination records of persons fully vaccinated for COVID-19.

On September 27, 2021, Federal Judge Robert Pratt issued a temporary order, which overturned the ban on mask mandates for school districts (Iowa Code section 280.31), barring Governor Reynolds and Iowa Department of Education Director Ann Lebo from enforcing the Iowa law banning mask mandates for school districts. Judge Pratt's temporary order will remain in effect until the court issues an order for a preliminary injunction.

== Testing ==
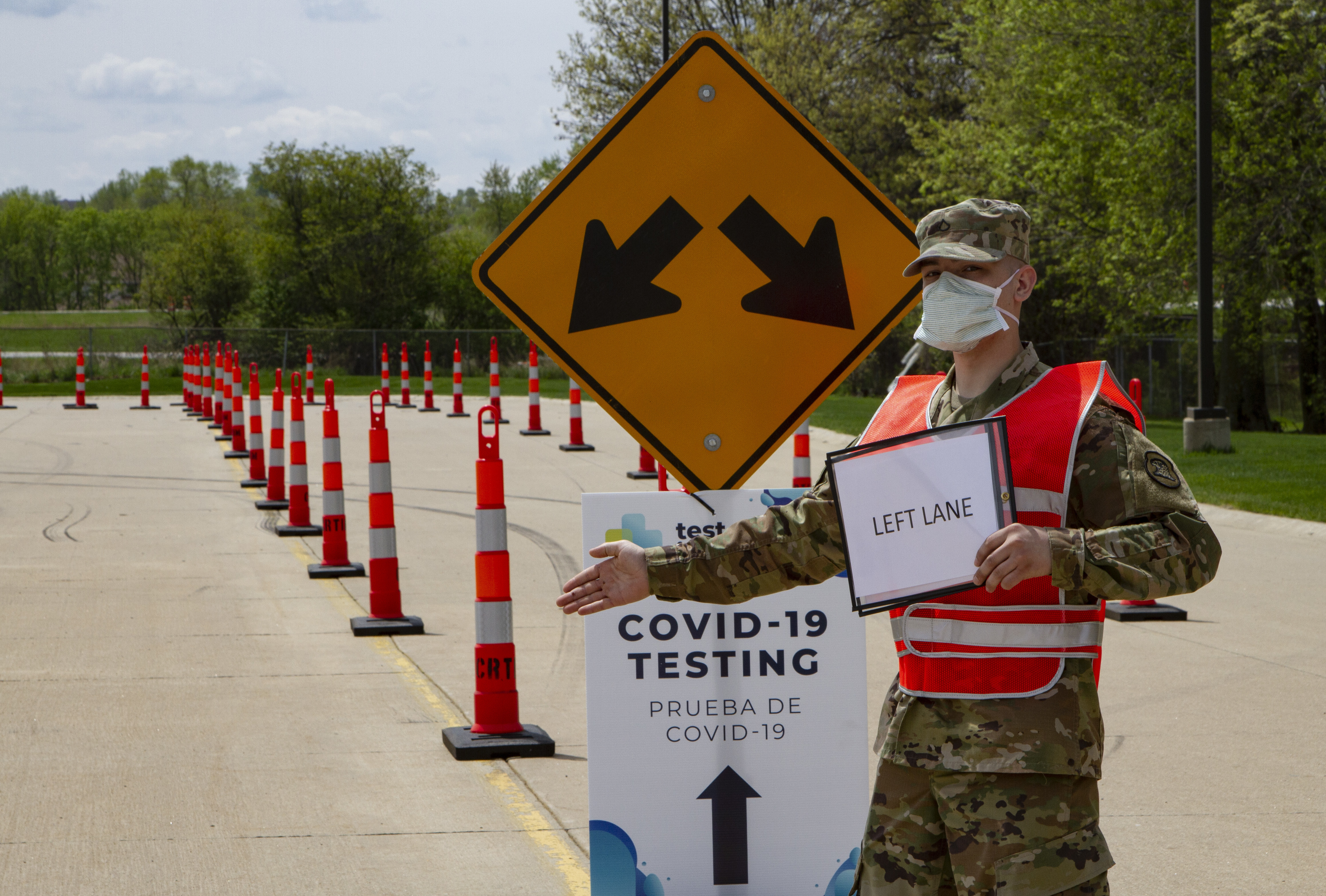
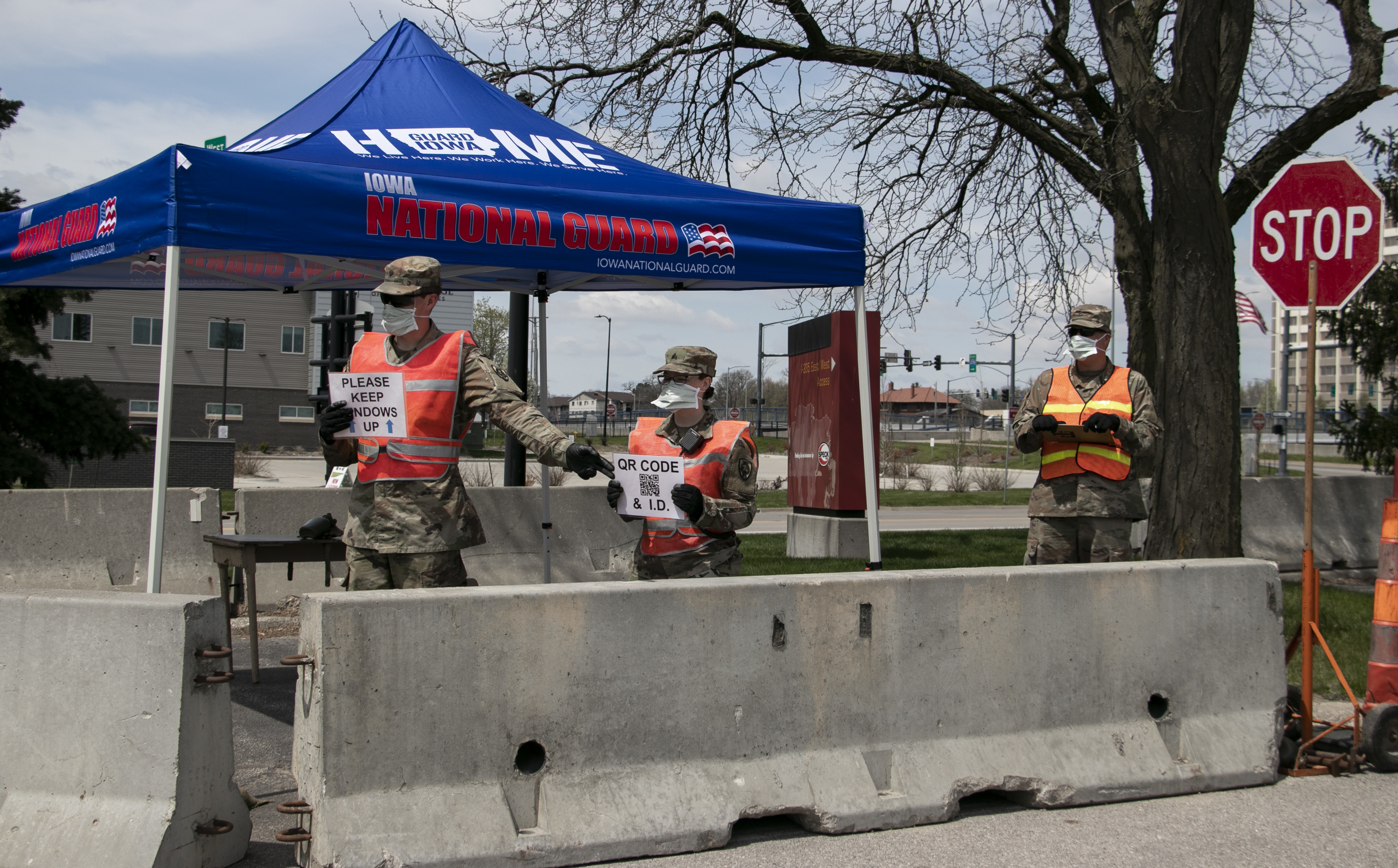
Testing site at Kirkwood Community College in Cedar Rapids

Initially, Iowa had a low rate of persons testing positive for the coronavirus. Upon a recommendation from Ashton Kutcher, a Utah-based company was hired to run Iowa's $26 million coronavirus testing program.

On April 25, 2020, the first new testing site was launched in Des Moines under the new initiative TestIowa.com.

During a May 6, 2020, White House meeting with Governor Reynolds, Trump responded to the substantially increased coronavirus testing rate that "... all this testing, we make ourselves look bad... we're going to have more cases."

On May 14, 2020, Governor Reynolds announced that the Iowa State Hygienic Laboratory had completed TestIowa's validation and could start processing these tests as well. As of May 22, 2020, the TestIowa program was operating eight test sites.

As of May 22, 2020, researchers at the University of Iowa were hoping for a newly developed at-home spit test to be approved within weeks.

In August 2020, Iowa State conducted targeted testing of students who were symptomatic or had exposures, resulting in a 13.6% positivity rate for the first week of class, and a 28.8% positivity rate for the second week of class. A total of 655 students and 10 staff tested positive during the month of August.

Between August 18 - September 1, 2020, the University of Iowa reported 922 "self-reported positive or presumed positive COVID-19 tests" among students, and 13 among employees.

== Testing reporting inaccuracy ==
Throughout the early months of the pandemic, discrepancies arose in the publicly reported data on the Iowa Department of Public Health website. For months, numerous people queried the IDPH for answers about changing historic positivity rates and growing discrepancies in the number of tests reported positive versus the positivity rates, including Sara Konrad Baranowski, editor for the Times Citizen in Iowa Falls.

On August 17, 2020, the media reported that several days earlier, Iowa Department of Public Health epidemiologist, Rob Ramaekers, admitted in an email to a nurse practitioner, Dana Jones, that positive test results were linked to the date that individual was first tested, as opposed to when the positive test actually occurred, leading to an underestimation of the current positivity rates. Furthermore, it came to light that the head of the IDPH, Caitlin Pedati had been aware of the problem since July, but did not fix it or publicly announce the erroneous data until the inaccuracies were publicized by the media after Jones' discovery.

Since school reopening decisions were to be based on these numbers, this revelation led to statements from the Iowa State Education Association (the teachers' union) and leading Infectious Disease experts that school reopening decisions should be delayed until the data were corrected. Instead, after the public revelation that the state-reported numbers were inaccurate and falsely low, IDPH announced that they changed their reporting, but positive cases continued to disappear from recent weeks and new positive tests continued to show up in remote past weeks. Furthermore, on August 21, 2020, they stopped publicly reporting positivity rates altogether. On August 28, 2020, a local news station uncovered that the state was reporting all positive antigen tests as "inconclusive" rather than positive. At the time, Iowa communities Ames and Iowa City were ranked worst metro areas for positivity rates in the country

== Impact ==
Researchers at Iowa State University created a web hub to help track the COVID-19 pandemic's impacts on the economy.

=== Meatpacking industry ===
Iowa's largest industry sector is manufacturing, with food manufacturing constituting the largest subsector.

Five meat packers dominate the United States with over 80% of the market: JBS, Smithfield, Cargill, Tyson, and Hormel.

==== Tyson Foods plants ====
On April 26, 2020, John Tyson, the billionaire heir and chairman of the board of Tyson Foods which is the second-largest meat packer in the world, stated that nationwide meat shortages were likely due to the COVID-19 pandemic. According to Liz Croston, Tyson Foods communications manager, they will not reveal the specific number of affected employees at the Perry plant until it crosses the threshold of 10% of their workforce, a company policy they've used at other locations.

- In April 2020, a Tyson Foods pork processing plant in Columbus Junction closed down after 148 workers tested positive for coronavirus, and two workers died.
- The Tyson plant in Waterloo shut down on April 22 after more than 180 tested positive for the coronavirus. The Tyson Foods plant at Waterloo re-opened on May 7, 2020. On May 8, 2020, Black Hawk County health officials revealed that 1,031 of the 2,800 workers or 38% at the Waterloo plant tested positive for the coronavirus.
- The entire workforce at the Perry Tyson Foods plant was tested on April 25, 2020. On May 6, 2020, Sarah Reisetter, deputy director for the Iowa Department of Health, stated that 730 out of a workforce of over 1,200 at the Perry Tyson Foods plant had tested positive for coronavirus and that before closing, 26% of the Columbus Junction plant and 17% of the Waterloo plant had tested positive for COVID-19.
- On May 8, 2020, at Sioux City in Woodbury County, health officials were conducting extensive testing for the Siouxland District Health Department due to its close proximity to the Tyson Foods plant at Dakota City, Nebraska, in addition to the testing at the Test Iowa site. According to Tyler Brock, deputy director for Siouxland District Health, no results of the testing will be made public until the Iowa state epidemiologist, the state director of health, approves its release to the public. On May 2, 2020, Woodbury County had the second highest coronavirus test positive rate at 35% in Iowa.
- On Saturday May 16, 2020, the state of Iowa through Test Iowa will test more than 3,000 employees at the two Tyson Foods plants at Storm Lake in Buena Vista County.

==== Iowa Premium National Beef ====
On May 6, 2020, the Iowa Premium National Beef plant in Tama was reported having a coronavirus cluster.

==== Hormel ====
On May 6, 2020, the Hormel plant in Osceola was reported having a coronavirus cluster.

==== West Liberty Foods ====
On May 8, 2020, the West Liberty Foods turkey packing plant at West Liberty announced furloughing one third of their workforce after the sharp decline in demand for turkey products which resulted in a huge oversupply of turkey products in cold storage and that 136 employees out of 994 tested positive for the coronavirus. Since farmers will reduce the size of their turkey flocks sent to the plant for 18 weeks beginning in June, the plant will not process turkeys beginning in November 2020 and continuing for four months until spring 2021.

==== Upper Iowa Beef ====
By May 13, 2020, 22 of 150 people associated with an Upper Iowa Beef plant in Lime Springs, Iowa, were tested positive for COVID-19.

=== Unemployment ===
By May 14, 2020, Iowa reported record new weekly unemployment claims for eight straight weeks, totaling at 299,098, which represents almost 20% of Iowa's eligible workforce.

=== Education ===
The University of Iowa, Iowa State University, and the University of Northern Iowa are expecting losses from the COVID-19 pandemic to exceed $76 million, $89 million, and $28 million, respectively. All three public universities are also considering freezing tuition and fees for the academic year 2020–21. Both University of Iowa and Iowa State University project decreased fall enrollment.

On September 28, the University of Iowa had received over 450 complaints regarding non-compliance with coronavirus safety measures, including seven reports of failure to isolate or quarantine. Iowa City police responded to numerous calls about loud parties, noise, and COVID-19-related matters. The University of Iowa reported over 2,000 cases since August 16. Iowa State University had 1,701 cases since August 1. The University of Northern Iowa had 163 cases since Aug. 17. University officials praised a bar closure in selected counties, set to expire on October 4, for "helping prevent spread among students."

On September 29, a group of RAs at the University of Iowa started a petition for hazard pay, due to duties that included "delivering meals to infected students living on isolation floors", cleaning up biohazardous substances like blood and vomit, and enforcing a one-guest-per-person policy which included breaking up parties of intoxicated or maskless students.

On October 6, the state teachers' union said that 39% of Iowa's 339 school districts, area education agencies and community colleges, 39% still did not require face coverings.

On October 7, "13 Iowa counties were over a 15% threshold set by Reynolds at which school districts may temporarily shift to online-only instruction." There were 927 children under age 17 and 4,171 educators who tested positive, with 568 of the educators were at risk of serious health complications.

=== Elections ===
In Iowa's primary elections, polling locations were greatly reduced: for example there were 28 locations instead of the usual 135 in Polk County. 55,000 absentee votes were cast in the county.

=== Prisons ===
Through a statewide prison labor program, prisoners across Iowa helped make 98,000 masks, 40,000 gowns, 17,000 face shields, and 24,000 gallons of hand sanitizer within a few weeks.

=== Sports ===
Due to Minor League Baseball being shut down and cancelled for 2020, the Iowa Cubs, a Triple-A baseball team in Des Moines, are exploring making Principal Park available for concerts and amateur baseball games.

Softball and baseball games were supposed to begin being carried out again in Iowa starting on June 15.

NASCAR cancelled the Xfinity Series and Gander RV & Outdoor Series 2020 events at Iowa Speedway in Newton, The track opted to replace one of the event's with a Second INDYCAR Race in which happened to be a doubleheader Iowa INDYCAR 250s on July 17–18, and the ARCA Menards Series date remains on the calendar

The MLB's Field Of Dreams Game in Dyersville, originally scheduled for August 13, has been rescheduled for 2021 which is to feature the White Sox and New York Yankees.

On August 31, The University of Iowa announced pausing its athletics training programs until after Labor Day on September 7.

On August 31, Jamie Pollard, athletic director at Iowa State University, announced that 25,000 fans would be allowed to attend Iowa State's opening home football game against Louisiana on September 12 and its Big 12 Conference home opener against Oklahoma on October 3, 2020, at Jack Trice Stadium in Ames if fans can follow mitigation efforts during the Louisiana game. On September 2, Pollard stated that no fans will be allowed in Jack Trice Stadium for the September 12, 2020, home opener Iowa State vs. Louisiana football game. On September 4, Pollard estimated an athletics department budget deficit will increase from over $17 million to $30 million because of coronavirus impacts which will result in cutting sports programs in accordance with the Patsy T. Mink Equal Opportunity in Education Act (Title IX laws); closing C.Y. Stephens Auditorium, which also requires up to $50 million in renovations; more payroll cuts and layoffs in addition to the department wide actions which have already been implemented saving almost $4 million: suspension of incentives and bonuses along with most coaches and staff receiving a 10% reduction in pay.

On September 19, the Big Ten announced its 2020 season football schedule and that on October 24 the Iowa Hawkeyes will play their first game at Purdue.

== Statistics ==
COVID-19 pandemic medical cases in Iowa by county
County (Note: County where individuals with a positive case reside. Location of diagnosis and treatment may vary.)	Cases (Note: Reported confirmed and probable cases. Actual case numbers are probably higher.) (Note: Includes 1 case from an unknown county.)	Deaths	Population (Note: July 2019 population estimate from "U.S. Census Bureau Quick Facts: Iowa". United States Census Bureau.)	Cases / 100k
99 / 99	908,936	10,797	3,155,070	28,808.7
Adair	1,809	52	7,152	25,293.6
Adams	944	16	3,602	26,207.7
Allamakee	3,271	69	13,687	23,898.6
Appanoose	3,446	80	12,426	27,732.2
Audubon	1,316	25	5,496	23,944.7
Benton	7,278	82	25,645	28,379.8
Black Hawk	39,227	532	131,228	29,892.2
Boone	6,573	71	26,234	25,055.3
Bremer	6,418	89	25,062	25,608.5
Buchanan	5,594	67	21,175	26,417.9
Buena Vista	7,005	66	19,620	35,703.4
Butler	3,849	62	14,439	26,657.0
Calhoun	3,087	26	9,668	31,930.1
Carroll	5,704	85	20,165	28,286.6
Cass	3,345	89	12,836	26,059.5
Cedar	5,050	49	18,627	27,111.2
Cerro Gordo	12,819	183	42,450	30,197.9
Cherokee	3,600	75	11,235	32,042.7
Chickasaw	3,171	37	11,933	26,573.4
Clarke	2,710	44	9,395	28,845.1
Clay	4,876	55	16,016	30,444.6
Clayton	4,062	81	17,549	23,146.6
Clinton	13,940	174	46,429	30,024.3
Crawford	5,181	59	16,820	30,802.6
Dallas	27,009	160	93,453	28,901.2
Davis	1,832	35	9,000	20,355.6
Decatur	1,854	29	7,870	23,557.8
Delaware	4,809	71	17,011	28,269.9
Des Moines	11,360	166	38,967	29,152.9
Dickinson	4,754	78	17,258	27,546.6
Dubuque	31,168	332	97,311	32,029.3
Emmet	2,716	57	9,208	29,496.1
Fayette	4,989	89	19,650	25,389.3
Floyd	4,200	70	15,642	26,850.8
Franklin	2,975	51	10,070	29,543.2
Fremont	1,649	29	6,960	23,692.5
Greene	2,057	28	8,888	23,143.6
Grundy	3,067	50	12,232	25,073.6
Guthrie	2,783	48	10,689	26,036.1
Hamilton	4,011	92	14,773	27,150.9
Hancock	3,298	52	10,630	31,025.4
Hardin	5,091	71	16,846	30,220.8
Harrison	3,856	102	14,049	27,446.8
Henry	6,536	84	19,954	32,755.3
Howard	2,337	37	9,158	25,518.7
Humboldt	3,101	44	9,558	32,444.0
Ida	2,176	51	6,860	31,720.1
Iowa	4,356	54	16,184	26,915.5
Jackson	5,594	75	19,439	28,777.2
Jasper	10,503	125	37,185	28,245.3
Jefferson	4,451	63	18,295	24,329.1
Johnson	45,242	183	151,140	29,933.8
Jones	6,493	84	20,681	31,396.0
Keokuk	2,489	55	10,246	24,292.4
Kossuth	4,388	102	14,813	29,622.6
Lee	9,247	151	33,657	27,474.2
Linn	65,239	670	226,706	28,776.9
Louisa	2,954	68	11,035	26,769.4
Lucas	2,198	35	8,600	25,558.1
Lyon	3,175	56	11,755	27,009.8
Madison	3,727	48	16,338	22,811.8
Mahaska	5,828	95	22,095	26,377.0
Marion	8,949	137	33,253	26,911.9
Marshall	11,534	138	39,369	29,297.2
Mills	4,019	47	15,109	26,600.0
Mitchell	2,851	51	10,586	26,931.8
Monona	2,110	56	8,615	24,492.2
Monroe	2,204	52	7,707	28,597.4
Montgomery	2,618	60	9,917	26,399.1
Muscatine	11,299	140	42,664	26,483.7
O'Brien	3,902	73	13,753	28,372.0
Osceola	1,579	23	5,958	26,502.2
Page	3,866	56	15,107	25,590.8
Palo Alto	2,428	42	8,886	27,323.9
Plymouth	7,228	116	25,177	28,708.7
Pocahontas	1,953	31	6,619	29,506.0
Polk	148,258	1,235	490,161	30,246.8
Pottawattamie	28,084	354	93,206	30,131.1
Poweshiek	4,698	66	18,504	25,389.1
Ringgold	1,324	43	4,894	27,053.5
Sac	2,906	43	9,721	29,894.0
Scott	49,293	452	172,943	28,502.5
Shelby	3,191	59	11,454	27,859.3
Sioux	9,042	100	34,855	25,941.8
Story	23,443	105	97,117	24,138.9
Tama	4,711	102	16,854	27,951.8
Taylor	1,543	25	6,121	25,208.3
Union	3,198	56	12,241	26,125.3
Van Buren	1,704	28	7,044	24,190.8
Wapello	10,491	224	34,969	30,000.9
Warren	14,575	157	51,466	28,319.7
Washington	6,854	90	21,965	31,204.2
Wayne	1,523	35	6,441	23,645.4
Webster	12,154	187	35,904	33,851.4
Winnebago	3,473	48	10,354	33,542.6
Winneshiek	4,529	59	19,991	22,655.2
Woodbury	33,488	358	103,107	32,478.9
Worth	2,052	17	7,381	27,801.1
Wright	4,074	74	12,562	32,431.1
Final update March 29, 2023, with data through the previous day Data is publicly reported by Iowa Department of Public Health

== See also ==
- Timeline of the COVID-19 pandemic in the United States
- COVID-19 pandemic in the United States – for impact on the country
- COVID-19 pandemic – for impact on other countries
