= The Family Leader =

American socially conservative umbrella group

- Purpose: Social conservatism
- Location: Pleasant Hill, Iowa
- Region served: Iowa
- Key people: Bob Vander Plaats (President and CEO); Chuck Hurley (President, Iowa Family Policy Center)

The Family Leader (stylized The FAMiLY LEADER) is an American socially conservative umbrella group comprising The Family Leader Foundation, Marriage Matters, Iowa Family PAC, and Iowans for Freedom. The Family Leader is loosely affiliated with the national social conservative organization Focus on the Family. According to its website, The Family Leader "provides a consistent, courageous voice in the churches, in the legislature, in the media, in the courtroom, in the public square...always standing for God’s truth."

== Arms of the organization ==
- The Iowa Family Policy Center is the educational arm and works through the media and also operates the Iowa Liberty Justice Center, a public interest law firm handling cases "in the areas of religious liberty, family values, or sanctity of life."
- Marriage Matters seeks to strengthen marriage through individual mentoring and seminars.
- The Iowa Family PAC is a political action committee which supports social conservative candidates. It was formed in 2004
- Iowa for Freedom "stands up against judicial activism" and was heavily involved in the campaign to remove three Iowa Supreme Court justices who legalized same-sex marriage in Iowa in the Varnum v. Brien case.

== 2012 presidential election ==
Through the new group, the organization planned to play a more influential role in the 2012 Iowa caucus campaigns than in 2008, including offering an endorsement for the first time.

In mid-2011, The Family Leader gained national recognition for its pledge, "The Marriage Vow: A Declaration of Dependence upon MARRIAGE and FAMILY", which it asked 2012 presidential hopefuls to sign. Vander Plaats himself also gained recognition, being referred to in one news post as a "kingmaker". The Hill claimed Vander Plaats' endorsement as one of the top 10 coveted endorsements for Republicans running for president.

Though the pledge was signed very quickly by candidate Michele Bachmann, others were not so quick to sign or support it. Former Iowa State Senator Jeff Angelo, a Republican, said: "This pledge is an attempt to shut down dialogue between voters and the people vying to represent them." Presidential hopeful Mitt Romney called the pledge "undignified and inappropriate". Romney's campaign later clarified that he would not sign because language in the pledge made the assertion that African American children born into slavery in 1860 were better off than children raised today. He was not the only one to take issue with this language. The "slavery portion" of the pledge was soon removed.

After the controversies with the pledge, House Speaker Pro-Tem Jeff Kaufmann, said the pledge has "ridiculous implications", questioned Vander Plaats' integrity, and said that his "political credibility is waning to the point of no impact."

In November and December 2011, the organization "agonized" over whether to make an endorsement and whom to endorse. After removing Herman Cain, Jon Huntsman, Ron Paul, and Mitt Romney from consideration, the seven-member board of directors of the organization could not decide on one candidate among Newt Gingrich, Michele Bachmann, Rick Santorum, and Rick Perry. The organization announced on December 20, 2011, that it would officially stay neutral and instead allow board members to make their own endorsements; Vander Plaats and Hurley endorsed Santorum.
