= 1846 in Iowa =

- Decades: 1840s; 1850s; 1860s
- See also: History of Iowa; Historical outline of Iowa; List of years in Iowa; 1846 in the United States

The following is a list of events of the year 1846 in Iowa.

== Incumbents ==
=== State government ===
- Governor: Ansel Briggs (R)

== Events ==
- 1846 Iowa Senate election
- December 3 – Ansel Briggs is elected as the first governor of Iowa during the 1846 Iowa gubernatorial election.
- December 28 – The Iowa Territory is admitted to the union of the United States as the 29th U.S state.

== See also ==
- 1846 in the United States
