= 1854 in Iowa =

- Decades: 1840s; 1850s; 1860s; 1870s
- See also: History of Iowa; Historical outline of Iowa; List of years in Iowa; 1854 in the United States

The following is a list of events of the year 1854 in Iowa.

== Incumbents ==
=== State government ===
- Governor: Stephen P. Hempstead (D) (January 1 - December 9) James W. Grimes (W) (December 9–31)

== Events ==
- August 7 - James W. Grimes wins the gubernatorial election, beating Curtis Bates.
- October 25–27 - The first Iowa State Fair was held in Fairfield.

== See also ==
- 1854 in the United States
