= 1850 in Iowa =

- Decades: 1840s; 1850s; 1860s; 1870s
- See also: History of Iowa; Historical outline of Iowa; List of years in Iowa; 1850 in the United States

The following is a list of events of the year 1850 in Iowa.

== Incumbents ==
=== State government ===
- Governor: Ansel Briggs (D) (January 1 - December 4) Stephen P. Hempstead (D) (December 4–31)

== Events ==
- The first census after becoming a state shows the population of Iowa at 192,214 people.

== See also ==
- 1850 in the United States
