= 1849 in Iowa =

- Decades: 1840s; 1850s; 1860s
- See also: History of Iowa; Historical outline of Iowa; List of years in Iowa; 1849 in the United States

The following events occurred in Iowa in the year 1849.

== Incumbents ==
=== State government ===
- Governor: Ansel Briggs (D)

== Events ==
- Sac and Fox Native Americans were forced to leave their lands in Tama and Benton counties.
- July - Des Moines First Newspaper, The Iowa Star, now known as the Des Moines Register, becomes Des Moines first newspaper.

== See also ==
- 1849 in the United States
