= 1852 in Iowa =

- Decades: 1840s; 1850s; 1860s; 1870s
- See also: History of Iowa; Historical outline of Iowa; List of years in Iowa; 1852 in the United States

The following is a list of events of the year 1852 in Iowa.

== Incumbents ==
=== State government ===
- Governor: Stephen P. Hempstead (D)

== Events ==
- November 2 - Franklin Pierce wins the presidential election in Iowa, beating Winfield Scott by a margin of 5.39%.
- November 27 - Thomas J. Loyd was killed by Joel Wines in Red Rock, Marion County.
- The Sioux Indians ceded their last remaining land to Iowa.

== See also ==
- 1852 in the United States
