= 1851 in Iowa =

- Decades: 1840s; 1850s; 1860s; 1870s
- See also: History of Iowa; Historical outline of Iowa; List of years in Iowa; 1851 in the United States

The following is a list of events of the year 1851 in Iowa.

== Incumbents ==
=== State government ===
- Governor: Stephen P. Hempstead (D)

== Events ==
- January 15 - 43 counties are established.
- February 5 - The first code of the state, known as the Code of 1851, was enacted by the legislature and approved by the governor.
- May - July - The “Great Flood of 1851” - As much as 74.5 inches of rain fell in Iowa, causing major damage to cities in the area like Des Moines.
- July 8 - Guthrie County established.

== See also ==
- 1851 in the United States
- List of counties in Iowa
