= 1847 in Iowa =

- Decades: 1840s; 1850s; 1860s
- See also: History of Iowa; Historical outline of Iowa; List of years in Iowa; 1847 in the United States

The following is a list of events of the year 1847 in Iowa.

== Incumbents ==
=== State government ===
- Governor: Ansel Briggs (D)

== Events ==
- February - Great Seal of the State of Iowa Adopted
- February 25 - The University of Iowa is established.
- August - About 1,000 Hollanders under the direction from Henry Peter Scholte settled northeast part of Marion County, now town of Pella.

== See also ==
1847 in the United States
