= 1848 in Iowa =

- Decades: 1840s; 1850s; 1860s
- See also: History of Iowa; Historical outline of Iowa; List of years in Iowa; 1848 in the United States

The following is a list of events of the year 1848 in Iowa.

== Incumbents ==
=== State government ===
- Governor: Ansel Briggs (D)

== Events ==
- Summer - Rev. Michael Hummer climbed into the belfry of the Presbyterian Church in Iowa City, trying to “recover” the bell he believed to be his.
- November 7 - Lewis Cass wins the United States presidential election in Iowa.

== See also ==
1848 in the United States
