= 1853 in Iowa =

- Decades: 1840s; 1850s; 1860s; 1870s
- See also: History of Iowa; Historical outline of Iowa; List of years in Iowa; 1853 in the United States

The following is a list of events of the year 1853 in Iowa.

== Incumbents ==
=== State government ===
- Governor: Stephen P. Hempstead (D)

== Events ==
- January 12 - Webster and Woodbury counties are established.
- January 17 - The first bridge on the Mississippi River is built, connecting Rock Island with Davenport.

== See also ==
- 1853 in the United States
- List of counties in Iowa
