= 1850 Iowa gubernatorial election =

- August 5, 1850

Nominee	Stephen P. Hempstead	James L. Thompson
Party	Democratic	Whig
Popular vote	13,486	11,403
Percentage	52.94%	44.76%
- County results Hempstead: 50–60% 60–70% 80–90% Thompson: 40–50% 50–60% 80–90% No Data/Votes
Governor before election
Ansel Briggs
Democratic
Elected Governor
Stephen P. Hempstead
Democratic

The 1850 Iowa gubernatorial election was held on August 5, 1850.

Incumbent Democratic governor Ansel Briggs declined to stand for re-election.

Democratic nominee Stephen P. Hempstead defeated Whig nominee James L. Thompson and Free Soil nominee William Penn Clark with 52.94% of the vote.

== General election ==
=== Candidates ===
- William Penn Clark, Free Soil, lawyer, former newspaper editor
- Stephen P. Hempstead, Democratic, former president of the Iowa Territory Legislative Council
- James L. Thompson, Whig, Methodist preacher

=== Results ===
1850 Iowa gubernatorial election (Note: Some sources give the result as Thompson's vote as 11,452. The result given is taken from the Iowa Senate Journal.)
Party	Candidate	Votes	%	±%
Democratic	Stephen P. Hempstead	13,486	52.94%	
Whig	James L. Thompson	11,403	44.76%	
Free Soil	William Penn Clark	575	2.26%	
Scattering		11	0.04%	
Majority		2,083	8.18%	
Turnout		25,475		
Democratic hold		Swing		
