= Thomas McKnight (Iowa pioneer) =

American politician

Thomas McKnight (March 10, 1787 – December 1, 1865) was an American pioneer, businessman, and politician who settled in Dubuque, Iowa.

Born in Augusta County, Virginia, McKnight was a merchant in Nashville, Tennessee, and then in St. Louis, Missouri. While in St. Louis, McKnight was president of a bank and served on the St. Louis City Council in 1822. He then moved to Galena, Illinois, where he was involved in the lead mining industry. In 1838, McKnight was appointed land receiver for the United States Land Office for the Galena mining district. Eventually, he moved to Dubuque County, in the Iowa District of Wisconsin Territory. McKnight served in the first Wisconsin Territorial Council (upper house) of the Wisconsin Territorial Legislature [at the same time as the Thomas McKnight from Mineral Point served in the House of Representatives (the lower house)], which would hold three sessions between October 25, 1836 and June 25, 1838.

He opened the first smelting furnace business in Dubuque. In the 1840 Federal census, he stated that he held two slaves in Dubuque County, in spite of the fact that slavery was not legal under the Northwest Ordinance. In 1846, he was the Whig candidate for Governor of Iowa against Democrat Ansel Briggs, but lost with 7,379 votes to Briggs' 7,626. In 1847, he was the Whig candidate for Iowa's 2nd congressional district, but lost to Democrat Shepherd Leffler with 48.58% of the vote to Leffler's 51.43%.

McKnight died in Dubuque.

== Notes ==
Party political offices
First	Whig nominee Governor of Iowa; 1846	Succeeded by James L. Thompson
