= Nelson G. Williams =

Union Army general

Nelson Grosvenor Williams
- Born: May 4, 1823; Bainbridge, New York
- Died: November 30, 1897 (aged 74); Brooklyn, New York
- Burial place: Green-Wood Cemetery, Brooklyn, New York
- Military career
- Allegiance: United States of America; Union
- Branch: United States Army; Union Army
- Service years: 1861-1862
- Rank: Colonel; Brigadier General
- Commands: 3rd Iowa Volunteer Infantry
- Conflicts: American Civil War: Battle of Shiloh

Nelson Grosvenor Williams (May 4, 1823 – November 30, 1897) was a New York City customs agent and Union Army officer during the American Civil War.

== Early life ==
Williams was born in New York and was appointed to West Point in 1839. He resigned a year later due to poor math grades. He worked as an importer in New York City before moving to Iowa in 1855. Finding work as a storekeeper in Dubuque, Williams finally settled on a farm in Dyersville.

== Civil War ==
Williams was commissioned colonel of the 3rd Iowa Volunteer Infantry Regiment on June 26, 1861. He served under Stephen A. Hurlbut in Missouri, becoming engaged in minor skirmishes there. In December 1861 Colonel Williams received a court-martial for cowardice but was acquitted.

In February 1862, Hurlbut's command was added to Ulysses S. Grant's Army of West Tennessee, becoming the 4th Division. Williams assumed command of the 1st Brigade and led it into action at the Battle of Shiloh. Early in the fighting, Williams' horse was shot and fell on him, forcing the colonel to relinquish command. Command of the brigade passed to Colonel Isaac C. Pugh for the remainder of the battle. Williams spent several weeks recovering and resigned his commission on November 27, 1862. On November 29, 1862, he was appointed brigadier general; however, the U.S. Senate negated the appointment because he was no longer on active duty, and Williams returned to civilian life.

== Later life ==
Williams returned to his farm in Iowa and remained there until 1869 when Ulysses S. Grant appointed him deputy collector of customs in New York City. Williams held this position for 25 years. He died at his home in Brooklyn in 1897.

== Sources ==
- Eicher, John H., and David J. Eicher. Civil War High Commands. Stanford, CA: Stanford University Press, 2001. ISBN 0-8047-3641-3.
- Warner, Ezra J. Generals in Blue: Lives of the Union Commanders. Baton Rouge: Louisiana State University Press, 1964. ISBN 0-8071-0822-7.
