= Modena Weston =

Civil War Union nurse, (1816 – 1898)

Nurse Modena McColl Weston
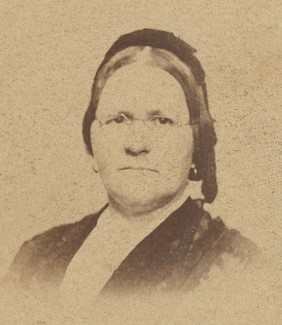
- Pictured in Memphis, TN during the time of her Civil War service
- Born: Modena McColl; August 3, 1816; Albany, New York, US
- Died: November 25, 1898 (aged 82); Bay St. Louis, Mississippi, US
- Military career
- Allegiance: United States (Union)
- Branch: Army
- Service years: 1861–1866
- Rank: Matron
- Nickname: "Mother of the Regiment"
- Unit: 3rd Iowa Infantry Regiment
- Known for: Civil war nurse
- Conflicts: Battle of Shiloh

Modena Weston (née McColl; August 3, 1816 in Albany, New York – November 25, 1898 in Bay St. Louis, Mississippi) was a nurse for the Union during the American Civil War.

== Nursing career ==
She enlisted in military service as a nurse in Iowa on September 1, 1861. Her service began with the 3rd Iowa Infantry Hospital. She quickly became a mother to the regiment, working to quell the numerous outbreaks of measles and smallpox. Weston moved to the Benton Barracks, where she was the only woman serving but the station had an adequate supply of sanitary goods. Conditions would not be as good as she moved with the regiment to Mexico, Missouri. Here she established a field hospital where the staff would remain as the regiment moved about. At this location, the water supply was poor and often contributed to further illness. In March 1862, her regiment was deployed to Pittsburg Landing, in anticipation of the conflict that would come to be known as the Battle of Shiloh.

=== Battle of Shiloh ===
In a letter to Mary Holland, the most noteworthy moment of Weston's service was during the Battle of Shiloh. Here, in addition to the regiment, Weston cared for the wounded crew of a steamship after the battle. From this location, Weston once again moved to River Landing. Here she cared for hundreds of wounded individuals. Once again, at this location, Weston was the only woman serving. Much like her prior experience, supplies were short and Weston had to request food, and only received supplies after a few days of duty. She recounts then travelling to Savannah, caring for the sick there and then to Farrington.

Weston describes in her letter four women joining her in service, but she was soon once again the only woman as the others were wounded and left. Weston remained at this location until September when the hospital was broken up; after, she served at Jackson until March 1863 only to travel again to Memphis then to Washington, D.C.

=== Later service ===
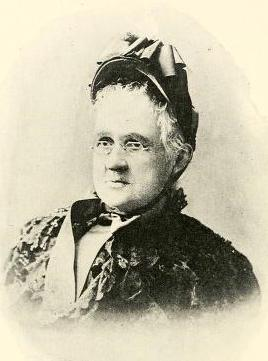
Modena Weston from an 1897 publication.

On April 20, 1863, Weston received a commission from Dorothea Dix. and in January 1864 reported to J.D. Erwin, Superintendent of the U. S. General Hospital of Memphis, Tennessee and was sent to Washington, DC to serve as a matron at a smallpox hospital. Weston finished her military service there in October 1866. She was never paid for her service.
