= 1854 Iowa gubernatorial election =

- August 7, 1854
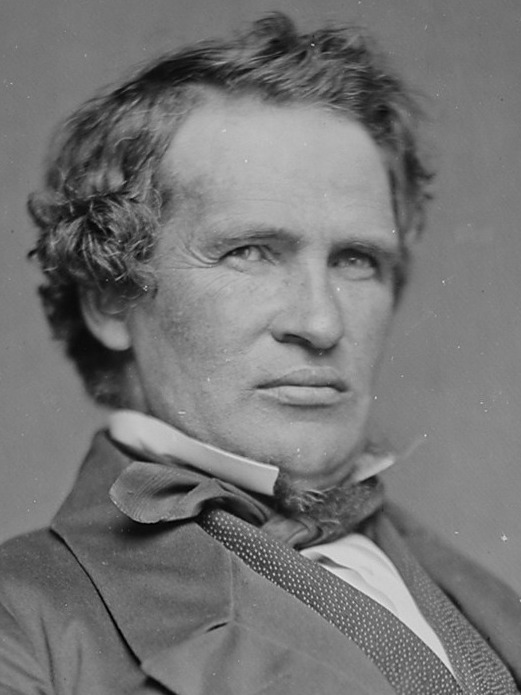

Nominee	James W. Grimes	Curtis Bates
Party	Whig	Democratic
Popular vote	23,312	21,192
Percentage	52.38%	47.62%
- County results Grimes: 50–60% 60–70% 70–80% >90% Bates: 50–60% 60–70% 70–80% 80–90% >90% No Data/Votes
Governor before election
Stephen P. Hempstead
Democratic
Elected Governor
James W. Grimes
Whig

The 1854 Iowa gubernatorial election was held on August 7, 1854, in order to elect the Governor of Iowa. Whig nominee James W. Grimes defeated Democratic nominee Curtis Bates.

== General election ==
On election day, August 7, 1854, Whig nominee James W. Grimes won the election by a margin of 2,120 votes against his opponent Democratic nominee Curtis Bates, thereby gaining Whig control over the office of Governor. Grimes was sworn in as the 3rd Governor of Iowa on December 9, 1854.

=== Results ===
Iowa gubernatorial election, 1854
Party	Candidate	Votes	%
Whig	James W. Grimes	23,312	52.38
Democratic	Curtis Bates	21,192	47.62
Total votes		44,504	100.00
Whig gain from Democratic			
