= 3rd Iowa Infantry Regiment =

- Reconstruction of the National flag carried by regiment from 1861-1862
- Active: June 8, 1861, to November 4, 1864
- Country: United States
- Allegiance: Union
- Branch: Infantry
- Size: 1,099
- Engagements: Battle of Shiloh; Action at Blue Mills Landing; Siege of Corinth; Battle of Hatchie's Bridge; Siege of Vicksburg; Siege of Jackson; Red River Campaign; Battle of Kennesaw Mountain; Battle of Atlanta

The 3rd Iowa Infantry Regiment was an infantry regiment that served in the Union Army during the American Civil War.

== Service ==
The 3rd Iowa Infantry was organized at Keokuk, Iowa and mustered into Federal forces on June 8, 1861. After moving to Hannibal, Missouri, the regiment spent its first year guarding the Hannibal & St. Joseph Railroad and engaging counter-guerilla operations.

During this period, the regiment fought its first engagement at Blue Mills Landing on September 17, 1861. Despite being heavily outnumbered, the 3rd Iowa conducted a fighting retreat that inflicted heavy casualties on the Confederates, though at the cost of 86 killed or wounded.

In March 1862, the regiment joined Ulysses S. Grant's army at Pittsburg Landing, assigned to the 1st Brigade, 4th Division, Army of the Tennessee. at the Battle of Shiloh, the regiment held a key position on the Union left for five hours under intense fire. The regiment lost 187 men out of their 560 engaged, including its commander, Major William M. Stone, who was captured.

Following Shiloh, the regiment participated in the Siege of Corinth and the Battle of Hatchie's Bridge, where they famously charged across a bridge under heavy fire to dislodge Confederate forces from the heights beyond.

The regiment took part in the Siege of Vicksburg, playing a vital role there, they served on the left of the Union line until the city's surrender on July 4, 1864.

Immediately following the city's fall, the regiment moved to Jackson, Mississippi to take part in the Siege of Jackson. On July 12, 1863, the 3rd Iowa was ordered into a disastrous frontal assault against Confederate works, where they took heavy losses, losing 114 out of their 241 engaged in just a few minutes.

In 1864, for those who didn't re-enlist as veterans took part in the Red River Campaign before being discharged, for those who re-enlisted as veterans however, joined Sherman's Atlanta Campaign.

By this time, the regiment was so depleted it was organized into a three-company battalion. During the Battle of Atlanta, their commander, Lieutenant Colonel Jacob Abernethy, was killed. On November 4, 1864, the remaining survivors were consolidated into the 2nd Iowa Infantry. this unit would later serve in Sherman's March to the Sea and the Grand Review of the Armies in Washington, D.C. Before finally being mustered out on July 12, 1865.

== Total strength and casualties ==
Unit strength was 1099. The regiment suffered 8 officers and 119 enlisted men who were killed in action or who died of their wounds and 122 enlisted men who died of disease, for a total of 249 fatalities. 207 were wounded.

== Commanders ==
- Colonel Nelson G. Williams
- Lieutenant Colonel John Scott

== See also ==
- List of Iowa Civil War Units
- Iowa in the American Civil War
- Modena Weston, "Mother" of the Regiment
