= 1846 Iowa gubernatorial election =

- October 26, 1846
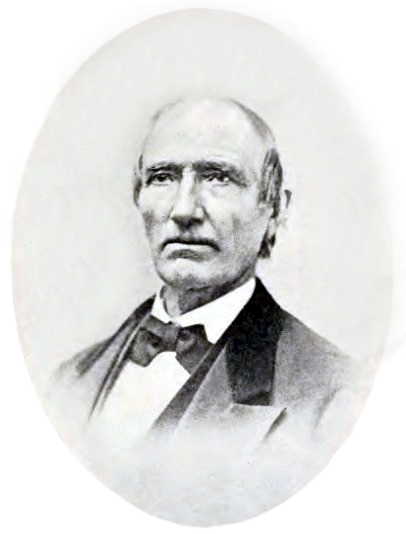

Nominee	Ansel Briggs	Thomas McKnight
Party	Democratic	Whig
Popular vote	7,626	7,379
Percentage	50.82%	49.18%
- County results Briggs: 50–60% 60–70% 70–80% 80–90% McKnight: 50–60% 60–70% No Data/Votes
Governor before election
James Clarke (Territorial)
Whig
Elected Governor
Ansel Briggs
Democratic

The 1846 Iowa gubernatorial election was held on October 26, 1846, in order to elect the first Governor of Iowa upon Iowa acquiring statehood on December 28, 1846. Democratic nominee Ansel Briggs defeated Whig nominee Thomas McKnight.

== General election ==
On election day, October 26, 1846, Democratic nominee Ansel Briggs won the election by a margin of 247 votes against his opponent Whig nominee Thomas McKnight, thereby gaining Democratic control over the new office of Governor. Briggs was sworn in as the 1st Governor of the new state of Iowa on December 28, 1846.

=== Results ===
Iowa gubernatorial election, 1846
Party	Candidate	Votes	%
Democratic	Ansel Briggs	7,626	50.82
Whig	Thomas McKnight	7,379	49.18
Total votes		15,005	100.00
Democratic gain from Whig			
