= Ansel Briggs =

American politician

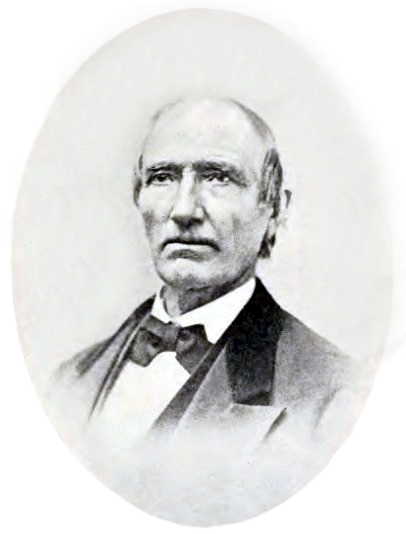

1st Governor of Iowa
- In office December 28, 1846 – December 4, 1850
- Preceded by: James Clarke as Territorial Governor of Iowa
- Succeeded by: Stephen P. Hempstead

Sheriff of Jackson County
- In office 1844–1846

Deputy Treasurer of Jackson County
- In office 1843–1844

Member of the Iowa Legislative Assembly from Jackson County
- In office 1842–1846

Personal details
- Born: February 3, 1806 Shoreham, Vermont, US
- Died: May 5, 1881 (age 75) Omaha, Nebraska, US
- Party: Democratic
- Spouse(s): Nancy M. Dunlap (died 1847); Frances Carpenter
- Children: 8
- Education: Norwich Academy
- Profession: Entrepreneur

Ansel Briggs (February 3, 1806 – May 5, 1881) was an American politician and businessman who served as the first governor of Iowa from 1846 to 1850, a member of the Democratic Party, he also was a member of the fifth territorial assembly representing Jackson County.

== Early life ==
Ansel Briggs was born in Shoreham, Vermont, to farmer Benjamin Ingley Briggs and Electa Trippman Briggs. Briggs's education started in the common schools of Vermont and continued at the Norwich Academy in Connecticut.

While still a young man, Briggs moved with his parents to Guernsey County, Ohio, where his father farmed in 1821–1825. After Benjamin Briggs died in an accident, his widow relocated to Cambridge, Ohio, and Ansel lived there for the next six years, entering a stagecoach business. He married Nancy M. Dunlap on November 11, 1830. Ansel served as Township Constable, Deputy Sheriff, and Jailor of Guernsey County; he ran, as a Whig Party candidate, unsuccessfully for the office of County Auditor for the Guernsey County, Ohio.

== Moving to Iowa ==
After hearing of all the opportunities, Briggs traveled in 1839 to what was called Andrew Jackson County in the Territory of Iowa which was shortened to Jackson County soon after. Once settled he resumed his stagecoach business, starting by driving the coaches himself much of the time. The opportunities to expand in the new territory were immense. He soon secured contracts with the Post Office Department transporting mail between Dubuque and the cities of Davenport and Iowa City, this led to more routes, expanding his business. In 1839, Briggs moved to Andrew, Iowa, a recently mapped-out town, purchasing many of the empty lots and then reselling them. He was considered a good citizen making many town improvements, building roads and commercial buildings. His stone house, on N Johnson St. in Andrew, is still inhabited to this day. His family used to have a home and mill near Brush Creek north of Andrew at a place known as Bluff Mills, which is a popular public fishing area now, even though the house and mill are now gone.

== Political life ==
When Briggs came to Iowa, he had decided to be recognized as a Democrat politically. Because his business caused him to travel to many parts of the Iowa Territory, Briggs became well known. This plus his readiness to be involved in public affairs made it easy for him to be chosen as a member of the Fifth Territorial Assembly from Jackson County in 1842. He served on the Committee on Enrolled Bills and chaired the Committee on Territorial Affairs. Briggs continued to be a representative until 1846. Briggs also served as Jackson County deputy treasurer (1843–1844) and was elected a Sheriff of Jackson County in 1844 for a two-year term.

=== Governorship ===
During the formation of a state government for Iowa, Briggs was nominated to run on the Democratic ticket. He faced two well known Democratic opponents during the primary vote—Judge Jesse Williams of Jefferson County, Iowa, who was a Secretary of Iowa Territory, and William Thompson of Henry County, Iowa, secretary of the 1846 Iowa state constitutional convention. Briggs's campaign was centered on the promise of no outside businesses, including banks, having influence in his administration. He had once made a toast at a political banquet, "No banks but earth, and they well tilled". This became his gubernatorial campaign slogan. The Democratic convention was held in Iowa City on September 24, 1846. The vote for Democratic candidacy for governor resulted in Briggs getting sixty-two votes, Jesse Williams receiving thirty-two, and William Thompson, thirty-one. Williams and Thompson withdrew and Briggs was chosen by acclamation. The election for Iowa's first governor was held on October 28, 1846, with Briggs winning with 7,626 votes over his opponent Thomas McKnight, a Dubuque lawyer running on a Whig ticket, who received 7,379 votes. On December 28, 1846, Iowa became the 29th state in the Union when President James K. Polk signed Iowa's admission bill into law.

In the cause of inauguration, Governor Briggs said, "From my want of experience in the affairs of civil administration, I must naturally feel a great degree of embarrassment in my present position; but that feeling will be greatly lessened from the hope and belief which I entertain, that in your character of representatives of an enlightened constituency, you will kindly extend to me your aid and indulgence." True to his campaign promise of no outsider influence, he sold his contracts with the Post Office Department and his administration was praised as, "one void of any special interest . . .exhibited an independence of principle, characteristic of his nature". During his term, the formation of the state government was initiated and a state school system was organized. Briggs's administration laid the groundwork of Iowa transportation infrastructure: planning and building roads, bridges, and railroads. The Missouri-Iowa boundary dispute which caused a great deal of excited controversy and even almost resorted to arms was resolved in 1848 with the help of his skillful diplomacy. When his term ended in 1850, Briggs retired from state politics.

== Later life ==
After his term as Governor ended Briggs returned to his residence and businesses in Jackson County, Iowa. In 1854, Briggs became an early investor in the Florence Land Company of the Nebraska Territory and was one of the founders of the town of Florence, Nebraska.

He became involved in parts farther west in the country: in 1860, he made a trip to Colorado during the mining excitement of the time and in 1863, Briggs with his son John Shannon Briggs and a large group went to the state of Montana, where he remained involved in mining until 1865 when he returned to Iowa. In 1870 he moved to Council Bluffs, Iowa. In 1881 after a very brief illness Briggs died at his son John's residence in Omaha, Nebraska, due to ulceration of the stomach. His death was greatly mourned all over Iowa. Governor Gear issued a proclamation reciting his services to the State, and ordering half-hour guns to be fired and the national flag on the State capitol to be put at half-mast during the day of the funeral. In 1909, the General Assembly of Iowa voted to erect a monument in Andrew, Iowa, to "the stage driver who became Governor."

Although he was originally buried in Omaha, he was re-interred in 1909 in the Andrew Cemetery in Andrew, Iowa.

== Family ==
Briggs was married twice. His first wife, Nancy M. Dunlap, whom he married on November 11, 1830, died December 30, 1847; out of their five children only one lived to adulthood. On October 27, 1849, he married a widow, who died in 1859; together they had no children but Briggs took her three children from previous marriage into his household.

== Legacy ==
Born in Vermont, Ansel Briggs through his life lived in the states of Ohio, Iowa, Nebraska, Colorado, and Montana joining the western march to settle and develop new lands. He farmed with his father, was a stagecoach driver, became engaged in mining and land developing. Briggs early realized importance of public service and held different public offices, from sheriff to a member of the Iowa Territorial House of Representatives eventually becoming the first Governor of Iowa. As a public servant, he earned "a reputation for dedication, frugality, and honesty." While Governor of Iowa, he oversaw the formation of the government bodies of Iowa, the state's school system, and diplomatically avoided an armed border dispute with the state of Missouri. Content with his accomplishments as governor, he declined running for a second term and returned to his business interests.

== See also ==
- History of Iowa

Party political offices
First	Democratic nominee for Governor of Iowa; 1846	Succeeded by Stephen P. Hempstead
Political offices
Preceded by Joseph Clarke; Territorial Governor	Governor of Iowa; December 3, 1846 – December 4, 1850	Succeeded by Stephen P. Hempstead
