= Stephen P. Hempstead =

American politician

Stephen Hempstead

2nd Governor of Iowa
- In office December 4, 1850 – December 9, 1854
- Preceded by: Ansel Briggs
- Succeeded by: James W. Grimes

Judge Dubuque County, Iowa
- In office 1855–1867

Auditor of Dubuque County, Iowa
- In office 1869–1873

Personal details
- Born: October 1, 1812 New London, Connecticut, U.S.
- Died: February 16, 1883 (aged 70) Dubuque, Iowa, U.S.
- Party: Democratic
- Spouse: Lavinia Moore Lackland
- Children: 6

Military service
- Allegiance: United States
- Years of service: 1831-1832
- Battles/wars: Black Hawk War

Stephen P. Hempstead (October 1, 1812 – February 16, 1883) was the second governor of Iowa. A Democrat, he served from 1850 to 1854.

== Life ==
Hempstead was born on October 1, 1812, in New London, Connecticut. He is the eighth son of Joseph and Celinda Hempstead. At the age of thirteen, Stephen Hempstead's family moved to St. Louis and settled a farm. After discovering his dislike of farm life, Hempstead left the farm in 1830 to work in a store in Illinois. Soon after, Stephen was enlisted in the Black Hawk War, where he served in the artillery company until the conflict was resolved.

After the war, Hempstead studied law in Jacksonville. In 1836, he was admitted to the bar, and soon became the first practicing lawyer in Dubuque. In 1837, Hempstead married a woman from Baltimore named Lavinia Moore Lackland, and together they had three sons and three daughters.

== Political life ==
Hempstead moved to the Iowa territory, and was active in politics in the years leading up to Iowa's gaining statehood. Hempstead represented the northern parts of Iowa in the Territorial Legislature at Burlington, Iowa. Hempstead represented Dubuque County in the Iowa constitutional convention in 1846. Hempstead was subsequently elected as governor in 1850. In 1851, he helped write the laws which would form the basis of the Iowa code. Hempstead was elected to the Legislative Council of the First Legislative Assembly of Territorial Iowa. During this first assembly, Hempstead suggested that Iowa's government be located in Johnson County, where Iowa City currently is. In the second assembly, Hempstead is elected to lead the Legislative council as president. He continued to head the Legislative Council until 1848, where Hempstead was elected as one of the three commissioners in charge of revising Iowa's laws. These revisions were accepted into Iowa's law in 1851.

In 1850, Hempstead ran for governor under the democratic ticket with a strong emphasis on bringing African-American slaves to the Dubuque area. He ran against Whig candidate James L. Thompson, and Hempstead ended up winning the election. Hempstead served as governor from 1850 through 1854. Under Hempstead, Iowa's population considerably increased after Hempstead strongly encouraged incomers to live in Iowa. Fifty two new counties were also formed while Hempstead was in office, and the state of Iowa practiced financial conservation. Hempstead also strongly opposed banks, which was reflected in his actions while in office. The Iowa Constitution of 1846 prohibited banking in Iowa, and twice Hempstead vetoed any attempt to appeal this law. Temperance was also a large issue under Hempstead. Many prohibition supporters petitioned in favor of prohibition in Iowa, but Hempstead simply took no action, and left this issue up to local authorities.

== Post-gubernatorial career ==
When Hempstead's term as governor ended on December 9, 1854, he attempted to run for the United States congress, but lost due to his opinion over prohibition. Later, Hempstead was repeatedly elected starting in 1855 and served as Dubuque's county judge until 1867. Hempstead also served as an auditor in Dubuque from the year 1869 until 1873, and also was honored as justice of the peace in 1882 until his death in 1883.

The creation of Dubuque's city hall was led by Hempstead while he was in office. Hempstead hired the architect John F. Rague to design the city hall. Rague modeled Dubuque's city hall after New York's Fulton Street Market building and Boston's Faneuil Hall. The first floor of the building was intended to be used as a market for the local farmers to sell their goods. The second floor contained the main city court room, offices, and council chamber. The town hall was located on the third floor, where the public could gather to host events. This building still stands today.

In the 1960's, a public high school was named after him in Dubuque, Stephen Hempstead High School.

Party political offices
Preceded by Ansel Briggs	Democratic nominee for Governor of Iowa; 1850	Succeeded by Curtis Bates
Political offices
Preceded by Ansel Briggs	Governor of Iowa; December 4, 1850 – December 9, 1854	Succeeded by James W. Grimes
