= History of Iowa =

Native Americans in the United States have resided in what is now Iowa for thousands of years. The written history of Iowa begins with the proto-historic accounts of Native Americans by explorers such as Marquette and Joliet in the 1680s. Until the early 19th century Iowa was occupied exclusively by Native Americans and a few European traders, with loose political control by France and Spain.

Iowa became part of the United States of America after the Louisiana Purchase in 1803, but uncontested U.S. control over what is now Iowa occurred only after the War of 1812 and after a series of treaties eliminated Indian claims on the state. Beginning in the 1830s Euro-American settlements appeared in the Iowa Territory, U.S. statehood was acquired in 1846, and by 1860 almost the entire state was settled and farmed by Euro-Americans. Subsistence frontier farming was replaced by commodity farming after the construction of railroad networks in the 1850s and 1860s. Iowa contributed many soldiers who fought in the American Civil War. Afterwards they returned to help transform Iowa into an agricultural powerhouse, supplying food to the rest of the nation.

The industrialization of agriculture and the emergence of centralized commodities markets in the late 19th and 20th centuries led to a shift towards larger farms and the decline of the small family farm; this was exacerbated during the Great Depression. Industrial production became a larger part of the economy during World War II and the postwar economic boom. In the 1970s and 1980s a series of economic shocks, including the oil crisis, the 1980s farm crisis, and the Early 1980s recession led to the collapse of commodities prices, a decline in rural and state population, and rural flight. Iowa's economy rebounded in the 1990s, emerging as a modern mixed economy dominated by industry, commerce, and finance, in which agriculture is a comparatively small component.

== Prehistory ==
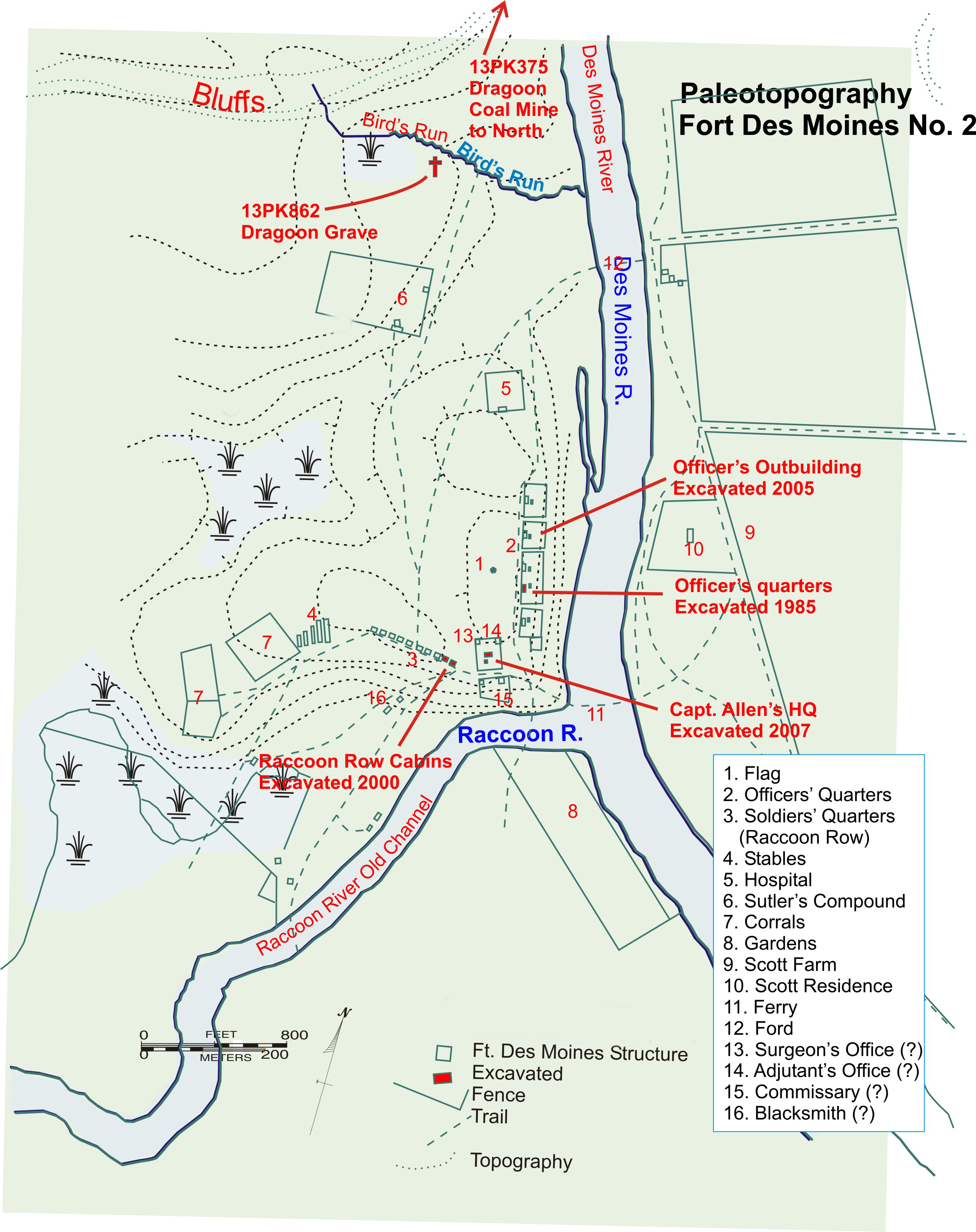
Prehistoric and historic Indian sites in Downtown Des Moines

About 21,000 to 16,000 years ago, Iowa's climate was arctic, and about 12,000 years ago the ice sheets in Iowa began to melt. When the American Indians first arrived (in what is now Iowa) thousands of years ago they would hunt and gather living in a Pleistocene glacial landscape. It is estimated that the first settlement had around 1,000 to 2,000 inhabitants. By the time European colonists visited Iowa, Native Americans were largely settled farmers with complex economic, social, and political systems. This transformation happened gradually. During the Archaic period (more than 2,800 years ago), Native Americans adapted to local environments and ecosystems, slowly becoming more sedentary as populations increased. More than 3,000 years ago, during the Late Archaic period, they began domesticating plants. The subsequent Woodland period saw an increase on the reliance on agriculture and social complexity, with increased use of mounds, ceramics, and more intensive agriculture. Iowa at the time was part of the periphery of the Hopewell Interaction Sphere. During the Mississippian period (beginning about A.D. 900) increased use of maize and other influences from Mesoamerica led to more extensive agriculture and much larger settlements. During the Misssissippian period, the region was part of the Oneota culture. The arrival of European trade goods and diseases in the Protohistoric period led a dramatic population decline and economic and social upheaval, with the arrival of new peoples and French colonists.

== Early Historic Native Americans ==
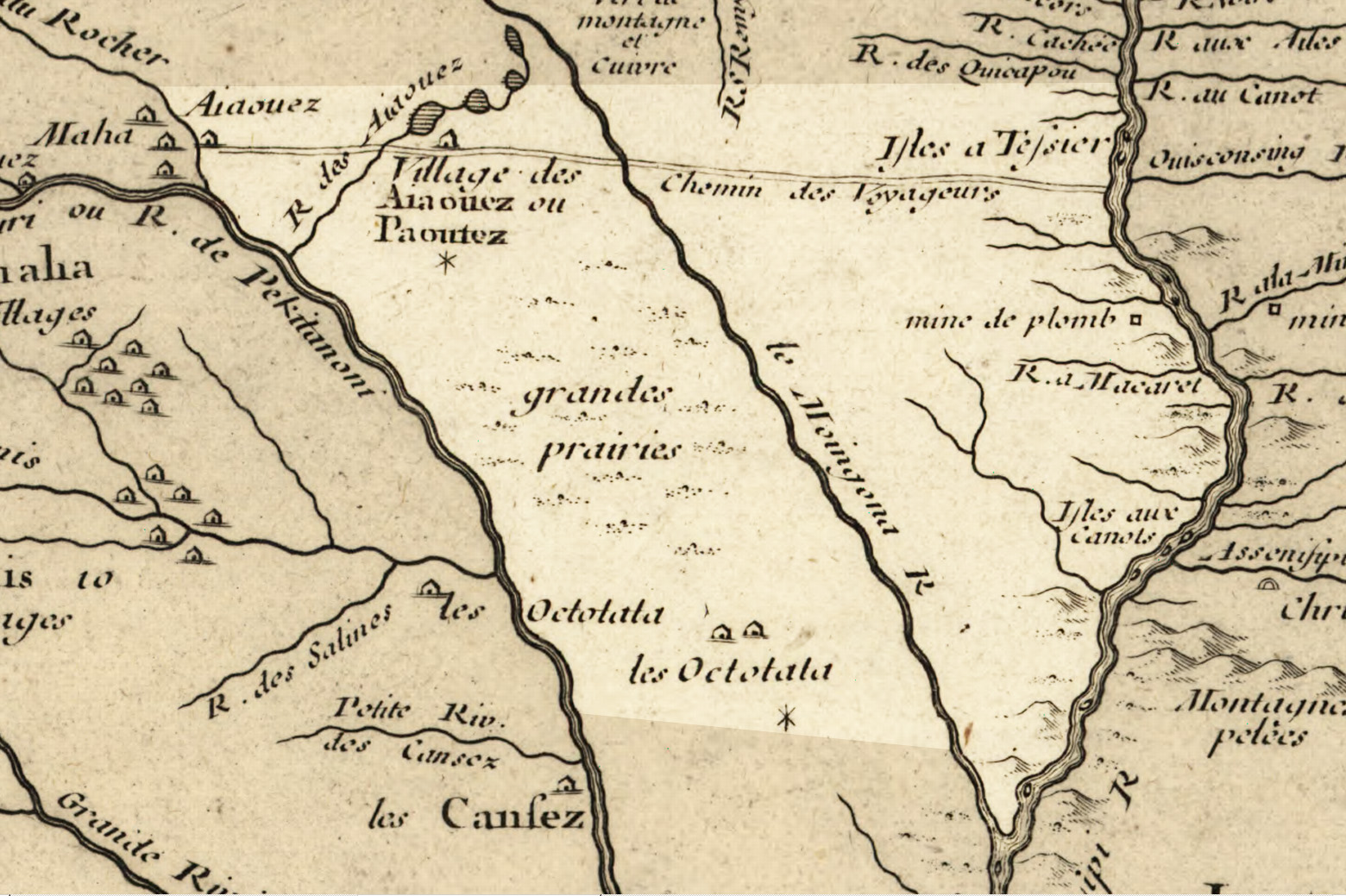
1718 Guillaume Delisle map, showing locations of the Ioway (Aiouez au Pauotez), the Omaha (Maha), the Otoe (Octotata), the Kaw (Cansez) and the main voyageur trail (Chemin des voyageurs).

Iowa is named after the Ioway tribe which inhabited the land since the 1600s. The French forced the Sauk and Meskwaki tribes out of the Great Lakes region and into Iowa in the 1700s. By 1804, there were a number of Native American groups in Iowa: the Sauk (Sac) and Meskwaki (Fox) on the eastern edge of Iowa along the Mississippi; the Ioway along the bank of the Des Moines River; the Otoe, Missouri, and Omaha along the Missouri River, and the Sioux in the Northern and Western parts of the State. Additionally, earlier records indicate the presence of the Illinois in Iowa, though they were nearly gone by the time of the 1804 observations. The total number of these groups in Iowa in 1804 is estimated to be less than 15,000. While these groups generally came initially for food, some of them (e.g., Illinois, Sauk, Meskwaki) immigrated as a result of warfare with other tribes or the French. The early and mid-19th century saw the movement of additional groups of Native Americans into Iowa, such as the Potawatomi and Winnebago, followed by the emigration from Iowa of nearly all Native Americans.

The first European or American to make contact with Native Americans in Iowa is generally considered to be the Frenchmen Louis Joliet and Pere Jacques Marquette, though earlier contact by others is possible. They had set out to discover the Mississippi River, and on June 17, 1673, contacted the Illinois on the eastern side of Iowa. They also were told at that time of the presence of the Sioux along the Missouri. Upon the departure of Joliet and Marquette from the Illinois village, they were accompanied to the riverbank by nearly 600 Illinois, who showed "every possible manifestation of joy", having treated the first Europeans well and offered them peace. In 1682, Rene Robert Cavelier de la Salle claimed the entire Mississippi valley for France and named it Louisiana in honor of King Louis XIV. Additional exploration by early French, British, and American trappers, traders, explorers, and missionaries informs us of the nature of Native American presence in Iowa from this initial contact in 1673 to the start of settlement by the United States.

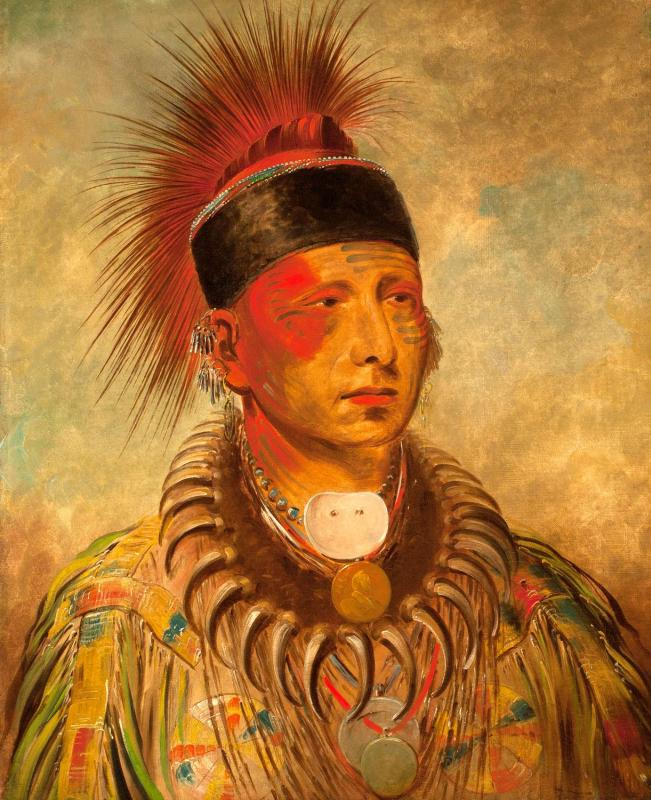
Mahaska (White Cloud), a chief of the Ioway nation

=== Ioway tribe ===
From the late 1600s to mid 1700's, the Ioway tribe lived along the Missouri River, eventually moving to southeast Iowa. There was an estimated 1,000 to 1,500 inhabitants and was the most powerful tribe in Iowa at the time. The Ioway built their villages in wooded areas near rivers with good soil for farming. They stored corn, squash, beans, and other foods in pits.

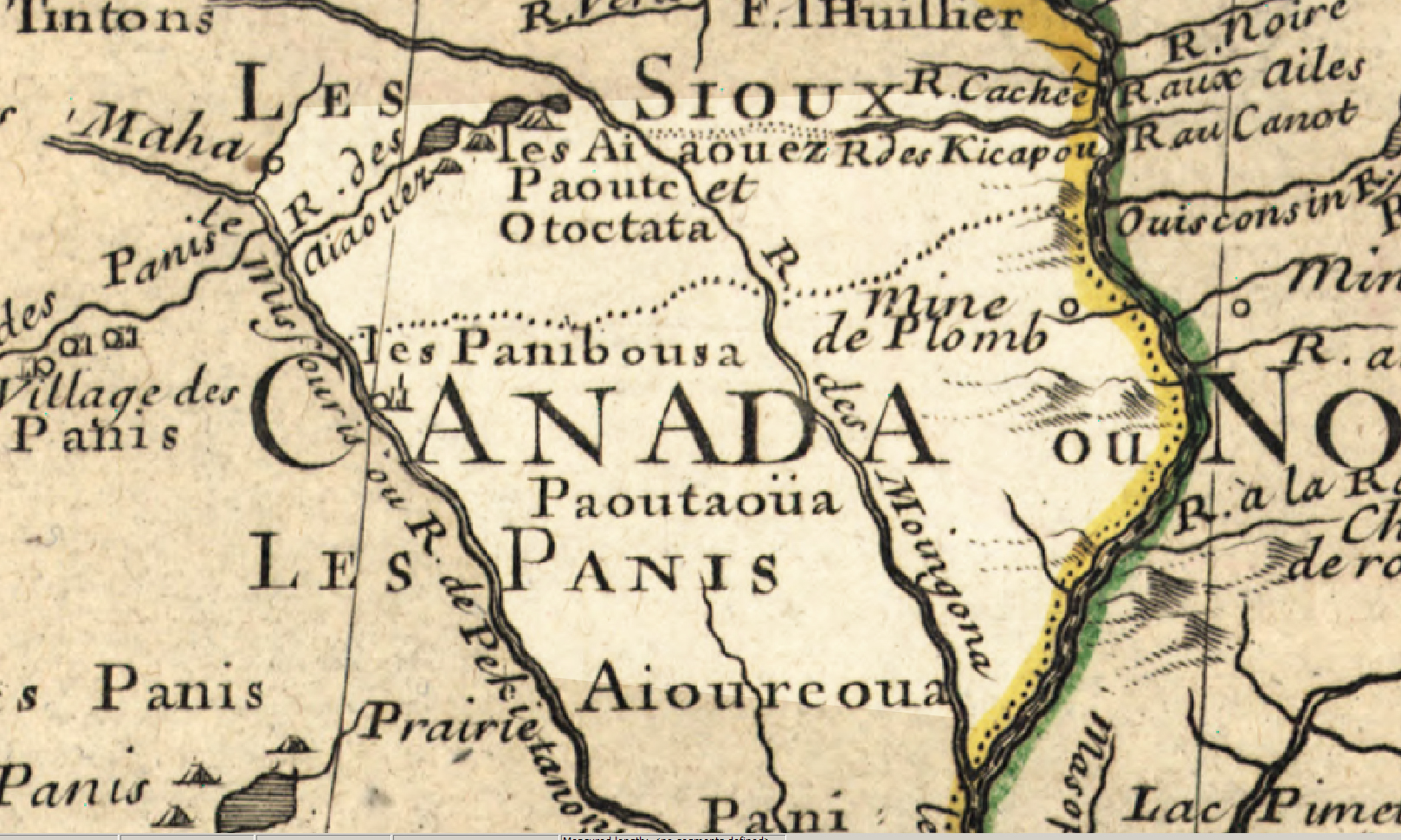
Iowa, 1798, showing several tribes, including Pawnee (Panis/Panibousa), Ioway (Aiaouez/Aioureoua and Paoute/Paoutaoua), Dakota (Sioux), and Omaha (Maha); approximate state highlighted.

Women cooked in clay pots, and families ate with bowls and spoons made from bison horns. After interaction with European traders, they also used metal bowls and spoons to eat. It wasn't until the 1720s when they used horses brought in by other plains tribes. In the 1760s they were forced to move west due to threats of attacks from the Sioux who acquired European weapons. The Ioway took part in the fur trade with France and Britain in the early 1800s. French traders from St. Louis also visited the tribe, sometimes marrying Ioway women to improve chances at success in the fur trade. The tribe had many troubles with other tribes in Iowa in the early 1800s. Disputed over territory caused raids to take place against the Suak and Meskwaki. In search for buffalo, the tribe started hunting in Omaha and Osage territory, causing an attack from the Omaha in 1814. Another small-pox epidemic killed off around a quarter to a half of the tribe, leaving only around 800 people left. In the early 1800s, the Ioway left Iowa and fled into Missouri, and later into Nebraska. The tribe tried starting a petition to move back to Des Moines, but President Andrew Jackson ignored the petition, marking the end of the tribe in Iowa. In 1824, an estimated 4,800 people lived in Saukenuk, the main village of the Sauk and Meskwaki.

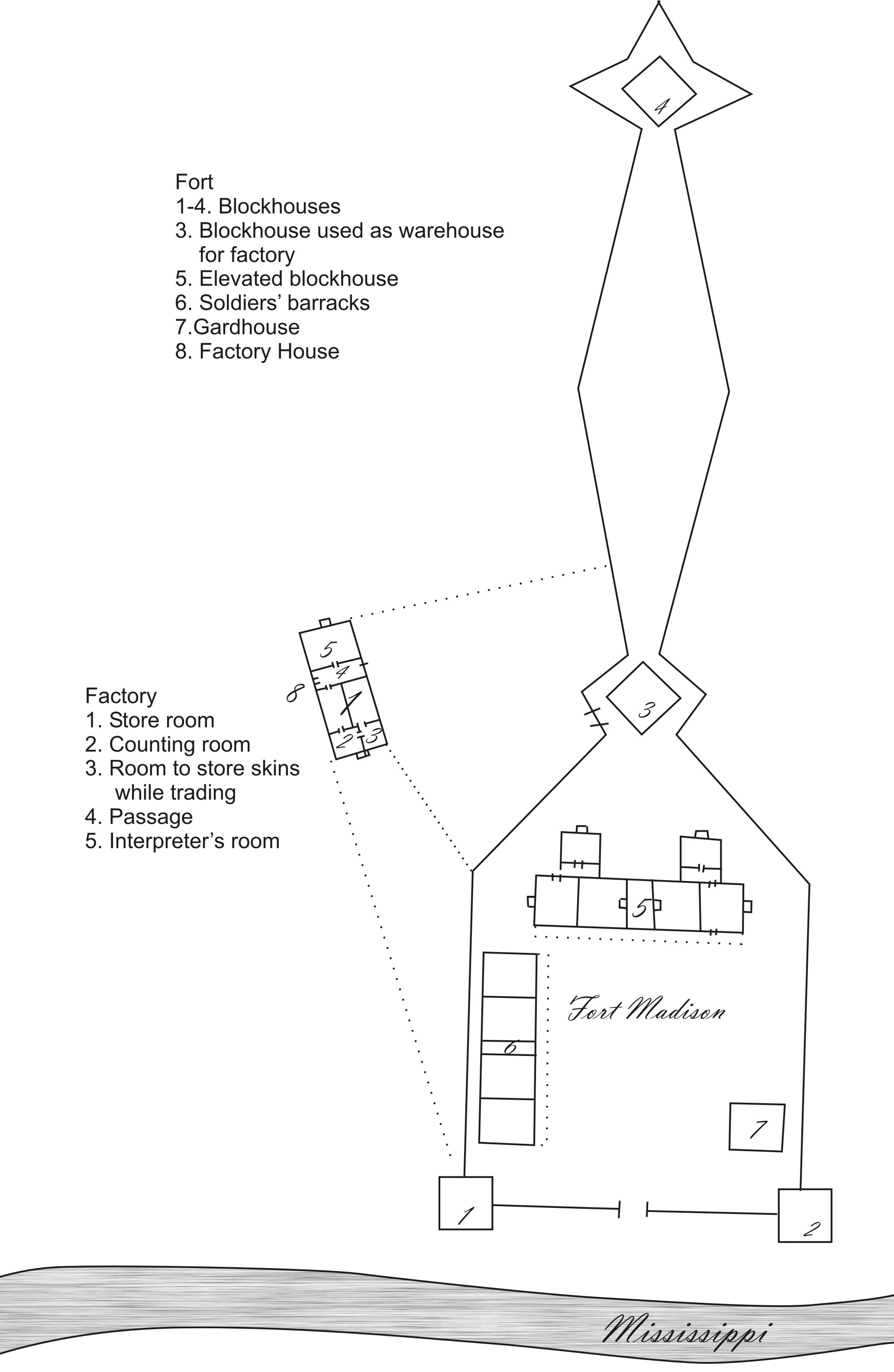
Fort Madison (1808–1813), the scene of Iowa's only military battle

=== Sauk and Meskwaki tribes ===
The Sauk and Meskwaki constituted the largest and most powerful tribes in the Upper Mississippi Valley after the Ioway relocated. They had earlier moved from the Michigan region into Wisconsin and by the 1730s, they had relocated in western Illinois due to the French attacking the nations. By 1732, only 140 Meskwaki survived and found refuge with the Sauk. There they established their villages along the Rock and Mississippi Rivers.

They lived in their main villages only for a few months each year. At other times, they travelled throughout western Illinois and eastern Iowa hunting, fishing, and gathering food and materials with which to make domestic articles. Every spring, the two tribes travelled northward into Minnesota where they tapped maple trees and made syrup. In the late 1700s, Julien Dubuque convinced the Meskwaki leader to mine for land near present-day Dubuque. Dubuque married a local woman and was incorporated into the tribe. He brought French labourers and Meskwaki women to help run the mines. Fort Madison was constructed in 1808 to control trade along the Mississippi, and to prevent the reoccupation of the area by the British; Fort Madison was defeated in 1813 by British-allied Indians during the War of 1812 and was the site of Iowa's only true military battle. The Sauk leader Black Hawk first fought against the U.S. at Fort Madison.

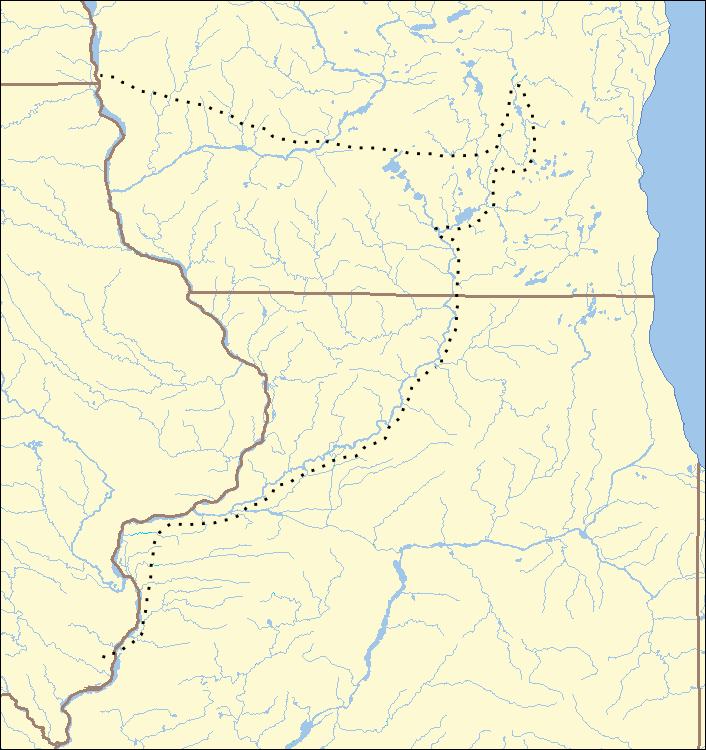
The path the Sauk took during the Black Hawk War

=== Black Hawk War ===
In 1829, the federal government informed the two tribes that they must leave their villages in western Illinois and move across the Mississippi River into the Iowa region. The federal government claimed ownership of the Illinois land as a result of Quashquame's Treaty of 1804. The move was made but not without violence. Black Hawk, a highly respected Sauk leader, protested the move and in 1832 returned to reclaim the Illinois village of Saukenuk with 1,600 men. May 14, 1832 officially started the Black Hawk War after Black Hawk sent men under a flag of truce wanting to talk to the militia. The Illinois militia, which was made up of volunteers, opened fire on the men and the survivors fled. For the next three months, the Illinois militia pursued Black Hawk and his band of approximately four hundred Indians northward along the eastern side of the Mississippi River. On August 2, 1832, an American steamboat found the remaining Sauk people on the Bad Axe River in Wisconsin and opened fire even after Black Hawk raised a white flag. Their numbers having dwindled to about two hundred. As punishment for their resistance, the federal government required the Sauk and Meskwaki to relinquish some of their land in eastern Iowa. This land, known as the Black Hawk Purchase, constituted a strip fifty miles wide lying along the Mississippi River, stretching from the Missouri border to approximately Fayette and Clayton Counties in Northeastern Iowa. Black Hawk and a few other tribal members were captured by the Ho-Chunk and brought to St. Louis. In 1833, they were brought to Washington, D.C. and told by President Andrew Jackson to be peaceful or face destruction.

=== Last cessions ===
There were additional cessions by the Sauk and Meskwaki in 1837 (the "Second Black Hawk Purchase") and 1842 (the "New Purchase"), so that by 1845 nearly all had left Iowa. Similarly, other Native American groups gave up their Iowa land via treaties with the United States. Western Iowa was ceded by a group of tribes including the Missouria, Omaha, and Otoe in 1830. The Ioway ceded the last of their Iowa lands in 1838. The Winnebago and Potawatomi, who had only a short time before been removed to Iowa, were yet again removed and had left Iowa by 1848 and 1846, respectively. The last remaining group, the Sioux, ceded their last Iowa land via an 1851 treaty with the United States, which they completed in 1852.

=== Present day ===
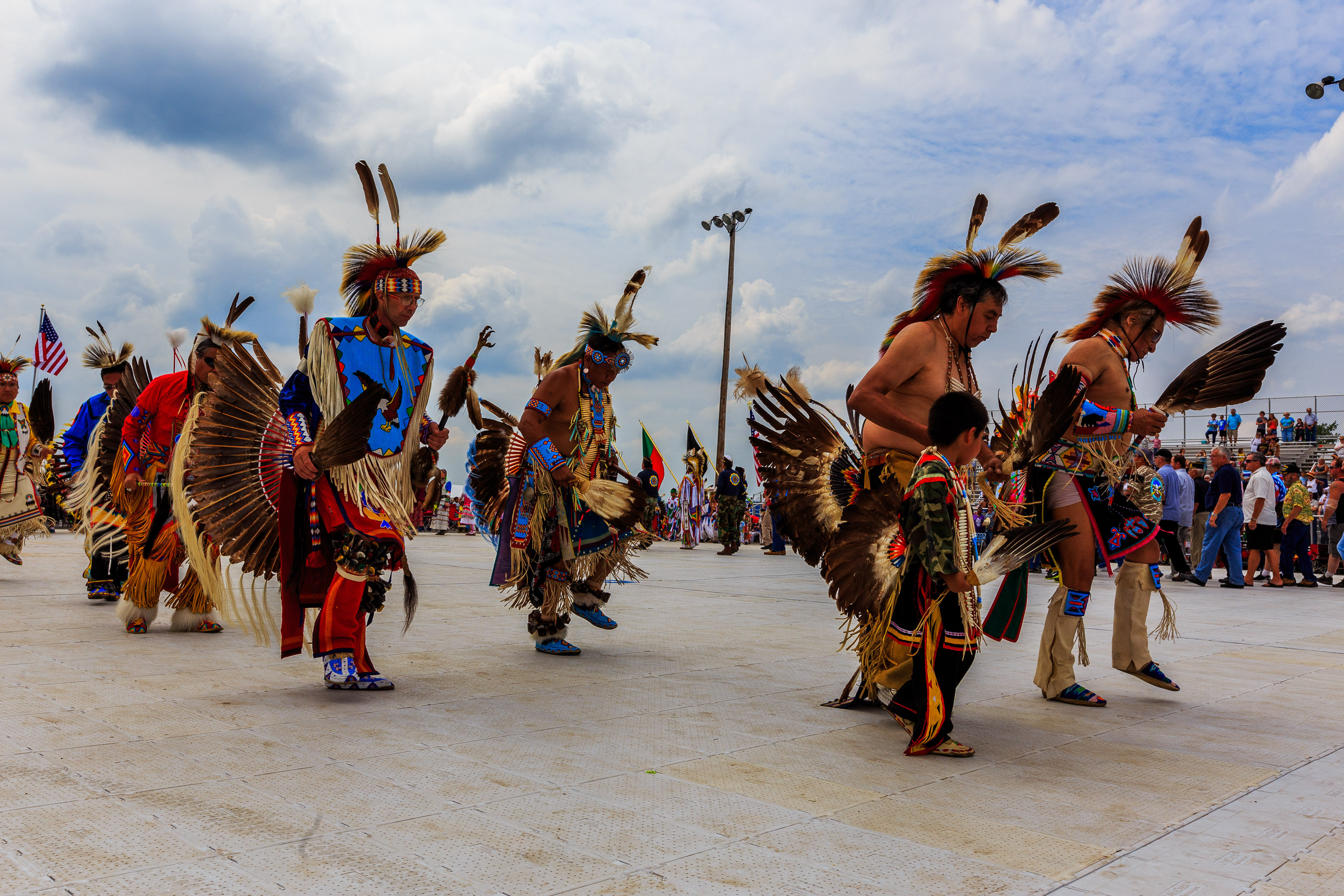
Members of the Meskwaki nation dancing at the 100th annual Pow Wow

Today, Iowa is still home to one American Indian group, the Meskwaki, who reside on the Meskwaki Settlement in Tama County. After most Sauk and Meskwaki members had been removed from the state, some Meskwaki tribal members, along with a few Sauk, returned to hunt and fish in eastern Iowa. The Indians then approached Governor James Grimes with the request that they be allowed to purchase back some of their original land. They collected $735 for their first land purchase and today they have approximately 8,600 acres (34.8 km^{2}) of land.

== Euro-American settlers ==
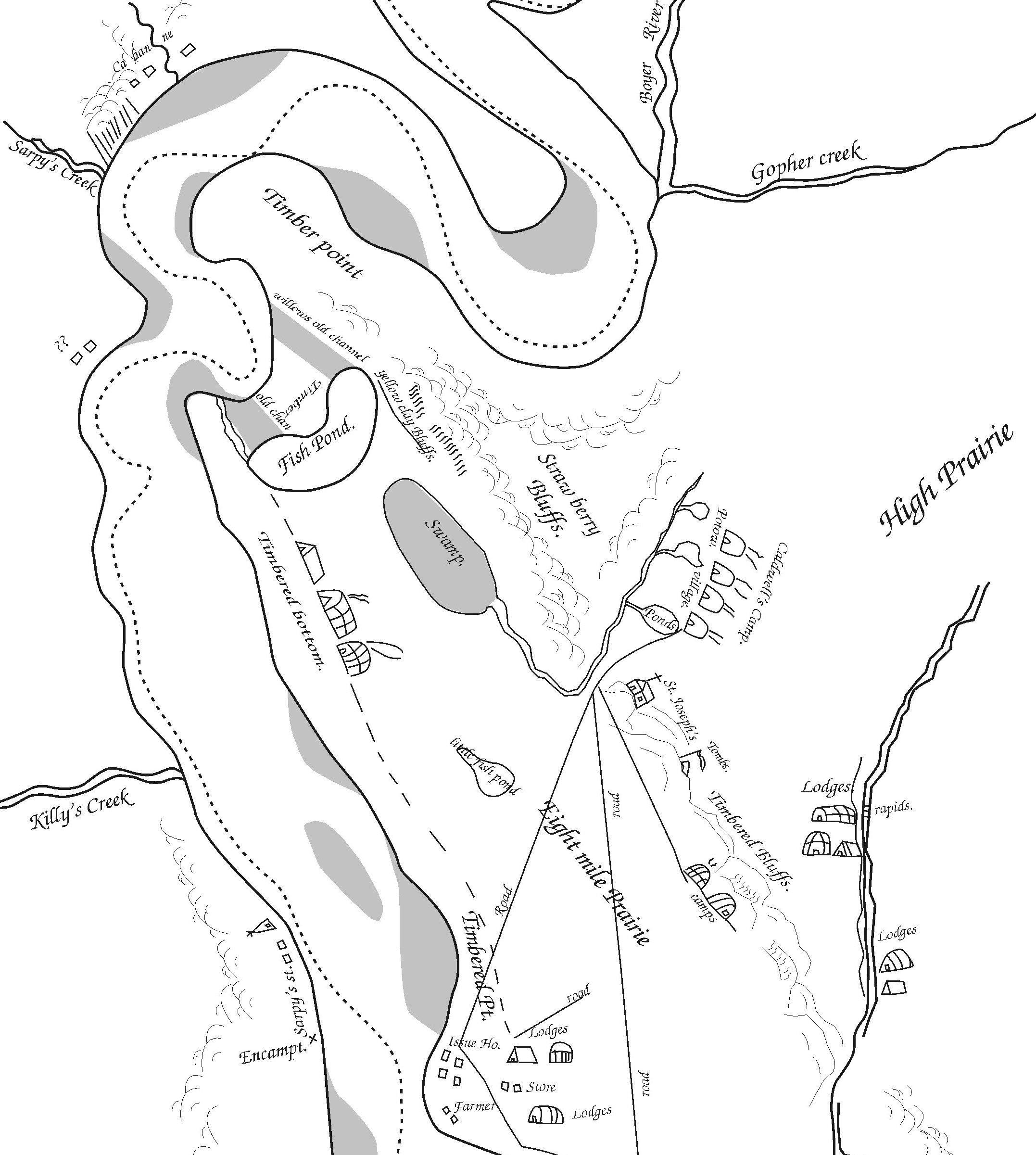
Pierre-Jean De Smet's map of the Council Bluffs area (1839), showing Native American villages and early American settlement

The Black Hawk Purchase opened up the lands of Iowa to settlers for the first time, and "official" settlement began pursuant to this on June 1, 1833. More than 96,000 people moved into the new Iowa Territory. Before the opening of these lands, there were likely only 40–50 Americans then settled in Iowa. Many of those who settled before June 1, 1833, were at the Native American villages of Ahwipetuk (now Nashville) and Puckeshetuk (now Keokuk). Many of the pre-1833 settlers were trappers and traders, though some came to mine. settlers were French, as the land was originally under French jurisdiction. They came to trade fur, preach, discover mines, and explore, and were generally transient. A few, however, secured land grants and settled in the area when Iowa was under Spanish jurisdiction. The first settler appears to have been Julien Dubuque, a French-Canadian man who arrived at the lead mines near modern-day Dubuque in 1787. He obtained permission to mine the land from the Meskwaki, who generously stated that he could work the mines "as long as he shall please." Additional early Spanish grants include a grant of land near Montrose to Louis Honore in 1799, and of land near McGregor to Basil Giard in 1796.

Euro-American settlement in Iowa was generally sparse before the lands opened in 1833. Most of the immigrants who came shortly after this time were from other states, especially Illinois, Indiana, Ohio, Missouri, Kentucky, and Tennessee, and to a lesser extent New York, Pennsylvania, Virginia, and the Carolinas. Families moving to Iowa originally brought wheat to plant, but became expensive to move due to the weight. Farmers began bringing corn instead, causing corn production to grow in the state.

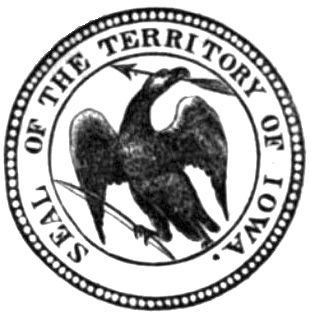
Iowa Territorial Seal

The settlers soon discovered an environment different from that which they had known back East. Most northeastern and southeastern states were heavily timbered; settlers there had material for building homes, outbuildings, and fences. Moreover, wood also provided ample fuel. Once past the extreme eastern portion of Iowa, settlers quickly discovered that the state was primarily a prairie or tall grass region. Trees grew abundantly in the extreme eastern and southeastern portions, and along rivers and streams, but elsewhere timber was limited.

In most portions of eastern and central Iowa, settlers could find sufficient timber for construction of log cabins, but substitute materials had to be found for fuel and fencing. For fuel, they turned to dried prairie hay, corn cobs, and dried animal droppings. In southern Iowa, early settlers found coal outcroppings along rivers and streams. People moving into northwest Iowa, an area also devoid of trees, constructed sod houses. Some of the early sod house residents wrote in glowing terms about their new quarters, insisting that "soddies" were not only cheap to build but were warm in the winter and cool in the summer. They did not praise the bugs, the smells, or the ever-present dirt, dampness and darkness. Settlers experimented endlessly with substitute fencing materials. Some residents built stone fences; some constructed dirt ridges; others dug ditches. The most successful fencing material was the Osage orange hedge until the 1870s when the invention of barbed wire provided farmers with satisfactory fencing material.

Most river towns in Iowa were made up of labourers, fugitives, military deserters, and other European immigrants. Gambling and shootings were common at the time. Most immigrants wanted to work in mines due to the high wages they would receive. Annual lead production eventually reached 55 million pounds by 1848, with Dubuque making 9.8 million pounds of lead in the year prior.

== Iowa Territory ==
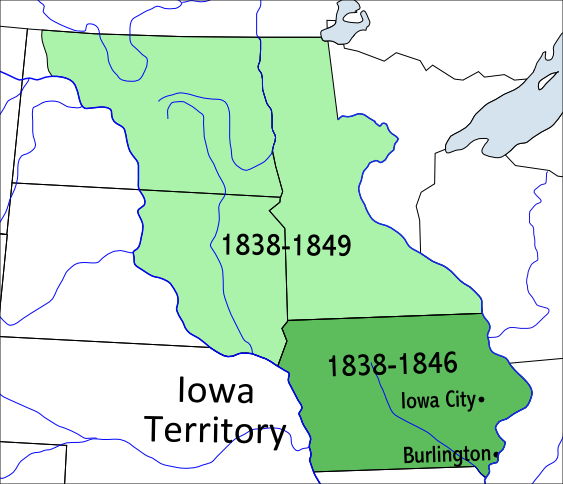
The Iowa Territory

Iowa was part of Michigan Territory for 2 years, then in 1836 became part of the Wisconsin Territory. The Iowa Territory was established on July 4, 1838. As the settlers came into Iowa, they naturally established communities. Significant of these were Burlington, Dubuque, Davenport, Keokuk, Fort Madison, and Muscatine. By 1836, when the first census was taken in Iowa, there were 10,531 inhabitants. By 1838 there were 22,895 people.

Robert Lucas was the first governor of the Iowa Territory after being appointed by Martin Van Buren in 1838. Van Buren also appointed judges, an attorney, and a marshal, with more than half of them being from southern states. They imposed harsh restrictions on African Americans, not letting them be able to vote or go to school, and needing a $500 bond to enter the territory.

=== Slavery ===
In 1840, only 188 African Americans lived in the Iowa Territory. Most African Americans lived on the Mississippi River and worked as labourers. The majority lived in Dubuque, with 72 living there, making up 5% of the town. 16 of the 188 were listed as slaves in 1840, but some owners mislabelled their slaves in the census, labelling them as "free colored". John Chambers, the second governor of the territory, brought 2 slaves with him when he moved to the Iowa Territory. Eventually when Chambers left the territory, both of his slaves, Cassius and Carey Bennett, claimed their freedom and refused to leave. Even though slavery was tolerated, it was not widely used. One slave owner from Keokuk moved across the Des Moines River to escape criticism from his neighbours about owning a slave.

In 1834, Ralph, an enslaved man, came to work at mines in Dubuque to pay for his freedom. Ralph was born in 1795 in Virginia as Rafe Nelson, but took the last name of his enslaver, William Montgomery after moving to Missouri. Montgomery allowed him to work in the Iowa Territory to pay back his freedom in 5 years. After 5 years passed, he wasn't able to pay it back, so Montgomery put a $100 bounty on Ralph. In 1839, two bounty hunters found Ralph captured him. The two bounty hunters swore to a Sheriff that Ralph was a fugitive, so the Sheriff arrested Ralph and sent him to a riverboat. A nearby merchant, Alexander Butterworth, saw the kidnapping and was able to get a writ of habeas corpus from judge T. S. Wilson. Ralph was rescued from the boat right before departure. His case was the second to come to the Iowa Supreme Court but was the first to be decided. The court ruled that Ralph was a free man on July 4, 1839.

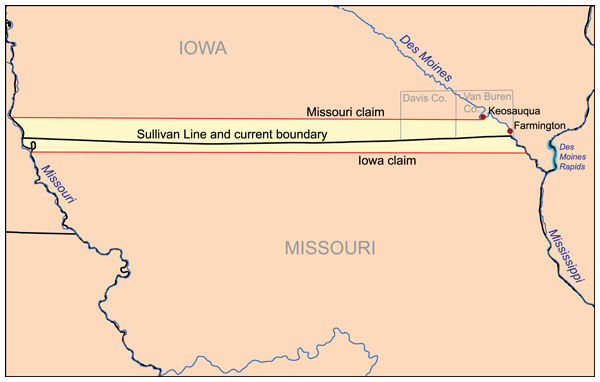
The land disputed between Iowa and Missouri during the Honey War

=== Honey War ===
The first surveys in Iowa started in the fall of 1836. A group led by William Burt surveyed 72 miles (116 km) in 8 days. They only got paid $2.75 a mile ($85 in 2020), which often led to surveys being rushed. Flooding, harsh weather, and mosquitoes also hindered the surveys, but even without these events, the surveys were not well made. This eventually led to the Honey War with Missouri in 1839. A careless surveyor left an uncertain border with Missouri, so when a surveyor from Missouri decided the border was too far south, he extended the border north, giving Missouri an extra 2,616 square miles (6,780 km^{2}). In August 1839, Missouri Sheriff Uriah Gregory, tried collecting taxes in the disputed land. Iowans refused to pay, and when Gregory came back with several hundred men, he was arrested for trespassing. The Missouri governor called the militia, and impatient Missourians cut down bee trees, which gave the conflict its name. Some Iowans headed south, armed with pitchforks, bats, and shotguns, only to desert the disputed territory the night after. Both sides backed down and the supreme court favored the original border set by Iowa, ending the conflict.

=== Mormons ===
In 1846, Mormon migrants started travelling through southern Iowa from Illinois after their prophet, Joseph Smith, was murdered to escape persecution and head towards Utah. These migrants faced cold weather and diseases such as scurvy and malaria. When it was freezing, pathways turned into mud, allowing migrants to travel only a few miles a day. Once they arrived to the Missouri River, they had to stay another winter in Iowa. 500 Mormon men volunteered to fight in the Mexican War, and became known as the Mormon Battalion. Thousands of Mormons continued to emigrate to Utah through Iowa decades later, taking railroad lines to Iowa City then walking the rest of the way to Utah.

=== Admission to the United States ===
Robert Lucas suggested a state constitution be written in 1839, but the legislature ignored him. In 1841, John Chambers also suggested statehood for Iowa Territory, but was also rejected. After more settlers moved in, the idea of Iowa becoming a state became more common. At the time Florida was wanting to become a state, but the United States wanted a free state and a slave state to be admitted at the same time so there would be equal representation in congress. In December 1842, Chambers proposed another vote on statehood and was accepted by legislature. In April 1843, voters endorsed the idea. The convention began in Iowa City on October 7, 1844, with two-thirds of the delegates being born in northern states.

Before Iowa was admitted, the House of Representatives cut the Iowa Territory into one-third the size it originally was so that more states could be carved out of the Louisiana Territory. Congress approved, with Florida and Iowa becoming the next two states. Florida became a state in March 1845, but Iowa didn't become a state until 2 years later due to voters being unhappy about the recent border changes. A new convention for the constitution was held a year later, and in August 1846, the new constitution was ratified. On December 28, 1846, Iowa became a state, with a population of 96,000 people. The first governor, Ansel Briggs, was sworn in 25 days before Iowa became a state. Iowa didn't send any senators to Washington D.C. due to a deadlock from the Whig and Democratic parties. It took until the second general assembly to send two Democratic senators, George W. Jones and Augustus C. Dodge.

== Railroad Construction ==
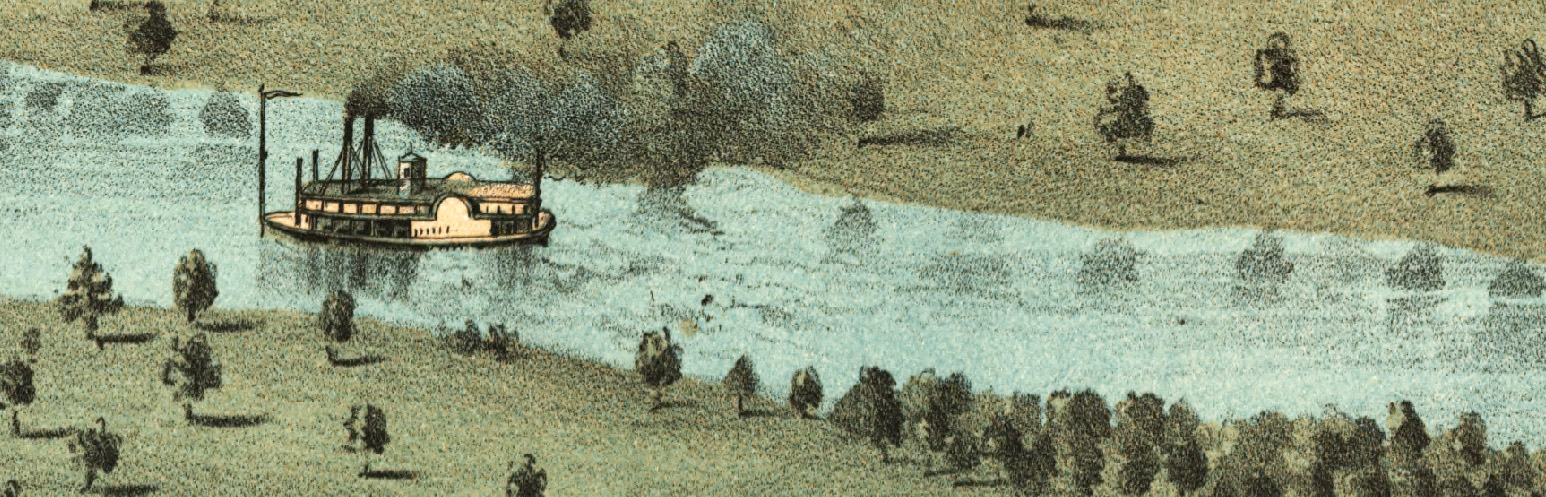
A painting of a steamboat in Iowa City in 1868

As thousands of settlers poured into Iowa in the mid-19th century, all shared a common concern for the development of adequate transportation. The earliest settlers shipped their agricultural goods down the Mississippi River to New Orleans, Louisiana. Steamboats were in widespread use on the Mississippi and major rivers by the 1850s. In the 1850s, Iowans had caught the nation's railroad fever. By 1860, Chicago, Illinois was served by almost a dozen lines and had become the regional hub.

In 1855 there was 68 miles (109 km) of railroad placed down in Iowa. By 1860 there was 655 miles (1,054 km). The first railroad bridge to cross the Mississippi River was built in 1856 at Rock Island. Shortly after the bridge was completed, a steamboat crashed into a pier and caught fire. The fire spread to the bridge and was put out of use for 4 months. After the crash, the Supreme Court got involved and decided that bridges can be built across the Mississippi River.

In the early 1850s, city officials in the river communities of Dubuque, Clinton, Davenport, and Burlington began to organize local railroad companies. City officials knew that railroads building west from Chicago would soon reach the Mississippi River opposite the four Iowa cities. With the 1850s, railroad planning took place which eventually resulted in the development of the Illinois Central, the Chicago and North Western Railway, reaching Council Bluffs in 1867. Council Bluffs had been designated as the eastern terminus for the Union Pacific, the railroad that would eventually extend across the western half of the nation and along with the Central Pacific, provide the nation's First transcontinental railroad. A short time later a fifth railroad, the Chicago, Milwaukee, St. Paul and Pacific Railroad, also completed its line across the state.

The completion of five railroads across Iowa brought major economic changes. Of primary importance, Iowans could travel every month of the year. During the later 19th and early 20th centuries, even small Iowa towns had six passenger trains a day. Railroads provided year-round transportation for Iowa's farmers. With Chicago's preeminence as a railroad center, the corn, wheat, beef, and pork raised by Iowa's farmers could be shipped through Chicago, to markets in the U.S. and worldwide.

Railroads made industry possible. Before 1870, Iowa contained some manufacturing firms in river towns. Most new industry were based on food processing or farm machinery. In Cedar Rapids, John and Robert Stuart, along with their cousin, George Douglas, started an oats processing plant. In time, this firm took the name Quaker Oats. Meat packing plants also appeared in the 1870s in different parts of the state: Sinclair Meat Packing opened in Cedar Rapids, Booge and Company started in Sioux City, and John Morrell & Company set up operations in Ottumwa.

The railroads also created a significant demand for coal. Coal mines were quickly opened and expanded wherever the new railroads passed through areas with coal exposures. The Chicago and North Western Railway encouraged development of mines in Boone and Moingona. The Chicago, Milwaukee and St. Paul Railway encouraged similar development in Mystic, Iowa and neighboring coal camps. Where railroads did not have direct access to sufficient coal, long branch lines were built into the coal fields. The Burlington, Cedar Rapids and Northern Railway built a 66-mile branch to What Cheer in 1879, and the Chicago and North Western built a 64-mile branch to its mines in Muchakinock in 1884. By 1899, Iowa's coal mines employed 11,029 men to produce almost 5 million tons of coal per year. In 1919, Iowa had about 240 coal mines that between them produced over 8 million tons of coal per year and employed about 15,000 men.

== American Civil War ==
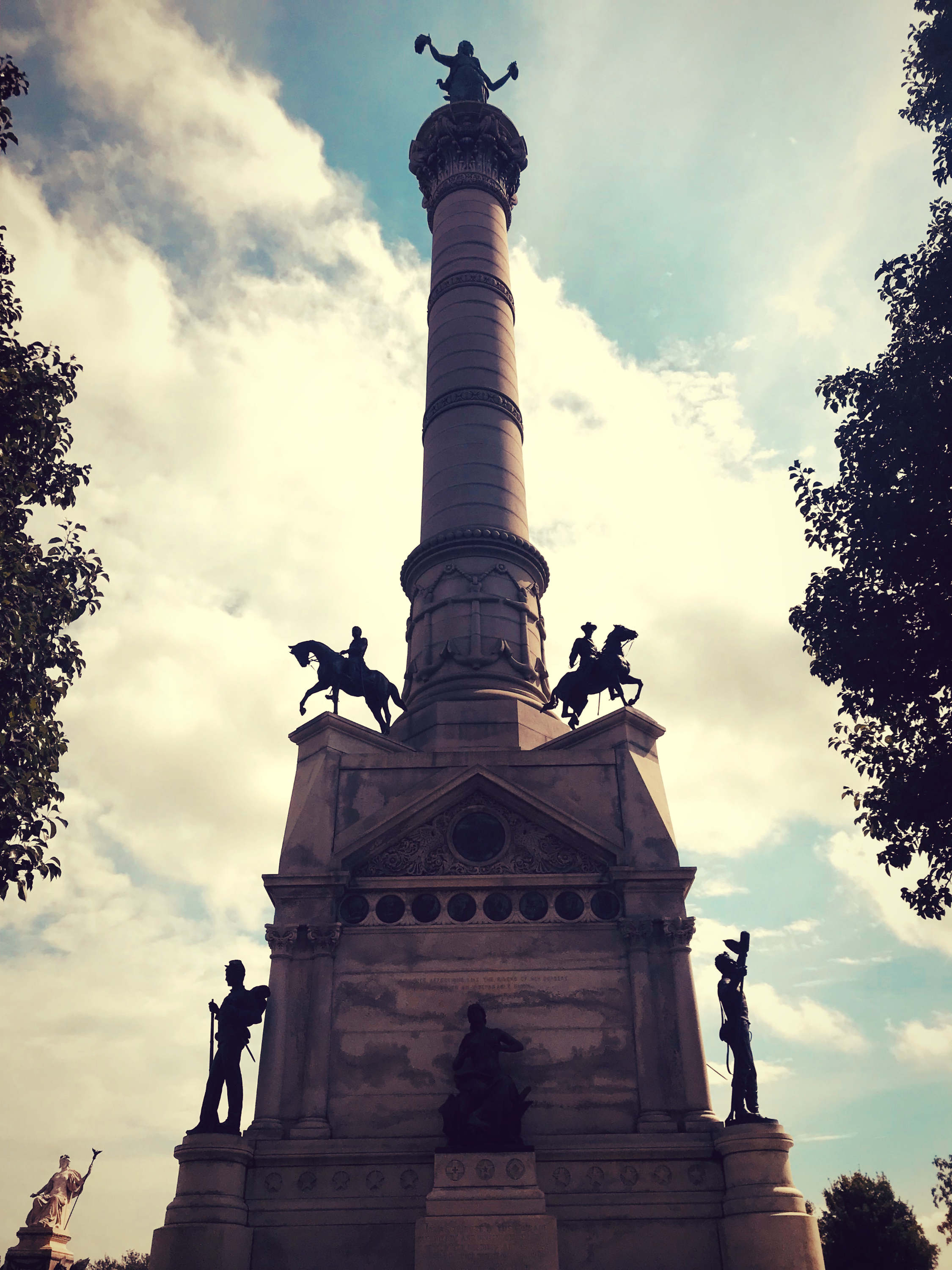
Iowa Civil War Monument on the Capital Grounds in Des Moines

Iowa supported the Union during the American Civil War, voting heavily for Lincoln and the Republicans, There was a strong antiwar "Copperhead" movement among settlers of Southerner origins and among Catholics. There were no battles in the state, but Iowa sent large supplies of food to the armies and the eastern cities. Iowa sent 50 regiments of infantry and cavalry, and 4 artillery batteries. More than 75,000 Iowans served, many in combat units attached to the western armies. 13,001 died of wounds or (two-thirds) of disease. Eight thousand five hundred Iowans were wounded.

On May 19, 1861, Lincoln called for 82,000 more troops from Iowa. These made up the 1st, 2nd, and 3rd Iowa Infantry Regiments, and by early June, all 3 regiments were assembled in Keokuk. In July, all 3 regiments were stationed in Missouri, and by the end of the year there were 12. By the start of 1862, more than 19,000 Iowans joined the war with many serving with Ulysses S. Grant.

=== 37th Iowa Infantry Regiment ===
Iowa recruited a regiment for men over the age of 45 called the graybeards (officially the 37th Iowa Infantry Regiment) and they served from December 1862 through May 1865. The average age was 57 and there were over 100 men in their 60's. The secretary of war gave permission for them to enlist, but only serving in guard and garrison duty. They did guard duty in cities like St. Louis, Cincinnati, and Memphis. While guarding a train headed towards Mississippi, the infantry was ambushed, killing 2 in their infantry. Less than 10 were killed throughout the war.

=== African Americans ===
11 companies made up the 60th Colored Infantry. In December 1863, the infantry was stationed in Helena, Arkansas. They spent the next 15 months there, with more than 300 soldiers dying of disease. While on a reconnaissance mission, the infantry was ambushed by 1,500 southern troops. They retreated back to Helena and formed a block, causing the southern troops to withdraw from the area.

During the war, some enslaved African Americans fled to Iowa. Many white Iowans helped them hide and give them food. After the war, Iowa made it legal for black men to vote, 2 years before the 15th amendment was ratified.

The northern economy boomed during the war and many families in Iowa benefited from increasing grain and livestock prices. During this time Iowa gained 180,000 people, increasing farming production in the state with agricultural products such as corn, wheat, and hogs.

== Political arena of late 19th through early 20th century ==
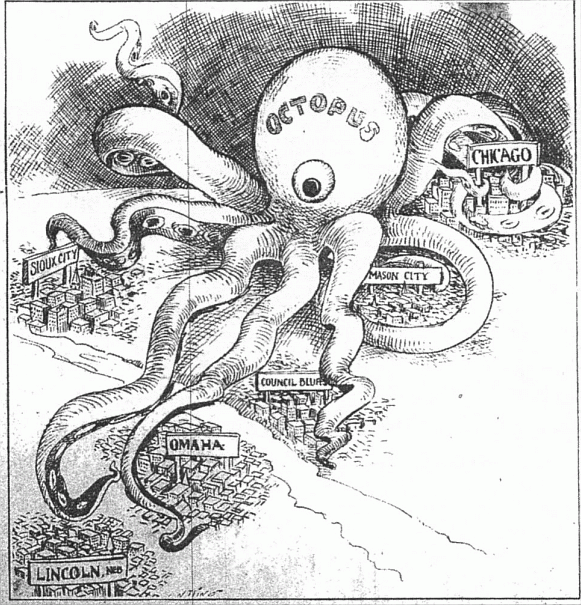
Progressives denounce AT&T the telephone monopoly as a grasping octopus taking control of entire cities in Iowa in 1917.

The Civil War era brought considerable change to Iowa and perhaps one of the most visible changes came in the political arena. During the 1840s, most Iowans voted Democratic although the state also contained some Whigs. Most democratic Iowans were European immigrants and southerners who moved to Iowa. During the 1850s, however, the state's Democratic Party developed serious internal problems as well as being unsuccessful in getting the national Democratic Party to respond to their needs. Iowans soon turned to the newly emerging Republican Party. The new party opposed slavery and promoted land ownership, banking, and railroads. In 1854, Iowans elected James Grimes governor on the Whig ticket. Two years later, Iowans elected Grimes governor on the Republican ticket. Grimes would later serve as a Republican United States Senator from Iowa. Republicans took over state politics in the 1850s and quickly instigated several changes. They moved the state capital from Iowa City to Des Moines, established the University of Iowa and they wrote a new state constitution. From the late 1850s until well into the 20th century, Iowans remained largely Republican. Only once, in 1889, did Democrats elect a governor, Horace Boies who was re-elected in 1891. Their secret was winning increased support from the "wet" (anti-prohibition) Germans. Historically, the Democrats were strongest in German areas, especially along the Mississippi River. Thus, the German Catholic city of Dubuque continues to be a Democratic stronghold. Meanwhile, the Yankees and Scandinavians (and Quakers) were overwhelmingly Republican. Several Republicans took leadership positions in Washington, particularly Senators William Boyd Allison, Jonathan P. Dolliver, and Albert Baird Cummins, as well as Speaker of the House David B. Henderson.

=== Progressive movement ===
The spirit of progressivism emerged in the 1890s, flourished in the 1900s, and decayed after 1917. Under the guidance of Governor (1902–1908) and Senator (1908–1926) Albert Baird Cummins the "Iowa Idea" played a major role in state and national progressivism. A leading Republican, Cummins fought to break up monopolies. His Iowa successes included establishing the direct primary to allow voters to select candidates instead of bosses; outlawing free railroad passes for politicians; imposing a two cents per mile railway maximum passenger fare; imposing pure food and drug laws; and abolishing corporate campaign contributions. He tried, without success, to lower the high protective tariff in Washington.

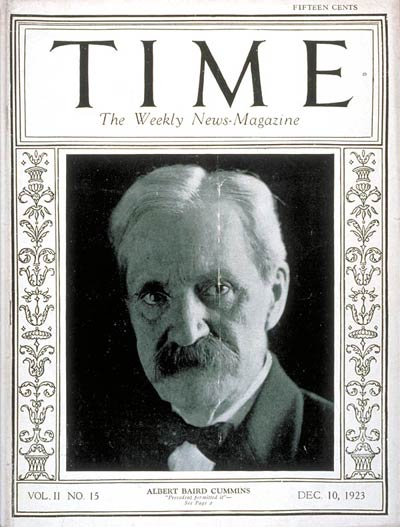
Senator Albert Baird Cummins on the Time cover, December 10, 1923

Women put women's suffrage on the state agenda. It was led by local chapters of the Woman's Christian Temperance Union, whose main goal was to impose prohibition. In keeping with the general reform mood of the latter 1860s and 1870s, the issue first received serious consideration when both houses of the General Assembly passed a women's suffrage amendment to the state constitution in 1870. Two years later, however, when the legislature had to consider the amendment again before it could be submitted to the general electorate. It was defeated because interest had waned, and strong opposition had developed especially in the German-American community, which feared women would impose prohibition. Finally, in 1920, Iowa got woman suffrage with the rest of the country by the 19th amendment to the federal Constitution.

== Early Immigration ==
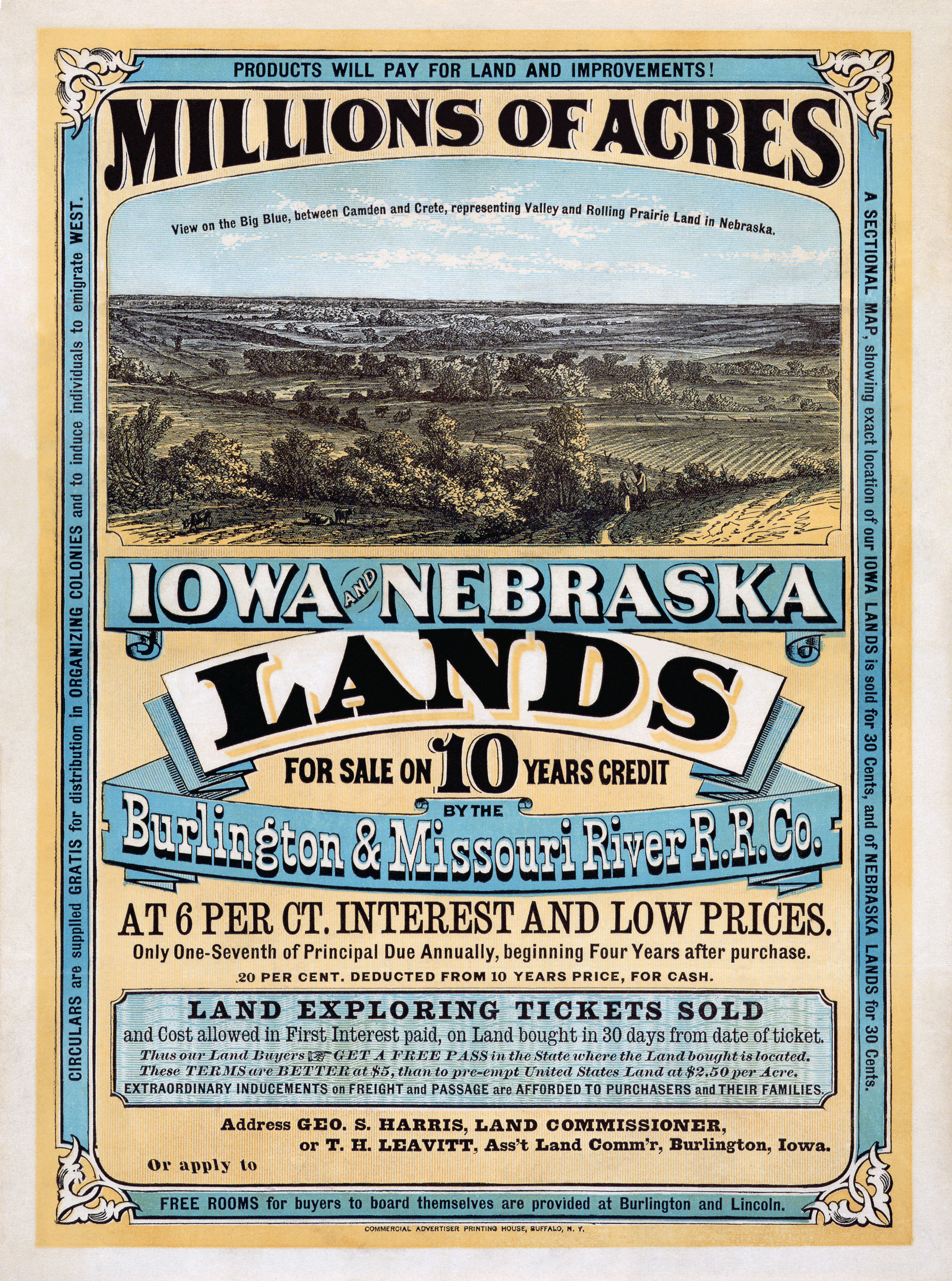
A land offer from the Burlington and Missouri River Railroad in 1872 offering land in Iowa and Nebraska

As the cession of Native American lands in Iowa continued, settlement by the United States pushed further westward. By 1838 there were 22,859 people in Iowa, and 42,112 by 1840. One interesting occasion illustrating the westward push occurred on April 30, 1843. Much of the land in central Iowa had been ceded from the Native Americans to the United States pursuant to the "New Purchase" in 1842. As the date at which settlement would be allowed approached, settlers gathered at the border to these new lands. On April 30, 1843, a cannon sounded at midnight, after which the settlers pushed into the new lands and settled many areas by sunrise. Most of the settlers who came into these "New Purchase" lands were from Illinois, Ohio, Indiana, Kentucky, and Missouri, and to a lesser extent Wisconsin, Virginia, and Pennsylvania. Notable during the 1840s was the arrival of the Norwegians in 1840, Swedes in 1845, and Dutch in 1847.

By 1850, there were 192,214 people living in Iowa. Nearly 90% of the population at this time was from America, with Ohio, Indiana, and Pennsylvania contributing the most settlers. Though immigration from other parts of the world had not yet hit full stride, there nonetheless existed 20,969 foreign immigrants in 1850. The largest group was the Germans with over 7,000, followed by the Irish with 4,885, England with 3,785, Canada with 1,756, the Netherlands with 1,108, 712 from Scotland, 361 from Norway, 231 from Sweden, and 19 from Denmark. Czechs also comprised a large settlement group. Settlement patterns to this point generally were in the southern and eastern parts of the state, often near the rivers. Immigration during this time was affected by many things, notably: the completion of railroads to the Mississippi, the advertising of Iowa lands by railroad and steamship companies, the publication of favorable guides and articles, drought in the Ohio Valley, and a cholera epidemic in other states. Other factors affecting immigration were frequently religious and political oppression in the immigrant's homeland, as well as economic problems in the homeland. While nativism was strong in other states, Iowa wanted immigrants and resisted the Know-Nothing Party.

Utopians came to Iowa in the 1850s to start the communistic colonies of Icaria, Amana, and New Buda, where property was held in common. Icaria was a French colony settled near Corning, Iowa, in 1858. The goal of the Icarian settlers was to live in accordance with the ideas of Etienne Cabet as a purely socialist community. Amana was a religious colony formed by German pietists in 1855 that practiced communism until 1932. It then became a center of modern manufacturing, especially of household appliances. New Buda was a proposed colony by a group of defeated Hungarian revolutionaries who arrived in Iowa in 1850, but was never built.

Immigration to Iowa continued to accelerate throughout the remainder of the 19th century, peaking in 1890. Immigration of foreign-born persons was no exception. In 1860, 106,081 of the 674,913 people living in Iowa were foreign-born persons. Most were German or Irish, though there were many from the rest of the United Kingdom, as well as Norway and Sweden. African-Americans also began immigrating to Iowa in more significant numbers through the 1860s, going from 1,069 inhabitants in 1860 to 5,762 in 1870.

The 1870s saw 204,692 foreign-born immigrants in Iowa, with 261,650 and 324,069 in 1880 and 1890, respectively. Competition among the states for immigrants was increasing during this time, leading Iowa to take certain measures to attract immigrants. The Iowa State Board of Immigration was created in 1870, and began printing promotional materials. One notable booklet was titled Iowa: The Home of Immigrants. The publication gave physical, social, educational, and political descriptions of Iowa. The legislature instructed that the booklet be published in English, German, Dutch, Swedish, and Danish.

The tide of foreign immigration receded, so that many groups had largely stopped coming by the beginning of the 20th century. Some, however, were just starting to immigrate. Southern and Eastern European immigration, especially from Italy and Croatia, began in not insignificant amounts in the late 19th and early 20th centuries as they came to work in Iowan coal mines. The early 20th century also saw the start of steady immigration from Mexico, and the mid-1970s saw immigration from Southeast Asia (especially the Tai Dam, Vietnamese, and Lao) as refugees from the Vietnam War searched for a peaceful place to live.

=== Immigration patterns ===
==== Dutch ====
The Dutch came to Iowa in 1847 while under the leadership of Reverend Hendrik (Henry) Pieter Scholte. There are several reasons for their immigration. Many did not like the new leadership of the Netherlands under William I. Economic conditions were poor in their homeland, worsened by a potato crop failure There was also a desire to obtain religious freedom, after having been treated poorly on account of religion in their home country. It is likely the latter motivation that led them to name their first Iowan colony Pella, in reference to a religious place of refuge. Once initially established, letters from early Dutch immigrants were published and circulated in the Netherlands, increasing subsequent immigration. Additional Dutch immigration continued to Pella, and in the following years a daughter colony was founded at Orange City.

==== Scandinavian ====
Scandinavian immigration to Iowa mostly consists of Norwegians and Swedes, though there was a small Danish immigration movement as well. Norwegians generally went to the northern parts of the state, Danes to the south, and Swedes in between. The immigration of Scandinavians to Iowa began in significant numbers in the 1850s and accelerated through the 1890s. Specifically, there were 611 in the state in 1850, 7814 in 1860, 31,177 in 1870, 46,046 in 1880, and 72,873 by 1890. Central causes for their immigration included the following: Economic problems in the homeland (crop failures, low wages, unemployment), dissatisfaction with church and state, letters from previous immigrants, and promotional material from states.

Swedish settlement in Iowa began with New Sweden in 1845 and Burlington in 1846. This was followed in the 1860s by settlement in the central portions of the state. The first colony, New Sweden, was led by Pehr Cassel. They had intended on going to one of the first U.S. Swedish settlements at Pine Lake, Wisconsin, but were convinced by Pehr Dahlberg in New York to travel to Iowa instead.

Norwegian immigration to Iowa began in 1840 with settlement at Sugar Creek in southeastern Iowa, and continued with immigration to northern Iowa in the late 1840s. The Sugar Creek colony in Lee County was the result of a failed Missouri colony, and has its origins in the second Norwegian colony in the United States, that of Fox River in La Salle County, Illinois. The northern Iowa settlements extended from Allamakee and Clayton counties to Winnebago county, and came largely from settlements at Rock County, Wisconsin, Dane County, Wisconsin, and Boone County, Illinois. From the late 1850s through the 1880s, Norwegians pushed to the western portions of the state. By the early 1890s, Norwegian immigration to Iowa had dropped off.

==== Czech ====
Most Czechs in Iowa settled in Cedar Rapids. During the 1850s, Iowa's Czech population became substantial. When the town was reincorporated in 1856, a quarter of its roughly 1,600 inhabitants were Czech immigrants. The availability of cheap land in the new state of Iowa happened to coincide with the Revolutions of 1848 in the Austrian Empire that caused a large number of Czechs to flee their homeland and emigrate to the U.S. Today, Cedar Rapids' Czech Village and the National Czech & Slovak Museum & Library celebrate the area's Czech heritage.

==== Latino ====
The first Latino group to immigrate to Iowa were Mexicans, who can be traced in small numbers to the 1850 census. Substantial Mexican immigration, however, did not begin until the early 1900s. In 1900 there were 29 Mexicans in Iowa, followed by 509 in 1910, and 2,560 in 1920. Puerto Ricans, Cubans, and others from Central and South America followed, though a significant majority of Iowa's Latino population was and remains Mexican.

The sharp increase in Mexican immigration in the early 20th century has several causes, mostly economic. Sugar consumption was on the rise nationally, and technological breakthroughs in the sugar beet industry allowed Midwestern farms to expand in attempt to meet that need. As they expanded, the need for labor increased. Sugar beet growing requires a significant amount of difficult manual labor, and immigration restrictions on Europeans during the time limited their availability to work in the United States. Additionally, Mexican labor was desired because of their strong work ethic and acceptance of lower wages. Consequently, Mexicans were recruited by the American Beet Sugar Company (American Crystal Sugar Company) from Mexico and the southwestern states to work in the north central part of the state, especially around Mason City. For many of the same reasons that Mexicans were recruited to work in the sugar beet industry, they were also recruited to work on the railroads in Iowa. Many of the Mexicans recruited to work on the railroads established communities at Fort Madison, Council Bluffs, Des Moines, and Davenport. Additionally, a significant revolution in Mexico in 1910 led more Mexicans to emigrate, and ultimately arrive in Iowa.

Mexican immigration dropped off during the great depression as the economy weakened, and remained relatively low even into the latter half of the 20th century. The late 1980s and subsequent periods have brought a resurgence of Mexican immigration as the demand for labor in the food processing industry has increased.

==== African-American ====
Though African-Americans began immigrating to Iowa in more significant numbers through the 1860s after obtaining freedom, some of the earliest immigrants would have been brought in as slaves by settlers from southern states after the Black Hawk Purchase, despite the fact that slavery never officially existed in Iowa. The absence of legally sanctioned slavery in Iowa did not mean that the state was free from discrimination, however. An 1838 Act prevented African-American settlement in Iowa unless they could present a "fair certificate" of "actual freedom" under the seal of a judge and give a $500 bond. Though this undoubtedly slowed African-American immigration, a few immigrants nonetheless came in the 1840s; most worked in the mines of Dubuque or in the river towns. Frequently, they came to be free of slavery. The third general assembly passed an act in 1851 similar to that of the 1839 act, but it appears to have rarely been enforced and was ultimately ruled in 1863 to be unconstitutional.

Initial African-American settlement in Iowa after the Civil War was in agricultural communities near the southern border, as well as along river towns on the Mississippi and to a lesser extent the Missouri. Polk County was also a destination for immigrants. Those along the river often worked on boats, though many worked on the railroads and in the lead mines of Dubuque.

Over time, African Americans migrated from agricultural communities to urban areas, and from the river towns to the coal mines of southern Iowa. This urban shift started around 1870, while the coal mining shift started in 1880. The coal mining shift began when African-Americans were brought from the southern states to the southern Iowa coal mines as strikebreakers, after which they remained employed there. This immigration was augmented by poor economic conditions in the southern states resulting from discrimination, flood and pest-induced crop failures, and disadvantaged post-reconstruction economic arrangements like sharecropping. The relatively significant African-American immigration to the southern Iowa coal fields led to largely African-American settlements such as Buxton.

The first World War brought more African-American immigrants to Iowa, as Fort Des Moines had been designated as "the only camp in the United States for the training of African American officers", followed by Camp Dodge near Des Moines. Many came to train in the service of their country, where some remained and brought family and friends from the southern states. This pattern was repeated in World War II, as Fort Des Moines again trained many African Americans.

== 1917–1945 ==
=== World War I ===
In 1917, the United States entered World War I and Iowa provided almost 115,000 men for service. Farmers as well as all Iowans experienced a wartime economy. For farmers, the change was significant. Since the beginning of the war in 1914, Iowa farmers had experienced economic prosperity. Along with farmers everywhere, they were urged to be patriotic by increasing their production. Farmers purchased more land and raised more corn, beef, and pork for the war effort. Farmers expanded their operations, made more money, and at the same time, helped the Allied war effort.

=== Great Depression ===
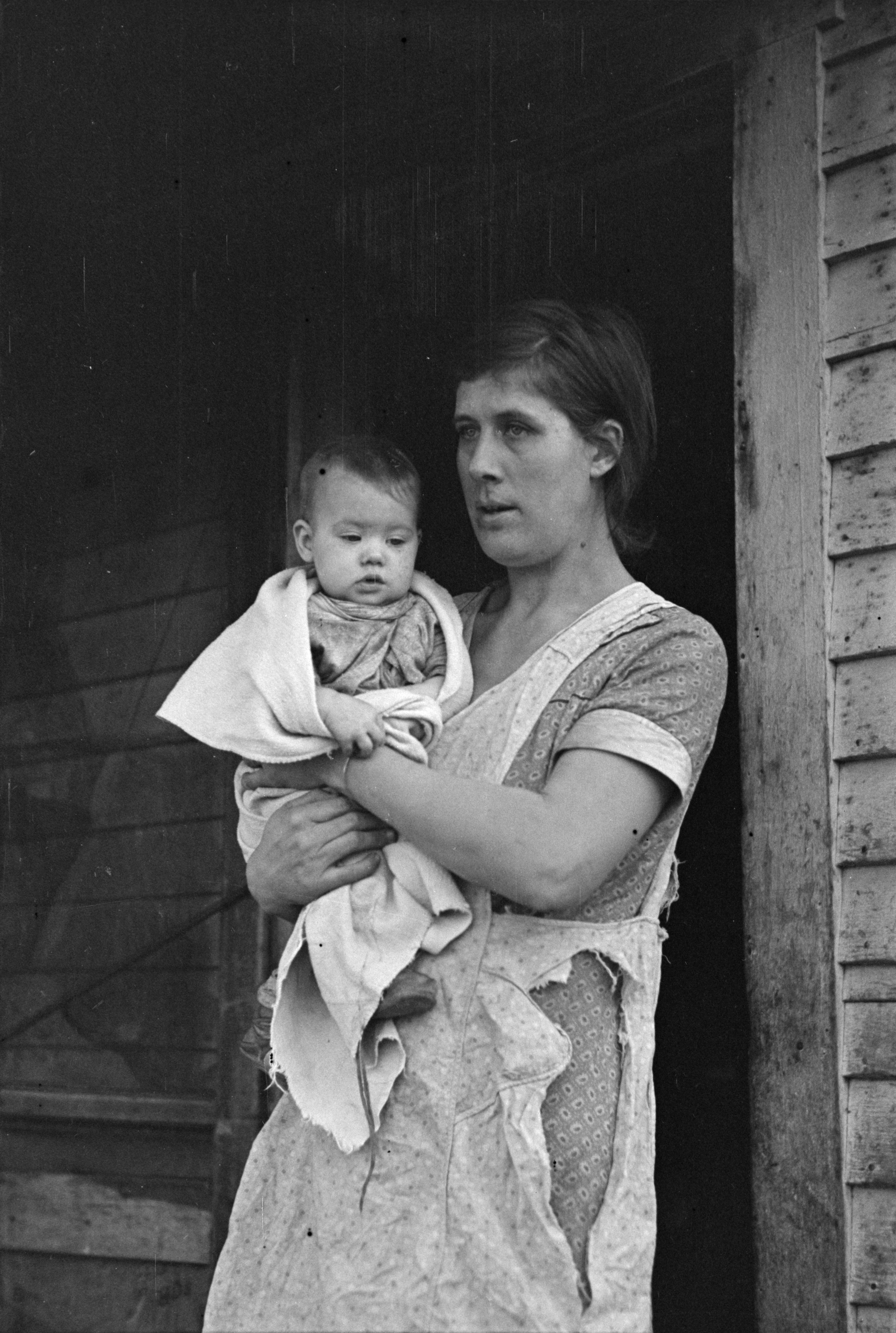
A woman living near Shannon City during the Great Depression.

After the war, however, Iowa farmers soon saw wartime farm subsidies eliminated. Beginning in 1920, many farmers had difficulty making the payment for debts they had incurred during the war. The 1920s were a time of hardship for Iowa's farm families, and for many families, these hardships carried over into the 1930s. Herbert Hoover, who was the only president from Iowa, failed to deal with the causes of the Great Depression, and Iowa was hit just as hard as any other state.

As economic difficulties worsened, Iowa farmers sought to find local solutions. Faced with extremely low farm prices, including corn at ten cents a bushel and pork at three cents a pound, some farmers in western Iowa formed the Farmers Holiday Association. This group, which had its greatest strength in the area around Sioux City, tried to withhold farm products from markets. They believed this practice would force up farm prices. The Farm Holiday Association had only limited success as many farmers did not cooperate and the withholding itself did little to raise prices. Farmers experienced little relief until 1933 when the federal government, as part of Franklin D. Roosevelt's New Deal, created a federal farm aid program.

In 1933, native Iowan Henry A. Wallace went to Washington as Secretary of Agriculture and served as principal architect for the new farm program. Wallace, former editor of the Midwest's leading farm journal, Wallace's Farmer, believed that prosperity would return to the agricultural sector only if agricultural production was curtailed. Further, he believed that farmers would be monetarily compensated for withholding agricultural land from production. These two principles were incorporated into the Agricultural Adjustment Act passed in 1933. Iowa farmers experienced some recovery as a result of the legislation but like all Iowans, they did not experience total recovery until the 1940s. Iowa's only Nobel Peace Prize Winner, Norman Borlaug, was launched in his researches in plant genomics by funding and research through Iowa State University developing strains of rice in Mexico and which emanated from the work of Henry Wallace. Wallace and Borlaug's work helped create the now internationally significant agricultural concern Pioneer Hi-Bred, now a division of DuPont.

== 1945 to present ==
=== World War II ===
Iowa was running out of farmers and laborers due to workers getting drafted or enlisting in the war. The government stopped drafting as many farmers so that they could stay home and work on farming instead. 200,000 men received "Certificates for War Service" so they wouldn't get any derogatory remarks about not enlisting. Many companies advertised the idea of farmers staying home to help the economy instead of enlisting. Some companies advertised towards women and how they should buy products for their husbands to stay awake while working. Due to men serving in the war, a lot of women had to work and take care of children during the war. They were encouraged to take care of farms and was seen as more fashionable to do than before the war. After the war, men came back to farming while women took care of the house. Many women lost their jobs, causing them to get hired in a poorly paid women sector of the job market.

=== Effects of World War II ===
Since World War II, Iowans have continued to undergo considerable economic, political, and social change. In the political area, Iowans experienced a major change in the 1960s when liquor by the drink came into effect. During both the nineteenth and early twentieth centuries, Iowans had strongly supported prohibition, but, in 1933, with the repeal of national prohibition, Iowans established a state liquor commission. This group was charged with control and regulation of Iowa's liquor sales. From 1933 until the early 1960s, Iowans could purchase packaged liquor only. In the 1970s, Iowans witnessed a reapportionment of the General Assembly, achieved only after a long struggle for an equitably apportioned state legislature. Another major political change was in regard to voting. By the mid-1950s, Iowa had developed a fairly competitive two-party structure, ending almost one hundred years of Republican domination within the state.

In the economic sector, Iowa also has undergone considerable change. Beginning with the first farm-related industries developed in the 1870s, Iowa has experienced a gradual increase in the number of business and manufacturing operations. The period since World War II has witnessed a particular increase in manufacturing operations. While agriculture continues to be the state's dominant industry, Iowans also produce a wide variety of products including refrigerators, washing machines, fountain pens, farm implements, and food products that are shipped around the world.

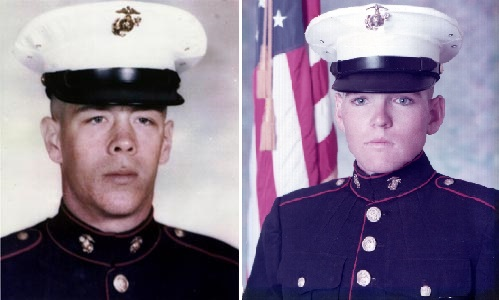
Charles McMahon and Darwin Judge, the last 2 American soldiers killed in Vietnam during the Vietnam War

=== Vietnam War ===
During the Vietnam War, Iowa let in more than 10,000 immigrants from Vietnam to live in Des Moines. One of the most prominent groups was the Tai Dam, with around 1,300 moving to Iowa. Many worked in meatpacking plants, but some started their own businesses. 115,000 Iowans served in the Vietnam War, and 869 of them were killed. On April 29, 1975, Charles McMahon and Darwin Judge were the last two American casualties of the Vietnam War. They were killed during a mortar attack in Saigon. Judge was born in Marshalltown and his body was returned in March 1976. He later earned a Purple Heart in 2000.

=== Iowa Caucuses ===
Since 1972, Iowa has started the presidential primary process by holding the first caucuses. In the late 1960s and early 1970s, Democrats in Iowa were frustrated with the state's caucus system, which they felt was run by party bosses. Changes to address this problem involved holding separate district and state conventions, which meant that the whole caucus process needed to start earlier. When Jimmy Carter won the 1976 Democratic caucus in Iowa, the national attention he received ultimately helped him to win the presidency. This also solidified the importance of the Iowa caucuses. Only two other presidents since 1976 have won the Iowa caucuses: Barack Obama in 2008 and George W. Bush in 2000. Other presidents have gone on to win despite losing the caucuses such as Ronald Reagan in 1980, George H.W. Bush in 1988, Donald Trump in 2016, and Joe Biden in 2020.

=== Farm Crisis ===
During the farm crisis, catalysed by policies introduced by President Ronald Reagan in the early 1980s, the price of farmland plummeted by more than half and the rest of the local economy was proportionally effected. Businesses outside of rural areas were badly hurt by the depression. Large corporations, such as John Deer, laid off thousands of employees. Around 256 of Iowa's farm implement dealers went out of business. Between 1979 and 1986, Iowa lost 84,000 middle class jobs. Iowa also lost 59,000 manufacturing jobs and 24,000 construction jobs.

=== NAFTA ===
In the 1990s, the economy of Iowa was heavily impacted by NAFTA. It was introduced by the Republican congressional majority led by Newt Gingrich and signed into law by President Bill Clinton. Depression wages also affected Iowa by the result of the spike of undocumented immigration resulting from that policy. Displaced Mexican farmers flooded the state's remaining industry, meatpacking. Companies like Cargill and Swift solicited workers from cities in Mexico to come to Iowa for work by posting billboards south of the border when Mexican farmers were being wiped out by the sudden drop in staple prices that came in the wake of NAFTA's passage. People from other Latin American countries, Laos, and Ethiopia were also being brought to these facilities. More than one-third of the workers suffered a serious injury every year. The immigration affected many towns in Iowa. Storm Lake saw tons of immigrants come to work in meatpacking plants. By 2021, it became the most diverse city in Iowa and 85% of the students in school were not white.

Though crystal meth first began to become popular in the United States on the west coast, the first majorly scaled meth superlabs in the American midwest sprouted up in Iowa—the operation run by Lori Arnold is an exemplar of this trend. Shortly after Arnold was imprisoned in 1991, both the methods of manufacturing and distribution of the drug evolved. Social impacts resulting from NAFTA (such as job loss and depressed wages) are correlated with accelerated diffusion and prevalence of the drug before during the period of the first meth epidemic.

Real average earnings per job relative to the rest of the United States fell in Iowa, for most of the period between 1969 and 2022—reaching their lowest point in the 1990s and 2000s. Growth during this period improved somewhat over the last decade, but remains flat relative to 1969, reflecting zero growth, when parity with the rest of the United States is considered, over the past half-century.

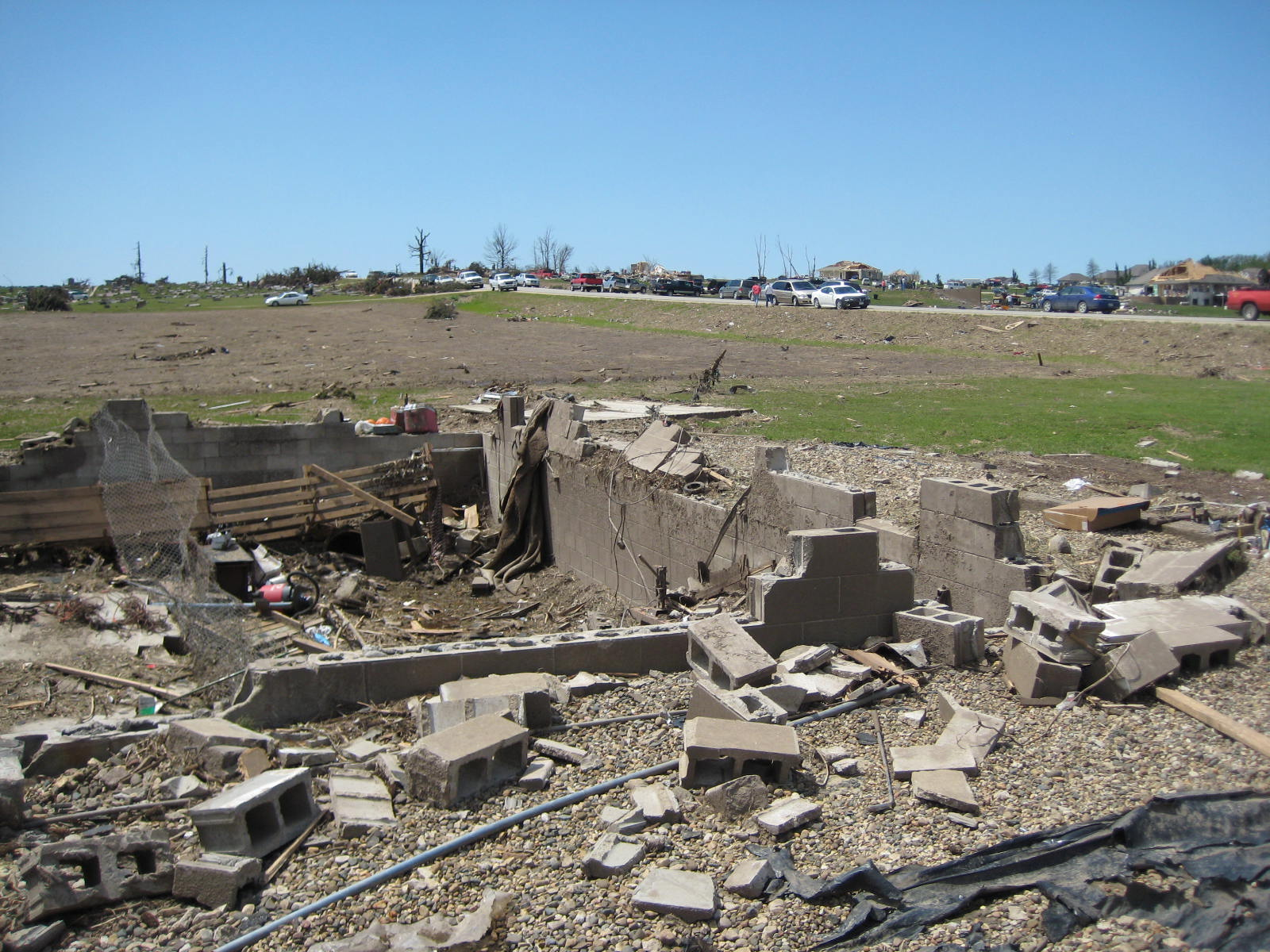
A house completely swept off its foundation in Parkersburg after the 2008 Parkersburg-New Hartford tornado.

=== Natural disasters ===
Iowa has experienced 52 presidentially declared disasters from 1990 to 2025. Some of the worst include Apr 13, 1993 - Oct 1, 1993, which saw the Great Flood of 1993 that resulted in 17 fatalities and more than $2 billion in damage in Iowa. Over 10,000 people were evacuated from their homes, and 21,000 homes were damaged. May 25, 2008 - Aug 13, 2008, saw the 2008 Iowa floods and the Parkersburg tornado. These two events caused $8–10 billion in damage, and more than 40,000 people affected. August 10, 2020 saw the 2020 Midwest derecho which was the costliest wind storm in the United States. In Iowa, 3 people were killed, and damages reached $7.5 billion with the majority of the damage being in the Cedar Rapids area.

=== COVID-19 ===
The first confirmed COVID-19 cases in Iowa were announced on March 8, 2020, when three individuals who had traveled on a cruise in Egypt caught the virus before returning home to Johnson County on March 3. In May 2021 Governor Kim Reynolds signed into law a ban on school districts and local and county governments from requiring masks worn on public property if the individual is fully vaccinated. This law took effect on May 20, 2021. A total of 10,797 people have died by COVID-19 with almost 1,000,000 cases being reported.

== See also ==
- State Historical Society of Iowa
- Iowa Historic Preservation Alliance
- List of historical societies in Iowa
- History of the Midwestern United States
- Timeline of Des Moines, Iowa
- Women's suffrage in Iowa
- Native American tribes in Iowa
