= Old Thresher's Reunion =

Annual event in Iowa, United States

Coordinates: 40°57′19.47″N 91°32′52.22″W

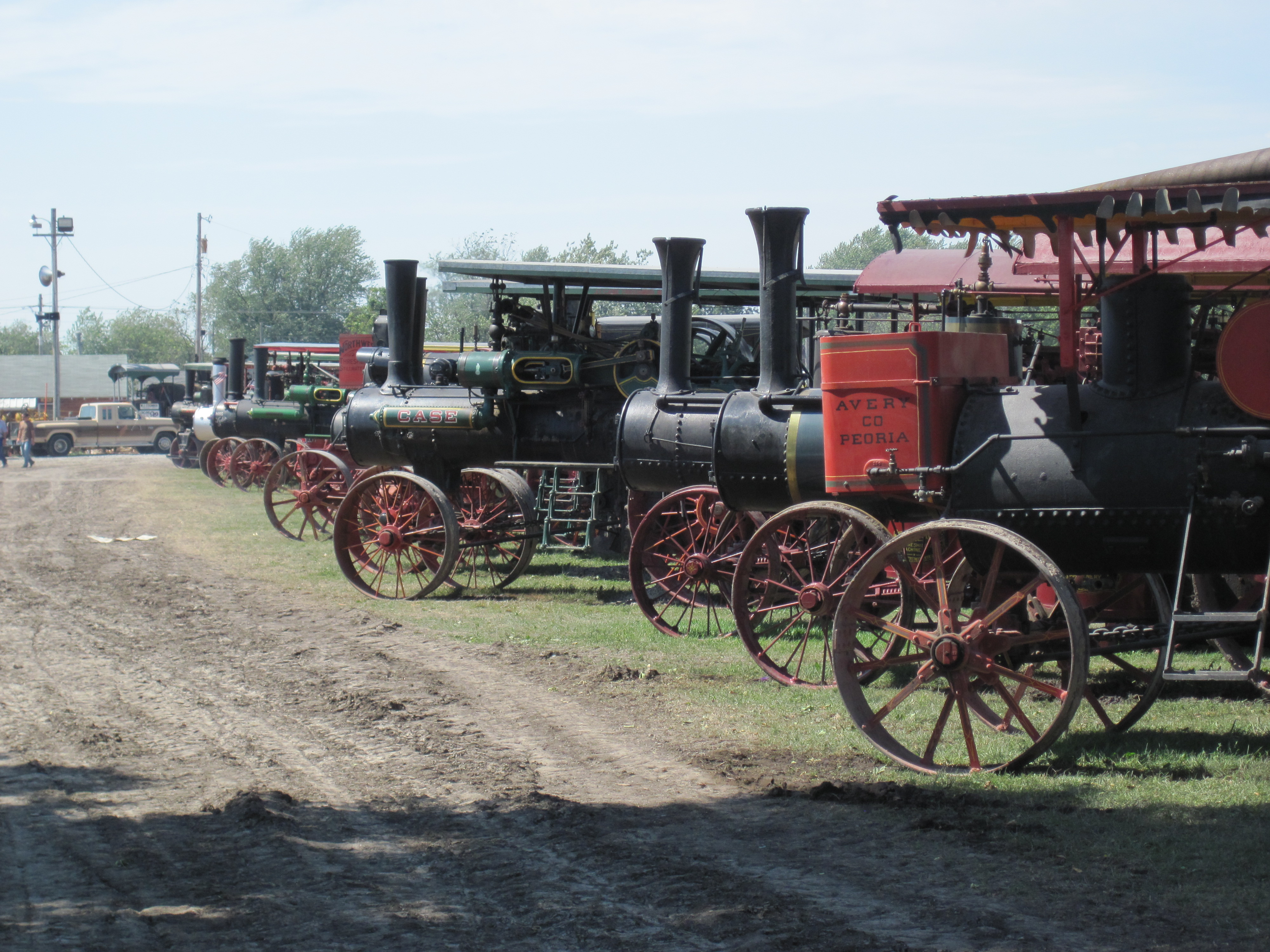
Steam tractor lineup at the 2010 Reunion

The Midwest Old Threshers Reunion is an annual event that takes place in Mt. Pleasant, Iowa, United States, and runs for five days, ending on the Labor Day weekend. It was first held in 1950, and has taken place every year except 2020, when it was cancelled due to the COVID-19 pandemic. When it first started, it focused on steam engines and antique agricultural equipment, but has developed into an entertainment event with a wider remit. The city of less than 10,000 inhabitants receives thousands of visitors from around the world.

Old Threshers Reunion, as an event, attracts visitors from around the world, attracted by both the permanent exhibits on the reunion grounds and by the collections of antique and steam powered equipment brought to the show by other visitors.

== Permanent exhibits ==
The Heritage Museum is open year-round, featuring a variety of exhibits that celebrate the rural heritage of the Midwest.

The Stationary steam engine exhibit features three large Corliss engines as well as a number of smaller engines.

The Midwest Electric Railway operates a 4 ft 8 1/2 in (1,435 mm) standard gauge trolley line around the reunion campground. A number of well restored Iowa trolleys operate on this line, including Waterloo Car 381, the last trolley to operate in public service in Iowa and Car 9 from the Albia Interurban Line. MERA also operates Car 320, which is a wooden interurban from the Chicago Aurora and Elgin line in Illinois. Additional favorite cars come from as far away as Rio de Janeiro, Brazil and Milan, Italy.

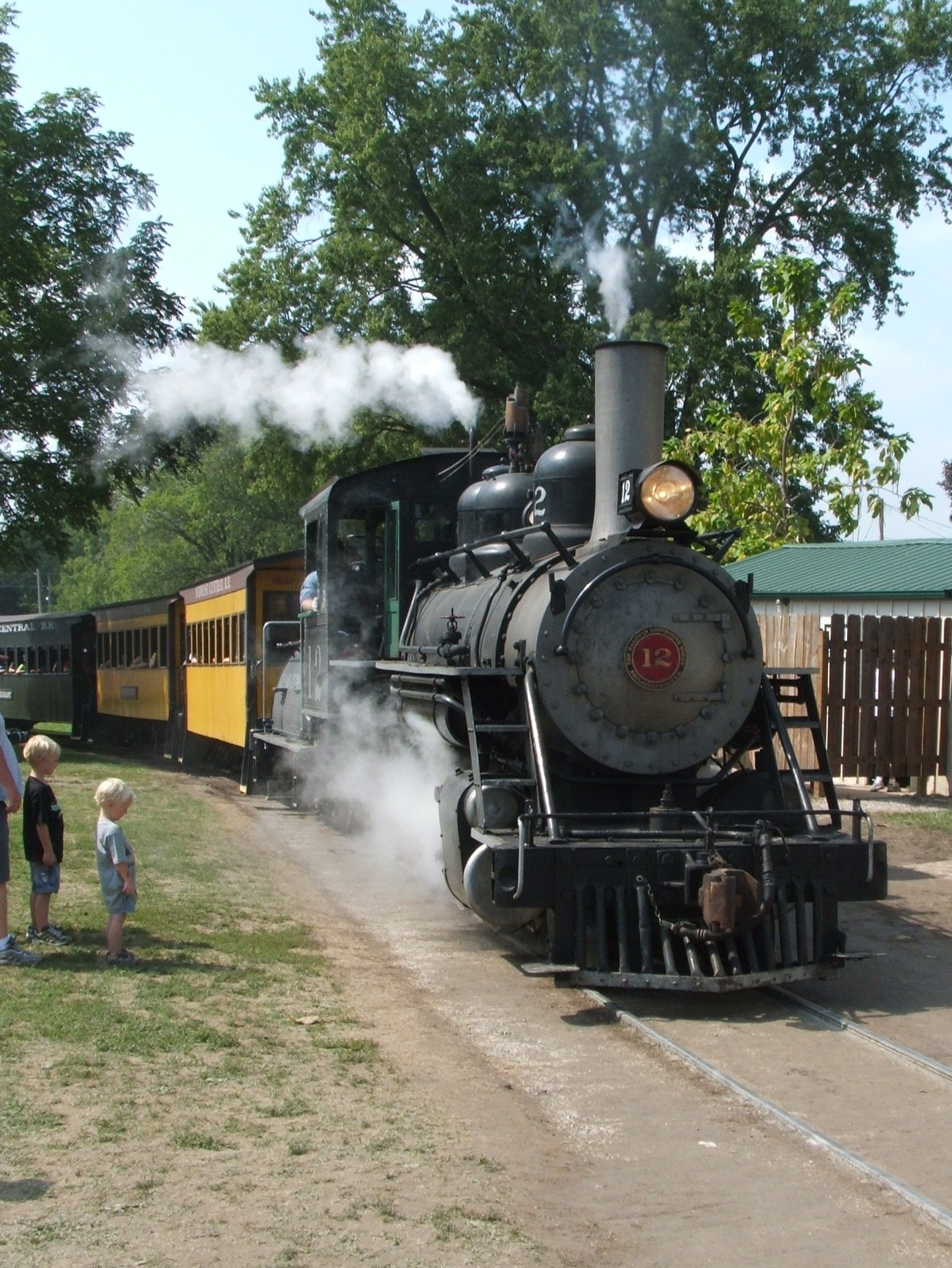
Midwest Central train pulling into Snipe Runn station.

The Midwest Central Railroad operates a 3 ft (914 mm) narrow gauge railway around the reunion exhibit area. This railroad features a Class C Shay locomotive from the West Side Lumber Company railway. Other engines include two 2-6-0 Baldwin engines (one having a recently updated boiler and the other undergoing extensive rework) that formerly served logging railroads in the eastern United States and a German 0-4-0 built by Henschel & Son. For routine operations, there are two Plymouth Locomotive Works diesel switch engines, and a Vulcan Iron Works gasoline switch engine. In addition to operating during the reunion, the Midwest Central Railroad has public events connected to Independence Day, Halloween and Christmas.

The Hazel Grace Pierson Carousel Pavilion houses a beautiful fully restored antique carousel. "The Smile Machine" is powered by a Herschell-Spillman steam engine that dates back over a century. The carousel includes a Military Band Organ, as well as the usual rocking horses.

== Reunion venues ==
During the show, the village and train station at Snipe Run on the north side of the reunion grounds is an active place, as is the log village at the south end of the trolley line. Major exhibit areas are reserved for different antique engines, including small steam engines, steam traction engines, and gas engines. Other major exhibits include antique cars and trucks, applications and uses of antique engines, masonry, textile and handmade arts, and food stands. At noon every day of the reunion, there is a parade of power, where all the operating steam and gas traction engines parade by the grandstand.

A 1916 Rauch and Lang Electric Automobile on display

There are two main events every night of the reunion week. In the early evening, the Schaffner Players perform an old "Toby and Susie" Toby Tolliver play in the Theatre Museum, after which there is a concert in the pavilion. The Reunion has succeeded in attracting acts including Minnie Pearl, Leroy Van Dyke, Tammy Wynette, George Strait, Johnny Cash & June Carter, Kenny Rogers, Brad Paisley, Terri Clark, Willie Nelson, LeAnn Rimes, and Dylan Scott who have all performed on the pavilion stage.

== Map of the grounds ==
- "The official map". Archived from the original on February 11, 2012.
- An alternative map
