= James W. Cownie Soccer Park =

Park in Des Moines, Iowa

- Type: Soccer park
- Location: Des Moines, Iowa
- Coordinates: 41°33′45.8634″N 93°34′00.2526″W
- Area: 372.8 acres (150.9 ha)
- Owned by: City of Des Moines

James W. Cownie Soccer Park is a soccer park located in Des Moines, Iowa. The park has 372.8 acres and is surrounded by Des Moines to the East and South, and by the Des Moines River to the North and West. The park is owned and operated by the Des Moines Parks and Recreation. Drake University, Grandview University, and multiple schools and leagues use the park for soccer use.

== History ==
The park was built in 1998 due to a demand for sports in the area. In 2003, the Drake soccer team relocated to the park, and the Des Moines Parks and Recreation built a 1,000-seat bleacher addition, a press box, and a score board for it. There has been numerous national and regional competitions including the 2006 USYSA National Championships, and the 2007 Regional II Soccer Championship. In 2009, the first-ever men's NCAA Tournament game took place.

In 2019, the park talked about expanding the area another 87 acres south of existing fields, wanting to create 12 more fields and in turn would generate $1.47 billion of income for the park. It would also include plans of additional parking, restrooms, a concessions area and a team building. Another proposal of $1.2 million in improvements to the existing soccer park were also mentioned, including the addition of 80 parking spots and two more restroom and concessions buildings. Cownie Soccer Park operates at an annual deficit of $262,700. The park could gain a net income of $51,700 if approved.
