= CR8 =

CR8 may refer to:

- CR8, a postcode district in the CR postcode area
- Plymouth CR-8 locomotives
- CSV CR8, car
- CR8, Control register number 8: enables x86 processors to prioritize external interrupts and is referred to as the task-priority register
- Hougang MRT station, Singapore, MRT station code
