= Mount Pleasant, Iowa =

- City
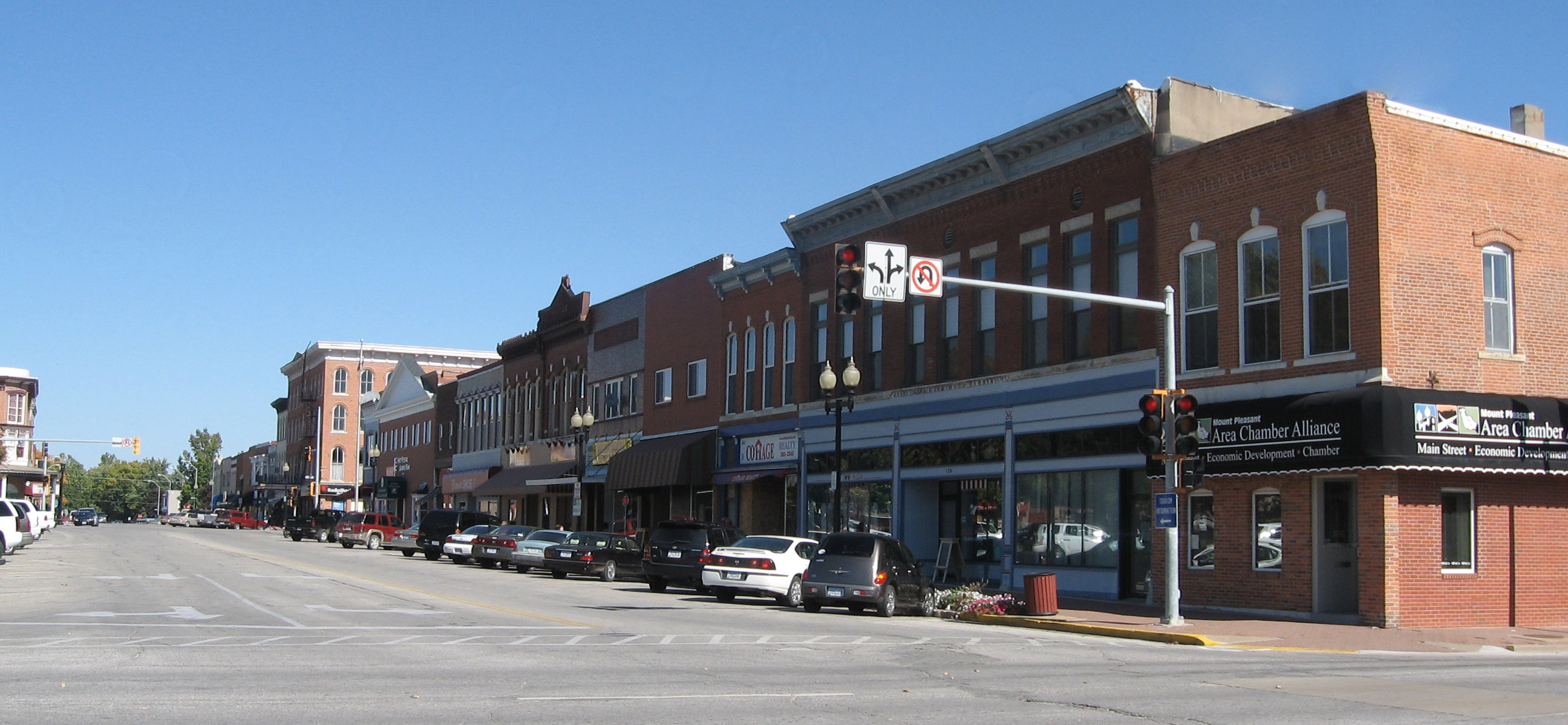
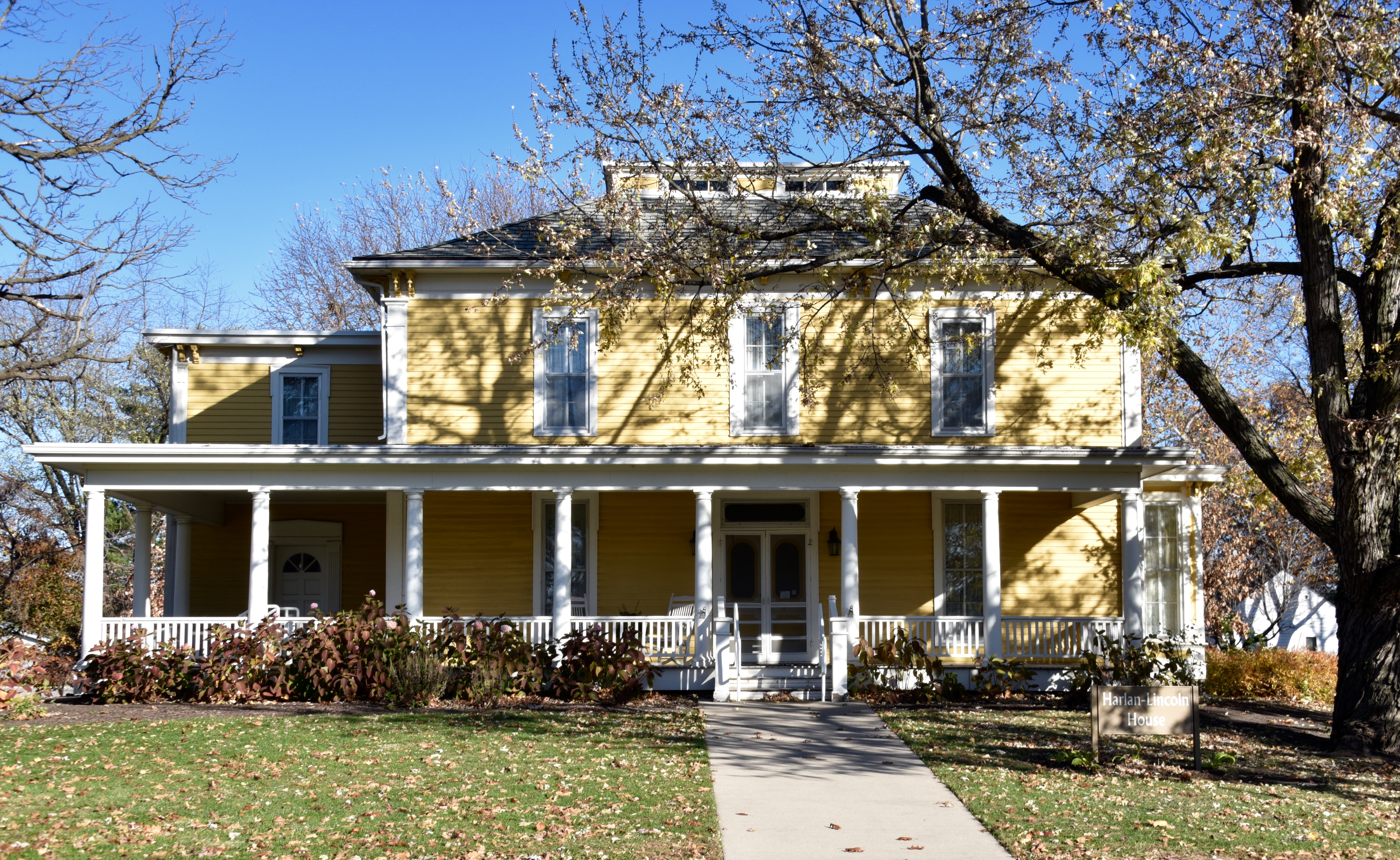
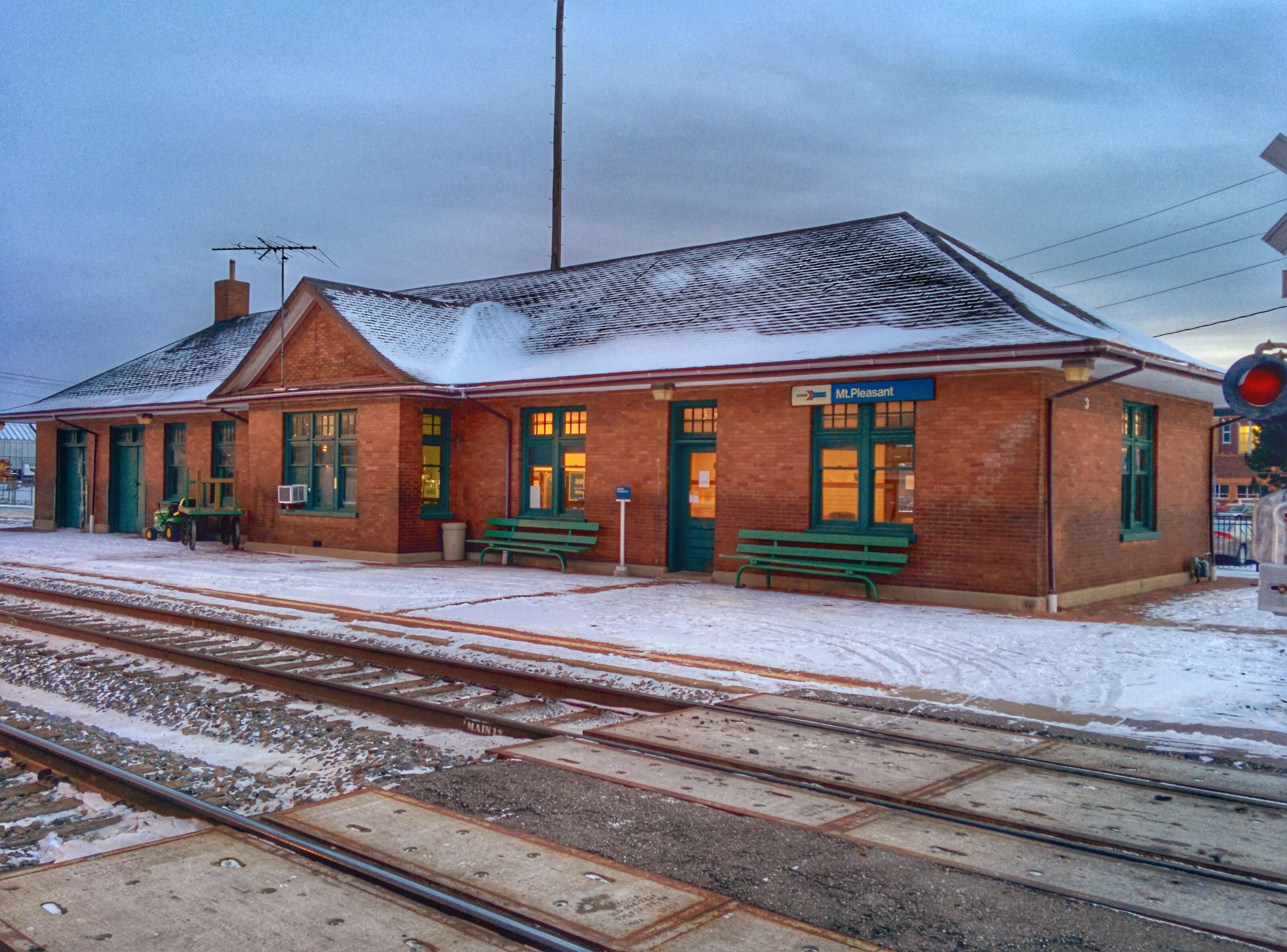
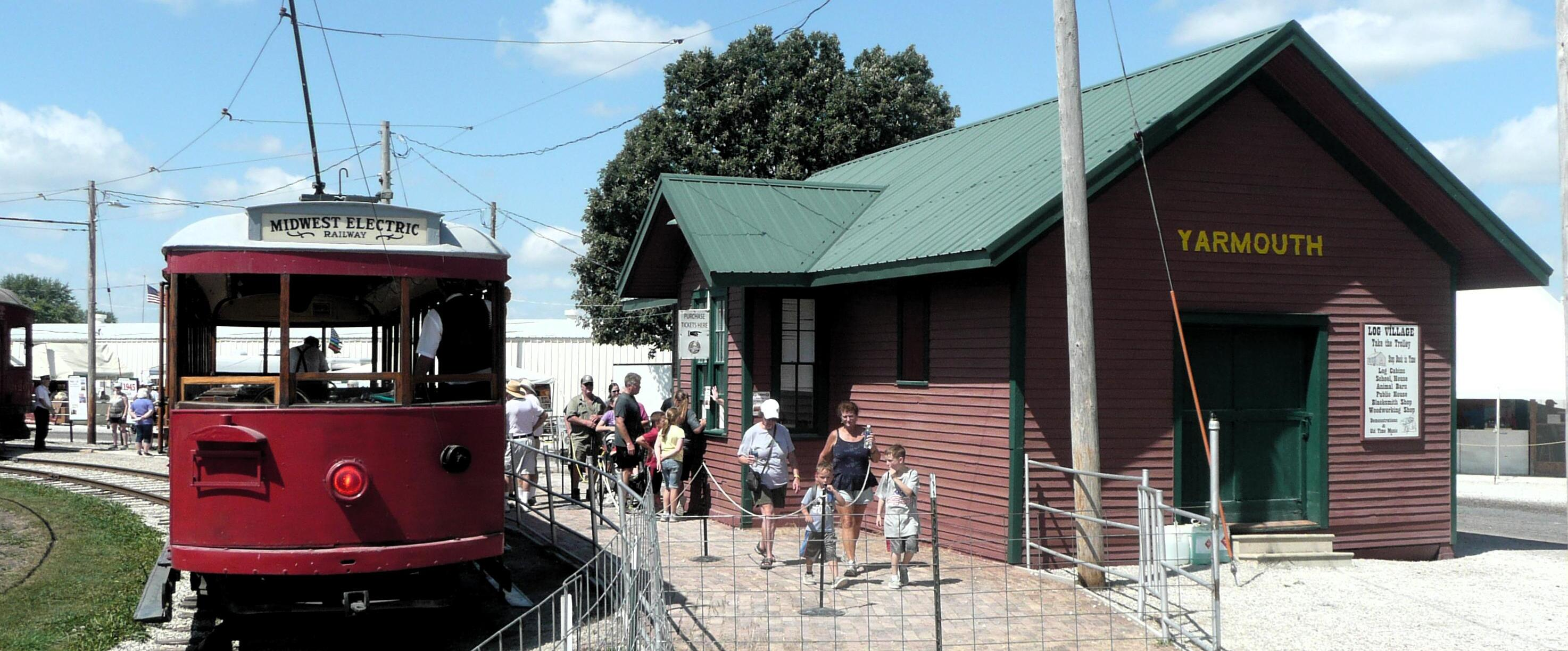
- Downtown Mount Pleasant Harlan-Lincoln House Mt. Pleasant Amtrak Station Midwest Electric Railway trolley on the grounds of the Old Thresher's Reunion
- Motto: Pursuing excellence
- Location of Mount Pleasant, Iowa
- Coordinates: 40°57′45″N 91°32′42″W
- Country: United States
- State: Iowa
- County: Henry
- Incorporated: July 15, 1856

Government
  - Mayor: Steve Brimhall

Area
  - Total: 8.64 sq mi (22.39 km^{2})
  - Land: 8.63 sq mi (22.35 km^{2})
  - Water: 0.015 sq mi (0.04 km^{2})
- Elevation: 728 ft (222 m)

Population (2020)
  - Total: 9,274
  - Density: 1,070/sq mi (415/km^{2})
- Time zone: UTC-6 (Central (CST))
  - Summer (DST): UTC-5 (CDT)
- ZIP code: 52641
- Area code: 319
- FIPS code: 19-54705
- GNIS feature ID: 468416
- Website: cityofmountpleasantiowa.org

Mount Pleasant is a city in and the county seat of Henry County in the U.S. state of Iowa. The population was 9,274 in the 2020 census, an increase from 8,668 in the 2010 census. It was founded in 1835 by pioneer Presley Saunders.

== History ==
Historic Union Block building (2015)

The first permanent settlement at Mount Pleasant was made in 1833. Mount Pleasant was incorporated as a town in 1842, and again in 1851.

In 1869, Mount Pleasant was the site of a solar eclipse expedition, under the command of James Craig Watson and sponsored by National Almanac. The total solar eclipse occurred on August 7, 1869.

In the Union Block building in 1869, Arabella A. Mansfield became the first woman in the United States to be awarded a license to practice law. She had passed the bar exam with high scores and won a court case for entry to the bar. The legislature changed its statute.

The third floor of the Union Block housed the Opera House or Union Hall, a gathering place for the community. It attracted national speakers on tour, including abolitionists Frederick Douglass, Sojourner Truth, and Anna Dickinson. James Harlan also spoke there, as he was president of Iowa Wesleyan College in the town, and later was elected several times to the United States Senate. This building had been considered one of the most endangered historic sites in Iowa.

The Mount Pleasant Mental Health Institute was built in 1861. However, in 1936, a fire did great damage to the original building. Beginning in 1976, many of the hospital facilities were transferred to the Mount Pleasant Correctional Facility, which still occupies the campus. The hospital itself was closed in 2015.

On December 10, 1986, Ralph Orin Davis, a resident, walked into a city council meeting and shot Mayor Edward King and two council members. Mayor King died of his wounds after being shot point blank in the head. The 69-year-old gunman had attended a couple of previous meetings, complaining about a backed-up sewer and wanting the city to pay for damages to his house. The two council members were seriously wounded. Tom Vilsack became the replacement mayor, later serving as Governor of Iowa for 8 years, and then Secretary of Agriculture under the Obama and Biden administrations.

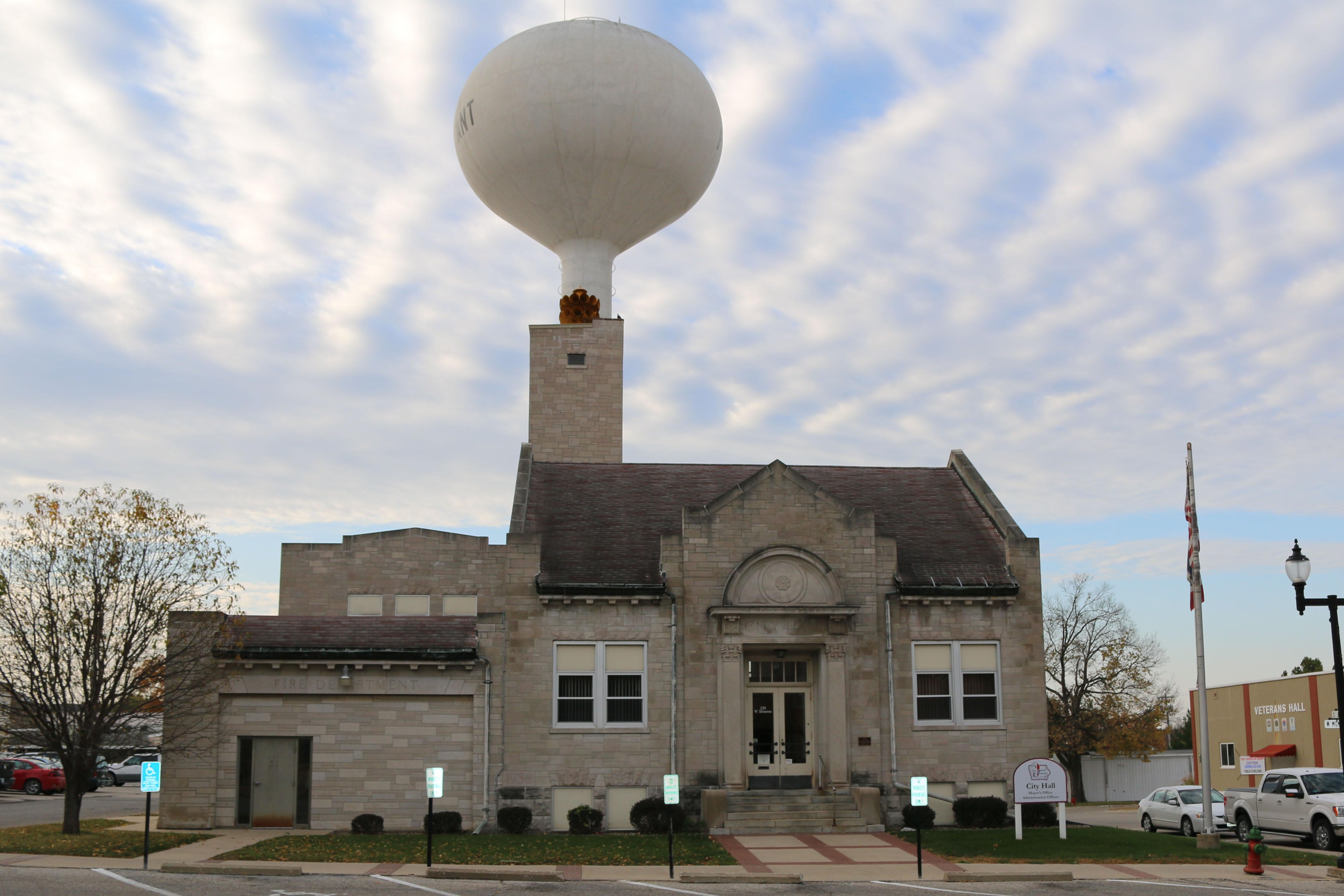
Mount Pleasant City Hall

== Geography ==
Mount Pleasant is in central Henry County at the intersection of US Routes 218 and 34.

According to the United States Census Bureau, the city has a total area of 8.53 square miles (22.09 km^{2}), of which, 8.51 square miles (22.04 km^{2}) is land and 0.02 square miles (0.05 km^{2}) is water.

Mount Pleasant's population density is estimated at 1,123 people per square mile, which is considered low for urban areas.

== Demographics ==
Historical population
Census	Pop.	Note	%±
1850	758		—
1860	3,530		365.7%
1870	4,245		20.3%
1880	4,410		3.9%
1890	3,997		−9.4%
1900	4,109		2.8%
1910	3,874		−5.7%
1920	3,987		2.9%
1930	3,743		−6.1%
1940	4,610		23.2%
1950	5,843		26.7%
1960	7,339		25.6%
1970	7,007		−4.5%
1980	7,322		4.5%
1990	8,027		9.6%
2000	8,751		9.0%
2010	8,668		−0.9%
2020	9,274		7.0%
U.S. Decennial Census

=== 2020 census ===
As of the 2020 census, Mount Pleasant had a population of 9,274, including 3,218 households and 1,926 families. The median age was 36.8 years, and 18.8% of residents were under the age of 18. For every 100 females there were 118.5 males, and for every 100 females age 18 and over there were 121.8 males age 18 and over.

The population density was 1,074.8 inhabitants per square mile (415.0/km^{2}). There were 3,501 housing units at an average density of 405.8 per square mile (156.7/km^{2}). Of the housing units, 8.1% were vacant; the homeowner vacancy rate was 1.9% and the rental vacancy rate was 6.7%.

98.8% of residents lived in urban areas, while 1.2% lived in rural areas.

Among households in the city, 27.1% had children under the age of 18 living with them, 42.8% were married-couple households, 6.9% were cohabitating-couple households, 30.6% were households with a female householder and no spouse or partner present, and 19.7% were households with a male householder and no spouse or partner present. Non-family households made up 40.1% of all households. About 34.9% of all households were made up of individuals, and 16.4% had someone living alone who was 65 years of age or older.

The age distribution was 22.7% under the age of 20, 10.2% from age 20 to 24, 26.7% from age 25 to 44, 22.7% from age 45 to 64, and 17.7% age 65 or older. The gender makeup of the city was 54.2% male and 45.8% female.

Racial composition as of the 2020 census
Race	Number	Percent
White	7,487	80.7%
Black or African American	457	4.9%
American Indian and Alaska Native	45	0.5%
Asian	387	4.2%
Native Hawaiian and Other Pacific Islander	4	0.0%
Some other race	354	3.8%
Two or more races	540	5.8%
Hispanic or Latino (of any race)	808	8.7%

=== 2010 census ===
As of the census of 2010, there were 8,668 people, 3,127 households, and 1,935 families living in the city. The population density was 1,018.6 inhabitants per square mile (393.3/km^{2}). There were 3,365 housing units at an average density of 395.4 per square mile (152.7/km^{2}). The racial makeup of the city was 85.7% White, 4.3% African American, 0.4% Native American, 4.4% Asian, 0.3% Pacific Islander, 2.4% from other races, and 2.5% from two or more races. Hispanic or Latino of any race were 6.7% of the population.

There were 3,127 households, of which 30.5% had children under the age of 18 living with them, 46.1% were married couples living together, 10.8% had a female householder with no husband present, 4.9% had a male householder with no wife present, and 38.1% were non-families. 33.3% of all households were made up of individuals, and 15% had someone living alone who was 65 years of age or older. The average household size was 2.31 and the average family size was 2.94.

The median age in the city was 37.3 years. 21.1% of residents were under the age of 18; 12.3% were between the ages of 18 and 24; 26.5% were from 25 to 44; 24.8% were from 45 to 64; and 15.3% were 65 years of age or older. The gender makeup of the city was 52.7% male and 47.3% female.

=== 2000 census ===
As of the census of 2000, there were 8,751 people, 3,119 households, and 1,940 families living in the city. The population density was 1,137.3 inhabitants per square mile (439.1/km^{2}). There were 3,355 housing units at an average density of 436.0 per square mile (168.3/km^{2}). The racial makeup of the city was 90.46% White, 3.19% African American, 0.32% Native American, 3.53% Asian, 0.06% Pacific Islander, 0.73% from other races, and 1.71% from two or more races. Hispanic or Latino of any race were 1.79% of the population.

There were 3,119 households, out of which 31.4% had children under the age of 18 living with them, 49.3% were married couples living together, 9.9% had a female householder with no husband present, and 37.8% were non-families. 33.2% of all households were made up of individuals, and 14.3% had someone living alone who was 65 years of age or older. The average household size was 2.34 and the average family size was 3.01.

Age spread: 22.5% under the age of 18, 11.6% from 18 to 24, 31.5% from 25 to 44, 20.2% from 45 to 64, and 14.1% who were 65 years of age or older. The median age was 36 years. For every 100 females, there were 110.0 males. For every 100 females age 18 and over, there were 113.6 males.

The median income for a household in the city was $35,558, and the median income for a family was $46,063. Males had a median income of $31,524 versus $22,628 for females. The per capita income for the city was $16,824. About 8.3% of families and 10.2% of the population were below the poverty line, including 11.5% of those under age 18 and 9.4% of those age 65 or over.

== Arts and culture ==
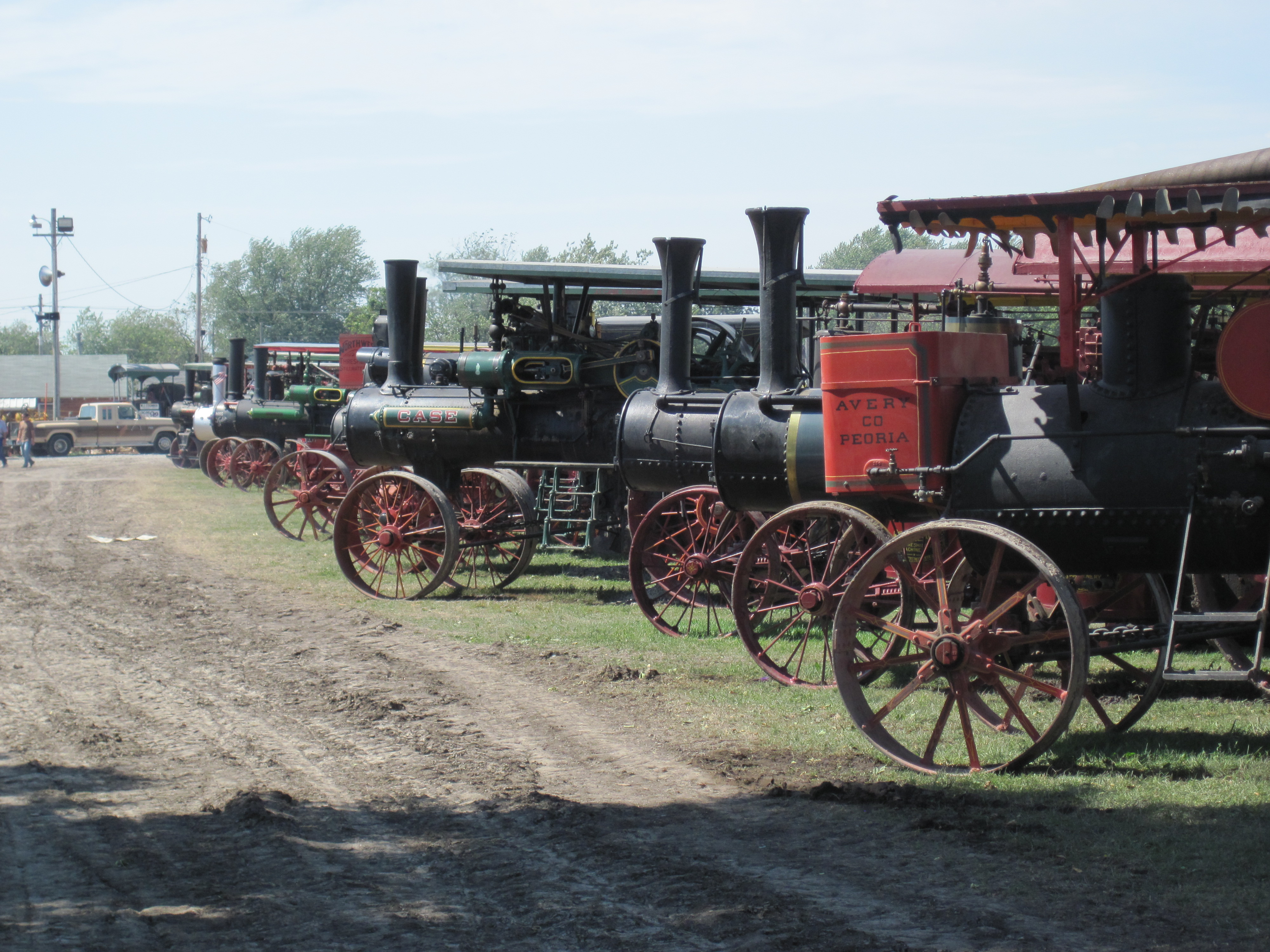
Steam tractor lineup at the 2010 Midwest Old Thresher's Reunion

Mount Pleasant is also home to the Midwest Old Thresher's Reunion which attracts a crowd numbering over 100,000 admissions annually during an extended five-day weekend which ends on Labor Day. The reunion dates back to 1950 and pays tribute to the agricultural heritage of the American Midwest in an extensive, highly interactive manner, with live-action exhibition-style displays centering on restored mechanical equipment, particularly steam engines, farm tractors, stationary gas engines, antique and classic cars, the narrow-gauge Midwest Central Railroad, and electric trolleys.

== Economy ==
Mount Pleasant is home to manufacturing, distribution and agribusiness companies. The more prominent businesses are Wal-Mart Distribution Center, Lomont Molding, Innovaire, Continental ContiTech, Ceco Building Systems and West Liberty Foods. Henry County Health Center, the Mount Pleasant Correctional Facility and Mount Pleasant Community School District are also larger employers for the city.

== Education ==
=== Public schools ===
The public school system in Mount Pleasant is administered by the Mount Pleasant Community School District. The district oversees the high school, middle school and four elementary schools, Harlan, Lincoln, Salem, and Van Allen. The WisdomQuest Education Center serves as an alternative high school for the district.

=== Higher education ===
The city was home to Iowa Wesleyan University, which, founded in 1842, ranked as the oldest coeducational college/university west of the Mississippi River. The P.E.O. Sisterhood, an international philanthropic organization for women, was founded on the campus in Mount Pleasant by seven Iowa Wesleyan students.

== Transportation ==
Amtrak, the national passenger rail system, provides service to Mount Pleasant, operating its California Zephyr daily in both directions between Chicago, Illinois, and Emeryville, California, across the bay from San Francisco.

U.S. Route 34 bypasses Mount Pleasant to the north, while U.S. Route 218/Iowa Highway 27 bypass the city to the east. These highways' former routes through the city are now designated as business routes.

The Mount Pleasant Municipal Airport (FAA Identifier: MPZ) is at an elevation of 730 ft (222.5 m) and is located 3 miles (4.8 km) southeast of the city. The airport started operations in March 1945. As of May 2014 it has 2 runways: Runway 15/33 is hard surfaced (asphalt) and is 4001 ft long × 75 ft wide (1220 m × 23 m) with runway edge lights; Runway 03/21 is turf and is 1965 ft long × 120 ft wide (599 m × 37 m) marked by yellow cones.

== Notable people ==
- Eric Allender (born 1956), computer scientist
- Warren Wallace Beckwith (1874–1955) - athlete, husband of Abraham Lincoln's granddaughter
- Belle Coddington (1842–1920), American Civil War nurse, teacher in Mount Pleasant
- Susan F. Ferree (1844–1919), journalist, temperance worker, suffragist, and women's rights activist
- James Harlan (1820–1899) – politician, president of Iowa Wesleyan College
- Mary Eunice Harlan (1846–1937) – daughter of James Harlan; wife of Robert Todd Lincoln
- Dana Holgorsen – head coach for the University of Houston football team
- Mike Leach (American football coach) (1961–2022) - American football coach, popularized the air raid offense under Hal Mumme as the offensive coordinator at Iowa Wesleyan University
- Leigh S. J. Hunt (1855–1933) – Superintendent of Schools in the 1880s
- Rachelle Keck – president of Grand View University and Briar Cliff University
- Henry Krieger-Coble (born 1992) – NFL tight end
- Jessie Wilson Manning (1855–1947) - author, lecturer
- Arabella Mansfield (1846–1911) – first female lawyer in the United States
- Harry F. Olson (1901–1982) - acoustical engineer at RCA Victor
- Carolyn Pendray (1881–1958) - first woman elected to the Iowa General Assembly
- Ricky Phillips (born 1952) - rock bassist with Styx; formerly with The Babys and Bad English
- Ab Saunders (1851–1883) - Wild west cowboy and outlaw
- Frederick A. Shannon (1921–1965) – herpetologist
- Newton J. Tharp (1867–1909) – architect, painter
- Fred Truck (born 1946) – painter, sculptor
- James Van Allen (1914–2006) – considered one of the country's foremost space scientists
- Christie Vilsack (born 1950) – former first lady of Iowa
- Tom Vilsack (born 1950) – former Mount Pleasant mayor, former governor of Iowa, and US Secretary of Agriculture
- Chris Voss – FBI hostage negotiator, author of Never Split the Difference
- Peggy Whitson (born 1960) - retired NASA Chief Astronaut, holds the record for most cumulative days in space by an American, graduated from Iowa Wesleyan University in 1981
