= Midwest Electric Railway =

Coordinates: 40.9541°N 91.5472°W

Overview
- Headquarters: Mt. Pleasant, Iowa
- Reporting mark: MERA (Note: Direct sources from the AAR/NMFTA cannot be publicly accessed/located, although such markings have been second-handedly verified via the FRA, ILDOT, and visual wise; however, these marks may be considered expired, reassigned, or unofficial as of 2009.)
- Locale: Mt. Pleasant, Henry County, Eastern Iowa
- Dates of operation: 1971–Present

Technical
- Track gauge: 4 ft 8 1/2 in (1,435 mm) standard gauge
- Length: 2.5 mi (4.0 km)

The Midwest Electric Railway (initialized MERA, reporting mark MERA) is a non-profit trolley operation located on the grounds of the Midwest Old Threshers Reunion in Mt. Pleasant, Iowa, United States. It is home to 10 pieces of trolley history that are regularly operated on a 2.5 mile loop surrounding the organization's campgrounds.

== Overview ==
The volunteer association runs a tourist railroad which operates electric trolleys around a 2.5 mile loop around the Midwest Old Threshers Reunion campground. Guest prices and hours of operation vary throughout the year based on the activities of the Midwest Old Threshers Association. The trolley operation is most active on the five days preceding Labor Day during the reunion. The trolleys operate on special holidays and when special organized groups reserve time. Visit the Old Threshers Reunion website for the latest information.

The campground's trolley tracks were originally constructed by the Midwest Electric Railway's volunteers and are still maintained today through volunteer efforts. Every year maintenance and reconstruction is organized and accomplished entirely through volunteer labor.

=== Location ===
The Midwest Electric Railway is located in the heart of Mt. Pleasant, Iowa on the campgrounds of the Midwest Old Thresher's Reunion sandwiched between Locust and S. Walnut Streets. The railroad crosses E. Thresher Road in two places. The main headquarters for MERA and trolley storage is in a silver-painted trolley barn which is located on S. Locust Road less than a half mile from south of Thresher Road.

=== History ===
The Midwest Electric Railway, a not-for-profit educational organization, was founded in 1971. Its goal at that time was to preserve historic electric-powered passenger trolleys that had operated in Iowa and transport passengers around the campground during the Midwest Old Thresher's Reunion. The original trolley stops were the trolley depot, the trolley barn, and campers' gate.

Today, the purpose of the organization remains largely the same including the preservation of non-Iowa operated electric rolling stock. Trolley Stops currently include The Trolley Depot, the Trolley Barn, the Log Village, Midway, South 40, and Campers' Gate.

== Equipment ==
=== Trolleys ===
| No. | Image | Type | Builder | Built | Former Operator | Acquired | Notes |
|---|---|---|---|---|---|---|---|
| 9 | | Suburban Passenger Service/Express Car | Barber Car Co. | 1912 | Albia Interurban Railway, Southern Iowa Railway | 1968 | 1912 as a 4-wheel car (original); Southern Iowa Railway to an 8-wheel car (rebuilt) |
| 320 | | High-speed Heavy Interurban Car/Intercity and commuter travel | Jewett Car Company | 1914 | Chicago Aurora and Elgin Railroad | 1968 | Heavyweight for high-speed long-distance travel (up to 80 MPH) |
| 381 | | City Streetcar/One-man Safety Car | Perley Thomas | 1930 | Knoxville Power & Light, Waterloo, Cedar Falls and Northern Railway | 1971 | Last streetcar to run in an Iowa municipality; The “Safety Car”, a landmark design which eliminated all boarding and alighting mishaps as doors were open only when the car was stopped. Improved safety in one-man operation. A landmark design in which boarding and alighting mishaps were eliminated, since doors opened only when car was stopped and car could not start until doors closed |
| 3 | | Snow sweeper | McGuire-Cummings Manufacturing Company | 1911 | Iowa Traction Railway | 1973 | Acquired by Iowa Trolley Park in 1989, now preserved in Rockhill Trolley Museum. |
| 1718 | | City & Interurban, Open Cars/Open Bench Summer Cars | Rio de Janeiro, Brazil, 1911 using the American design of J.G. Brill Company, Philadelphia, Pennsylvania; Running gear by Westinghouse Electric Co. | | Rio de Janeiro Tramway | 1973 | Thousands of streetcars in America were of this patented “Naragansett” design, featuring a full-length upper side step for easy boarding; Favorites for summer travel |
| 1779 | | City & Interurban, Open Cars/Open Bench Summer Cars | Rio de Janeiro, Brazil, 1911 using the American design of J.G. Brill Company, Philadelphia, Pennsylvania; Running gear by Westinghouse Electric Co. | | Rio de Janeiro Tramway | 1970 | Thousands of streetcars in America were of this patented “Naragansett” design, featuring a full-length upper side step for easy boarding; Favorites for summer travel |
| 4476 | | PCC streetcar | St. Louis Car Company | 1949 | Toronto Transportation Commission | 1982 | Acquired by Gomaco Trolley Company in 2002 |
| 3093 | | PCC streetcar | Pullman-Standard | 1944 | Massachusetts Bay Transit Authority | 1992 | Acquired by Gomaco Trolley Company in 2002 |
| 3226 | | PCC streetcar | Pullman-Standard | 1945 | Massachusetts Bay Transit Authority | 1992 | Acquired by Gomaco Trolley Company in 2002 |
| 3279 | | Line car | Boston Elevated Railway | 1912 | Massachusetts Bay Transportation Authority | 1995 | |
| 1100 | | Freight Car/Flat Car | American Car Company | 1917 | Keokuk, Iowa | 2002 | |
| 1705 | | PCC streetcar | St. Louis Car Company | 1949 | Pittsburgh Railways | | sold Feb 2018 to Donald Kirk (for restoration and operation at a new McCloud (CA) Transportation Park project) |
| 1811 | | Peter Witt streetcar | Carminati & Toselli, Milan, 1927; Running gear by Italian General Electric | 1930s | Azienda Trasporti Milanesi | 2025 | Lightweight for fast city service in narrow streets; Lightweight safety car: doors only open when stopped. #1811 was displayed in St. Louis for publicize the proposed of the Loop Trolley project from 2005 to 2014. |
| 1945 | | Peter Witt streetcar | Carminati & Toselli, Milan, 1927; Running gear by Italian General Electric | 1930s | Azienda Trasporti Milanesi | 2002 | Lightweight for fast city service in narrow streets; Lightweight safety car: doors only open when stopped. #1811 was displayed in St. Louis for publicize the proposed of the Loop Trolley project from 2005 to 2014. |

=== Structures ===
The Chicago Burlington and Quincy depot from Yarmouth, Iowa, was donated and moved to Old Thresher's fairgrounds; it was originally used as the trolley ticket office and gift shop. The building was used for storage and the aesthetic appearance of having an old building near a trolley stop, but again serves as a ticket office.

The Trolley Barn was built in the early 1970s to store the growing stock of equipment. While the building has no real antique value, it provides a well-used maintenance pit for trolley maintenance, room for trolley storage, and a health & welfare room for volunteer operators and conductors.

== Special events ==
=== Midwest Old Thresher's Reunion ===
Every year during the week leading up to Labor Day weekend, volunteer operators and conductors regularly operate the trolleys to ferry campground dwellers and rail enthusiasts around the 2.5 mile campground loop. The Log Village at the south end of the loop provides the tourist a view of 19th century life on the Iowa prairie. Camper's use the trolley's to commute to the main fairgrounds to visit daily attractions.

=== Haunted Trolley Ride ===
Every year near Halloween, the Midwest Electric Railway operates a haunted trolley ride.

=== Trolley School ===
Once a year at in June, Midwest Electric Railway holds a Trolley School to teach anyone to operate a Trolley, then allowing them time to operate some of the fleet.

== See also ==
- List of United States railroads
  - List of Iowa railroads
- List of heritage railroads in the United States
- List of railway museums
