= The Grand Views =

Viewfinder (formerly The Grand Views)
- Frequency: Monthly magazine
- Circulation: 2,000 monthly
- Founded: 1949
- Based in: Grand View Student Center, Room 150A; 1331 Grandview Avenue; Des Moines, IA 50316; United States
- Website: viewfindergv.com

Viewfinder is the official student magazine of Grand View University in Des Moines, Iowa, published in print and online via viewfindergv.com. It was founded as a newspaper in 1949, and its publication is funded by advertising revenues as well as funds from the student activities fees.

The magazine is published once a month during the fall and spring semesters. The printed circulation is 2,000 and is distributed mostly on campus.

Most issues of Viewfinder consist of 24 pages, and sections include campus culture, arts and entertainment, reviews, people and features.

Formerly a print newspaper, the Grand Views was printed primarily in black and white until 2005 when spot color was added. The conversion to a magazine took place in fall 2015. The magazine is full color and features the writing, photography and design of more than 40 students every year.
