= Danny Neville =

American college basketball coach

Current position
- Title: Head coach
- Team: Rocky Mountain
- Conference: Frontier
- Record: 31–4

Biographical details
- Education: Grand View University

Coaching career (HC unless noted)
- 2010–2012: Presentation (assistant)
- 2012–2015: Jamestown (assistant)
- 2015–2023: Jamestown
- 2024–2025: Langston (assistant)
- 2025–present: Rocky Mountain

Head coaching record
- Overall: 209–88
- Tournaments: 11–5 (NAIA)

Accomplishments and honors

Championships
- Frontier tournament (2026); Frontier regular season (2026); NSAA regular season (2017); GPAC tournament (2019); GPAC regular season (2023)

Danny Neville is an American college basketball coach, currently the head coach at Rocky Mountain College in Billings, Montana. Neville was previously the head men's basketball coach at the University of Jamestown in Jamestown, North Dakota, from 2015 to 2023.

Neville is from Bondurant, Iowa, where he attended Bondurant-Farrar High School. He played basketball there under his dad, Steve Neville, and broke several school records and went to the state tournament one time. After high school, he attended Grand View University where he played basketball. Over his last two years of playing, Grand View went 50–17, went to two national tournaments, and were at one time ranked No. 7 in the country. He graduated with a bachelor's degree in Sports Management, then went to Concordia University Irvine and received a master's degree in Athletic Administration. From there he went to Presentation College and was assistant basketball coach there until 2012 when he was hired as an assistant coach under Justin Wieck at the University of Jamestown where he served for three seasons.

In August 2015, Neville was named the head men's basketball coach of the University of Jamestown, replacing Alan Magnani who had been the head coach of the Jimmies for only one year. In the 2018–19 season, Jamestown moved from the North Star Athletic Association (NSAA) to the Great Plains Athletic Conference (GPAC). Since his hiring, the Jimmies have gone 105–55, won one NSAA regular season conference championship, and one GPAC tournament championship. In 2019, Jamestown made it to NAIA tournament for the first time in the Neville era and made it to the second round before losing to Spring Arbor University by a score of 81–85.

Neville announced his resignation as head coach on November 16, 2023.

Neville was announced as the associate head coach of Langston University on July 1, 2024.

On March 31, 2025, Neville was announced as the next head coach of Rocky Mountain College.

== Head coaching record ==
Record table
Season	Team	Overall	Conference	Standing	Postseason
Jamestown Jimmies (North Star Athletic Association) (2015–2018)
2015–16	Jamestown	17–12	7–6	4th	
2016–17	Jamestown	18–14	11–5	1st	
2017–18	Jamestown	20–10	9–7	2nd	
Jamestown Jimmies (Great Plains Athletic Conference) (2018–2023)
2018–19	Jamestown	29–6	15–5	2nd	NAIA Second Round
2019–20	Jamestown	18–13	9–11	7th	
2020–21	Jamestown	22–9	14–6	3rd	NAIA Quarterfinal
2021–22	Jamestown	26-10	12–8	T–4th	NAIA Round of 16
2022–23	Jamestown	27–7	15–5	T–1st	NAIA Round of 16
2023–24	Jamestown	1–3	0–0		
Jamestown:		178–84 (.679)	93-52 (.641)		
Rocky Mountain (Frontier Conference) (2025–present)
2025–26	Rocky Mountain	31–4	20–2	1st	NAIA Quarterfinal
Rocky Mountain:		31–4 (.886)	20–2 (.909)		
Total:		209-88 (.700)			
National champion Postseason invitational champion Conference regular season champion Conference regular season and conference tournament champion Division regular season champion Division regular season and conference tournament champion Conference tournament champion
