= Fred Truck =

American artist (born 1946)

Frederick John Truck
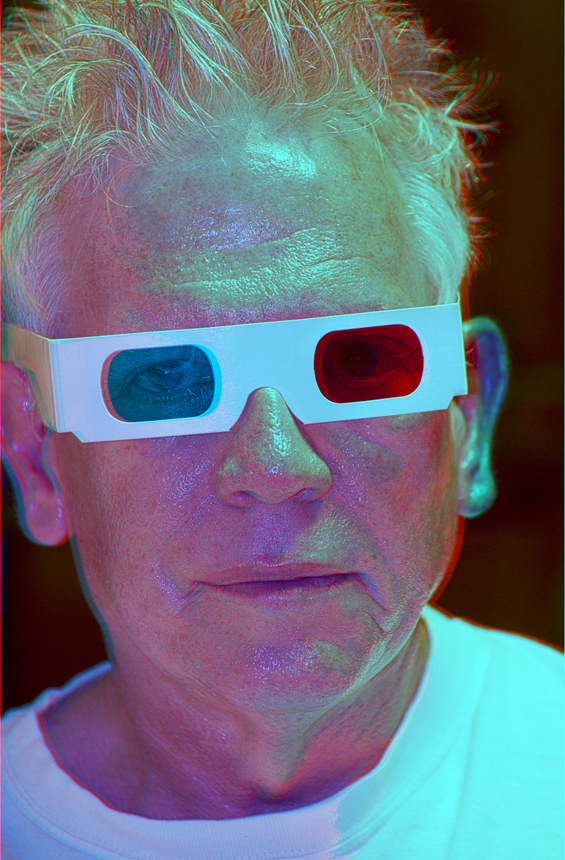
- Born: Frederick John Allender; September 6, 1946; Mount Pleasant, Iowa, USA
- Education: Iowa Wesleyan University
- Occupations: visual artist; sculptor; performance artist; writer
- Spouse: Lorna Ruth Truck
- Children: Benjamin Isaac Truck
- Writing career
- Years active: 1965-present

Fred Truck is an American artist currently living in Des Moines, Iowa. He is noted for his performance art and cartoon imagery using painting, sculpture and digital constructions. In 1986, he was a co-creator of the Art Com Electronic Network, an online collaboration site for artists during the early days of the Internet. His work has been exhibited at the Museum of Modern Art (MoMA) as well as other museums and galleries in the USA and Japan. Throughout his career, his media have included software, virtual reality, graphics, sculpture, born-digital prints, and computer graphic design.

He is the brother of Eric Allender.

== Performance art ==
In 1979 Truck organized the Des Moines Festival of the Avant Garde. Performance artists from around the world were invited not to come to Des Moines. They sent ideas for performance works which were performed by Truck and a small group of local performers. The performances were stored in the "Performance Bank", a computer-mediated performance art database developed with an Osborne 1 computer and DBase II. Truck demoed the Performance Bank to Carl Loeffler during the 1984 Inter Dada performance arts festival in San Francisco. Later in 1984, Truck purchased a Macintosh 512K and migrated the contents of the Performance Bank to the Electric Bank. Throughout 1985, Truck and Loeffler collaborated on the development of what became the ACEN.

== Electronic works ==
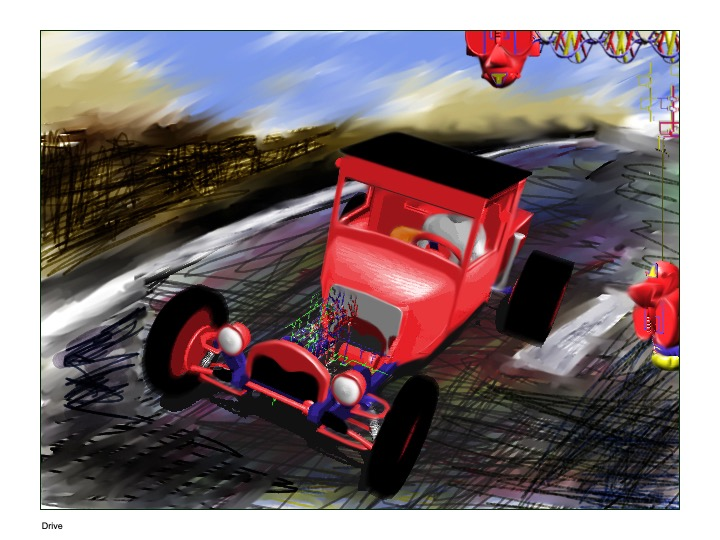
Born Digital Hot Rod Hot rod based on 1929 Ford Closed Cab Pickup, but is digitally powered by an imaginary computer circuit. The figure in upper right corner is derived from the Mayan Sun God, also powered by an imaginary computer circuit. (Print)

In 1986 Fred Truck founded, with Carl Loeffler, the Art Com Electronic Network (ACEN), the first online network for artists on the Whole Earth 'Lectronic Link (The WELL). The network ran continuously for 13 years, using the software Truck had written. In this same period Truck created his software ArtEngine, which compares visual objects with accompanying written descriptions and then uses congruences between the two objects to create a third visual object.

In 1993 Truck created The Labyrinth, a virtual reality piece which allowed the user to experience the myth of Daedalus' escape from the prison of Minos using an ornithopter designed by Leonardo da Vinci. This work was shown at the 1993 SIGGRAPH Machine Culture art show.

== Exhibitions ==
The Adventures of Mr. Milkbottle, 29 October 1998 through 30 November 1998, Vail Geisler Gallery, Des Moines, Iowa

Almost Warm & Fuzzy: Childhood and Contemporary Art, 9 September 1999 through 12 November 1999, Des Moines Art Center, Des Moines, Iowa

It's All About Money: Mr. Milk Bottle and the Badge of Quality Corporation, 7 June 2001 through 30 July 2001, Steven Vail Galleries, Des Moines, Iowa

By Design IA01, 25 August 2001 through 30 November 2001, Des Moines Art Center, Des Moines, Iowa

The Conference Room, 5 March 2004 through 10 March 2004, Karilyn Sherwood Gallery, Des Moines, Iowa

Portrait of the Artist as a Truck 1 August 2007 through 31 August 2007 Shizuoka-ken, Numazu-shi, Japan

Here and There: Photography as a cross-cultural mirror, Des Moines, USA and Shizuoka, Japan, 9 August 2007 through 15 August 2007

== Smithsonian collection ==
Truck's papers reside in the Smithsonian Archives of American Art since 2020. They represent his work in the early years of digital networking with performance artists and other multimedia artists in addition to his own digital works. The collection includes performance art, concrete poetry, social media, software, sculpture and prints of digital origin, from the years 1965 through 2019.
