= Humphrey Center =

- Grand View College (Old Main)
- U.S. National Register of Historic Places
- Photo from c. 1901

- Location within Iowa Location within the United States
- Location: 1200 Grandview Ave. Des Moines, Iowa
- Coordinates: 41°37′15″N 93°36′15″W
- Area: approximately 2 acres (0.81 ha)
- Built: 1895
- Architect: Marinus Jensen; Frank James
- NRHP reference No.: 78001252
- Added to NRHP: May 23, 1978

The Humphrey Center, also known as Old Main, is a historic building located on the campus of Grand View University in Des Moines, Iowa, United States. It was listed on the National Register of Historic Places in 1978.

== History ==
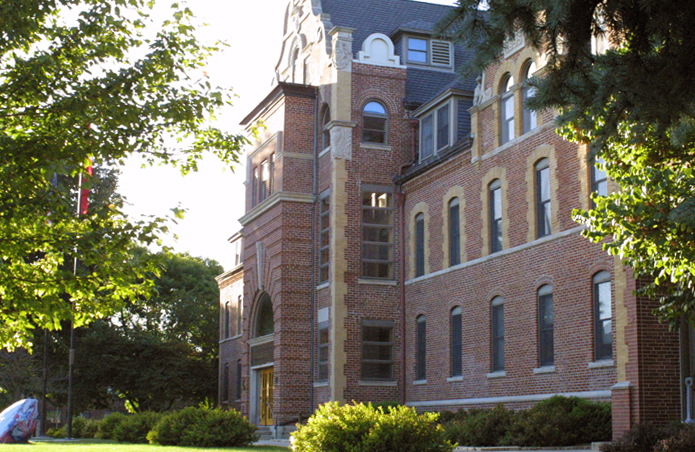
The Humphrey Center

The Danish Evangelical Lutheran Church in America began planning Grand View College in 1893, and the school opened in 1896. This building was completed in 1895 and housed all of Grand View's operations for a half century. It was designed by Marinus Jensen and Frank James. The Danish Renaissance elements in the building's design was important to the Danish immigrants to the United States who founded the college. Its features are identical to those found at the Belmont Seminary in Bedford, Virginia. They are reminiscent of the architectural style that was popular during the reign of King Christian IV (1596-1648). The building contained the residence for the college's president and his family as well as all its students, the cook, and other personnel. The library, classrooms, chapel, bookstore and other facilities were also housed there.

In 1997 the building was renovated and it was renamed the Humphrey Center at that time. It now houses the administrative offices for the university.
