= Eric Allender =

American computer scientist (born 1956)

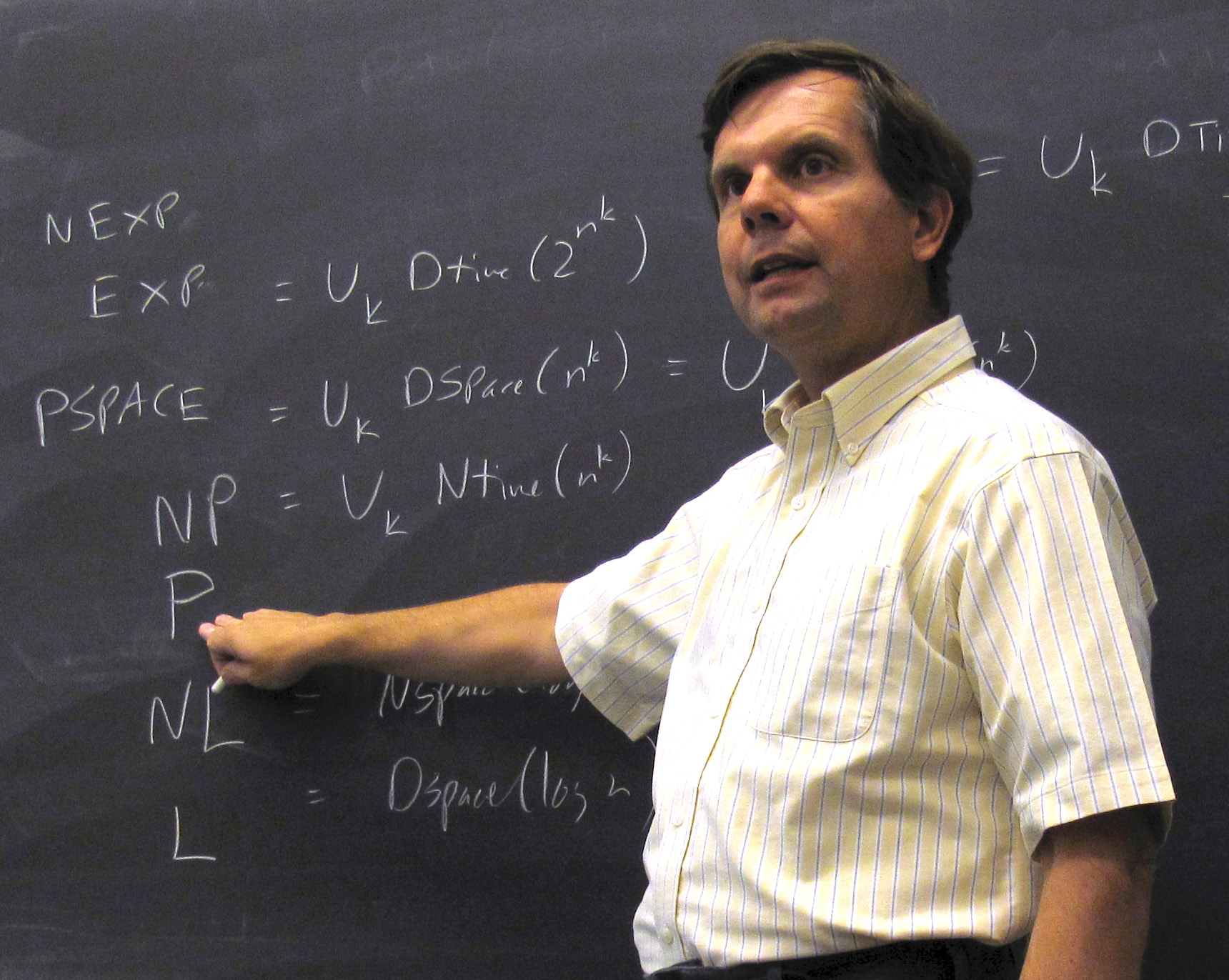
- Born: 1956 (age 69–70); Mount Pleasant, Iowa
- Citizenship: American
- Education: Georgia Institute of Technology
- Spouse: Claire Ellen Todd
- Awards: ACM Distinguished Member
- Scientific career
- Institutions: Rutgers University
- Doctoral advisor: Kimberly King

Eric Warren Allender (born 1956) is an American computer scientist active in the field of computational complexity theory.

In 2006 he was inducted as a Fellow of the Association for Computing Machinery. Since 2023 he has been a distinguished professor emeritus at Rutgers University, where he chaired the Department of Computer Science from 2006 until 2009.

== Biography ==
Allender went to High School in Mount Pleasant, Iowa. He graduated from the University of Iowa in 1979 with a double major in Computer Science and Theater. He then graduated from the Georgia Institute of Technology with a Ph.D. in Computer Science in 1985.

After graduation, he became a professor at Rutgers University, where he stayed for the remainder of his career.

Allender’s research focuses on computational complexity theory, including circuit complexity, structural complexity, and the computational limits of low-level complexity classes.

He is the brother of Fred Truck.
