= Midwest Central Railroad =

Heritage railroad

Coordinates: 40.9541°N 91.5495°W

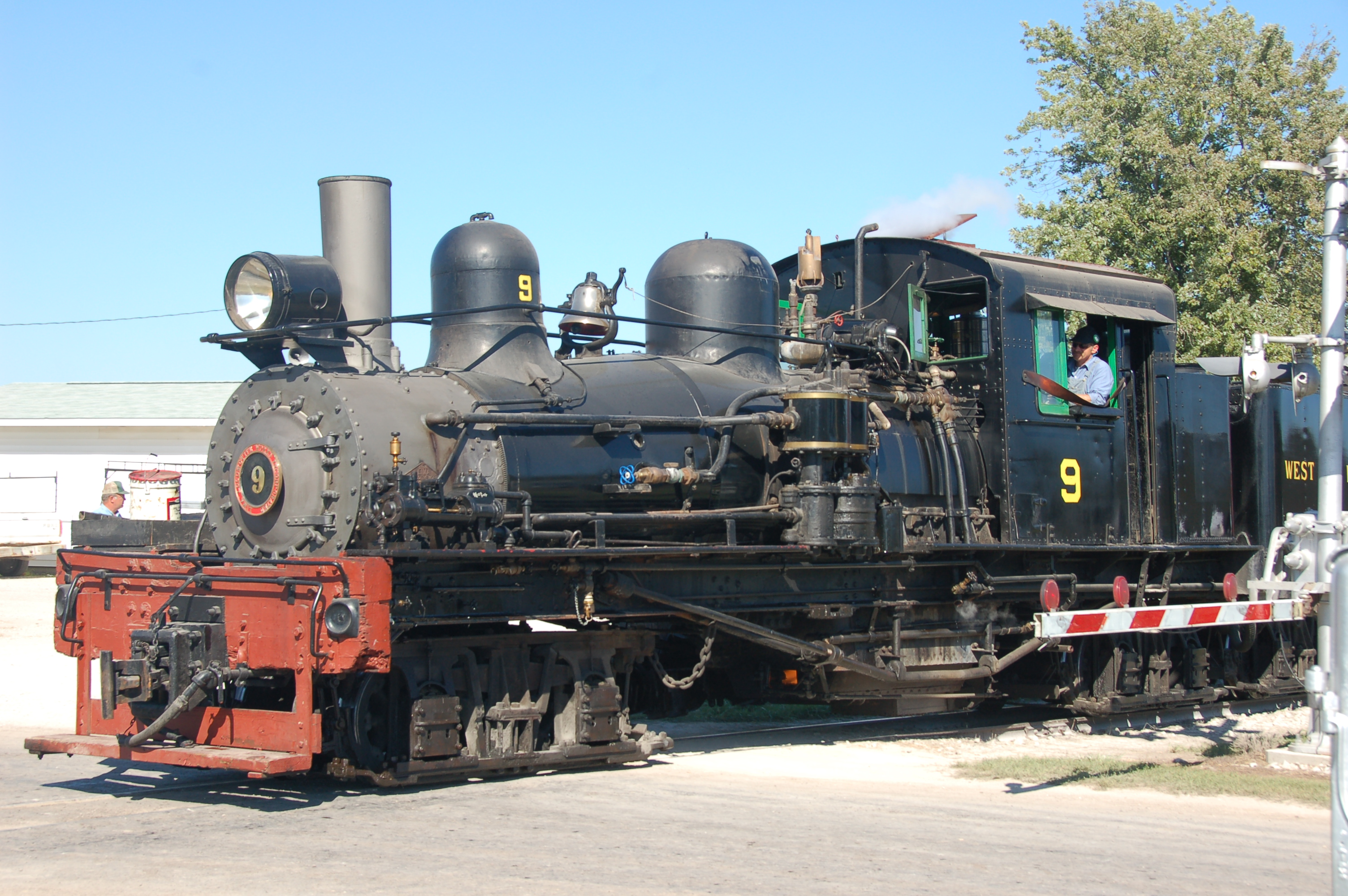
Midwest Central Railroad No. 9 in 2007

The Midwest Central Railroad is a 3 ft (914 mm) narrow gauge heritage railroad operating within the confines of Mount Pleasant, Iowa's McMillan Park, site of the Midwest Old Thresher's Reunion. The railroad is a registered, 501(c)(3) non-profit organization. The mainline track is a 1 mile (1.6 kilometer) loop with traffic moving in a clockwise direction regulated by an electrically signaled block system. The mainline loop features two stations: at the north end, the original Hillsboro, Iowa, depot along with a Milwaukee Road signal tower; and at the south end, a newer wood frame/metal sided building.

== Locomotives ==
The Midwest Central has six steam locomotives: two are operational, three are awaiting in-depth boiler inspections, and one has a new boiler and awaits complete reassembly.

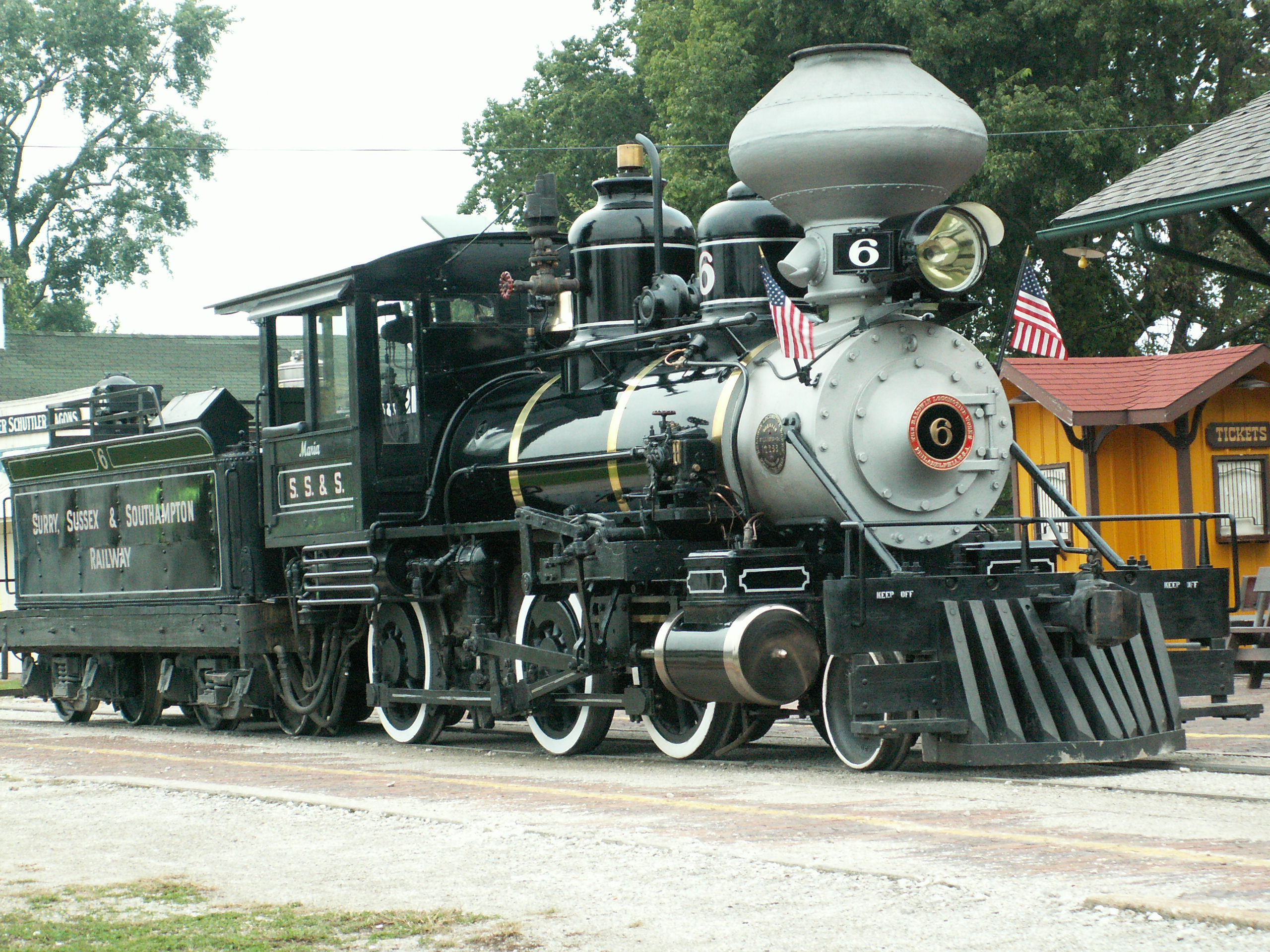
1891 Baldwin No. 6

- No. 6 is a 2-6-0 built by Baldwin Locomotive Works in 1891 for the Surry, Sussex and Southampton Railway in Virginia. It was sold to the Argent Lumber (see the Midwest Central's website and the "Taplines" website for more information) of South Carolina in the late 1920s, and bought by the Midwest Central (along with No. 2) in 1960.

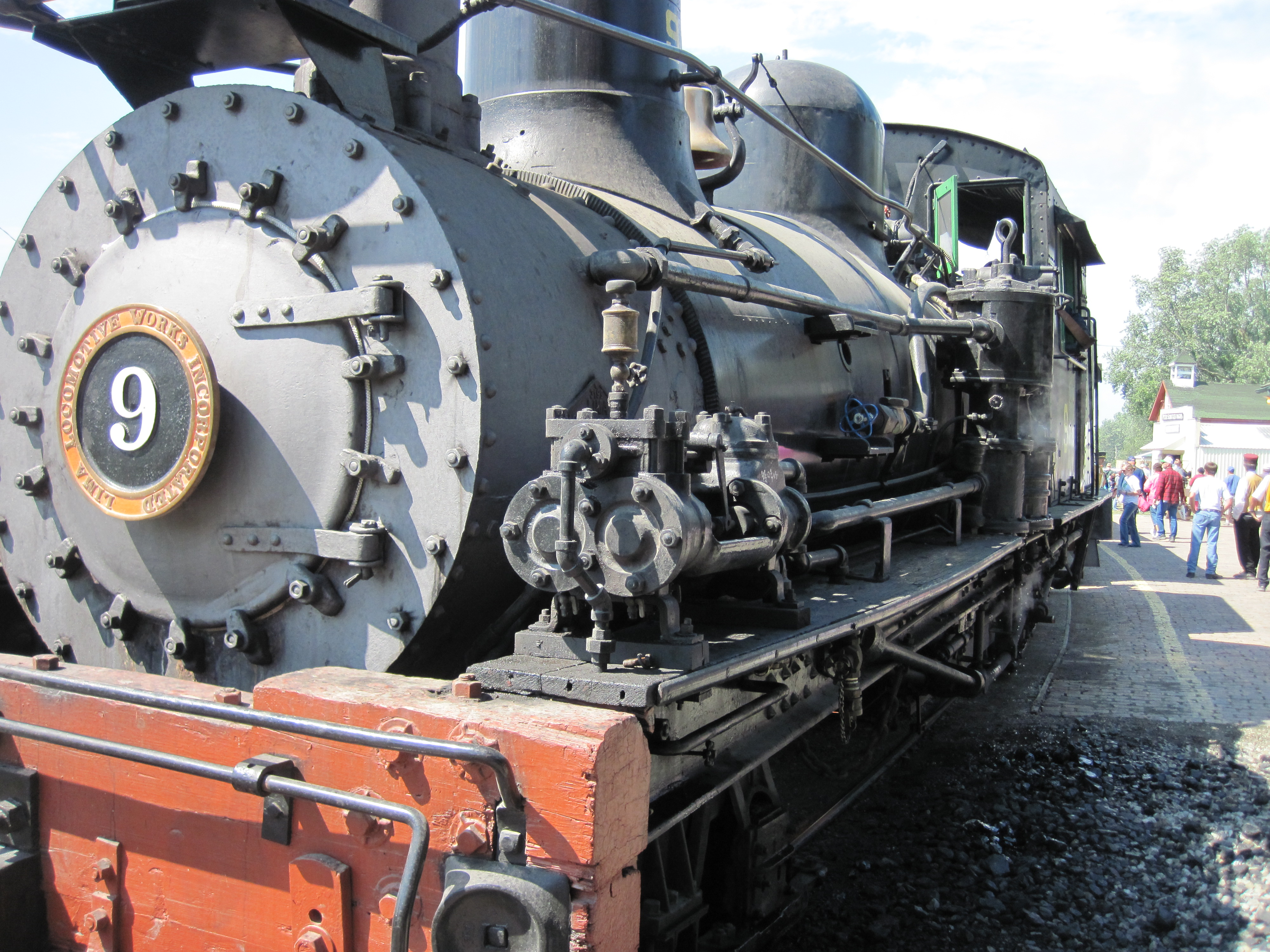
1923 Lima Shay No. 9.

- No. 9 is a Class C (3-truck) 80 ton Shay locomotive built by Lima Locomotive Works in 1923. Originally owned and operated at the West Side Lumber Company of California, it was acquired by the Midwest Central in 1966. In 2011, the Midwest Central and the Georgetown Loop Railroad entered into a multi-year lease agreement to bring No. 9 to Federal Railroad Administration (FRA) standards and use it for revenue passenger service. No. 9 returned to the Midwest Central in June, 2019.

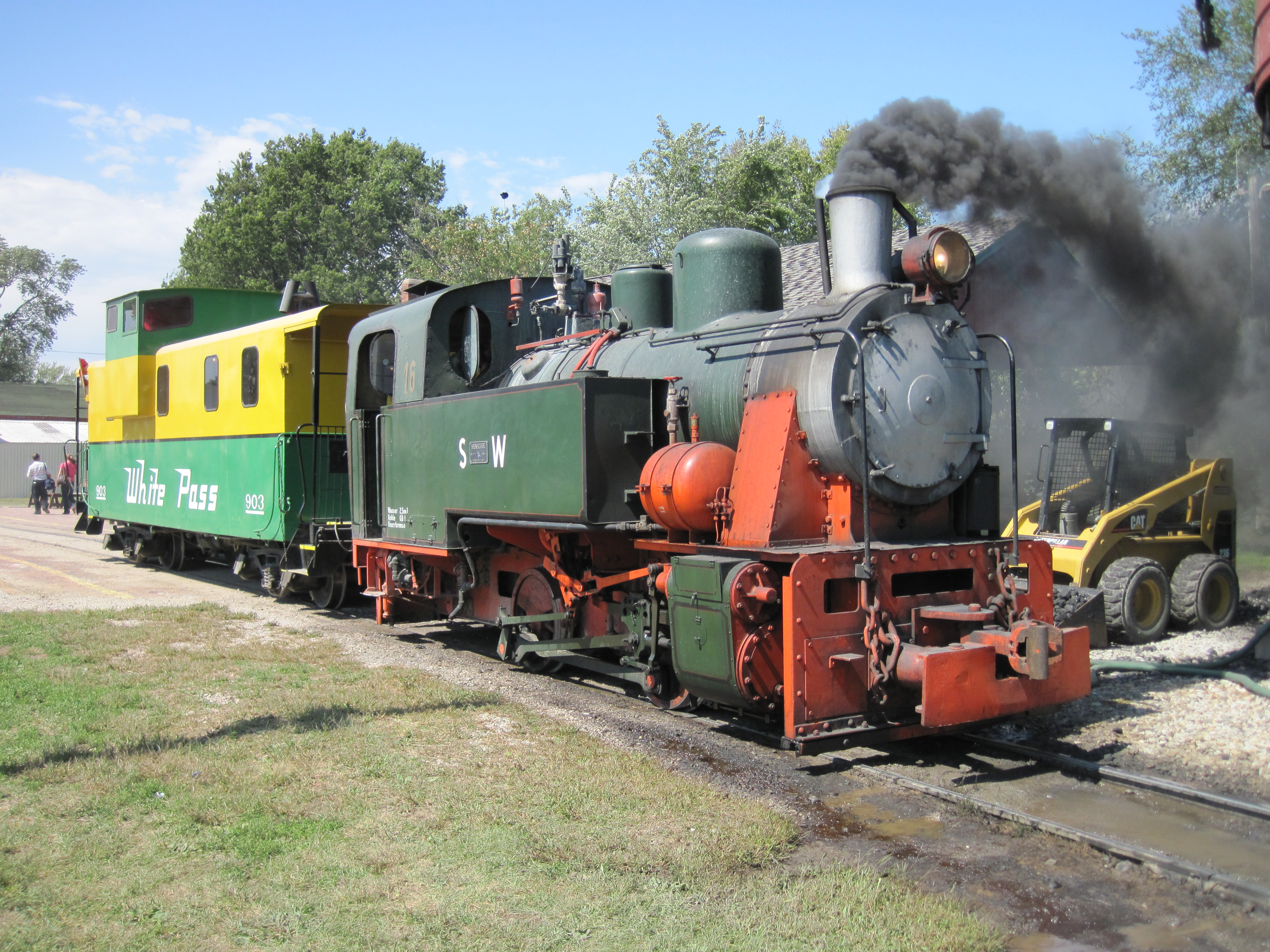
1951 Henschel No. 16.

- No. 16 is an 18-ton 0-4-0 tank locomotive built by Henschel of Germany in 1951. Originally built to use 900 mm gauge, it was altered to run on Midwest Central's 3 ft (914 mm) narrow gauge track. In 2011, No. 16 was taken out of service for an in-depth boiler inspection. The inspection date and final disposition of this locomotive has not been determined.

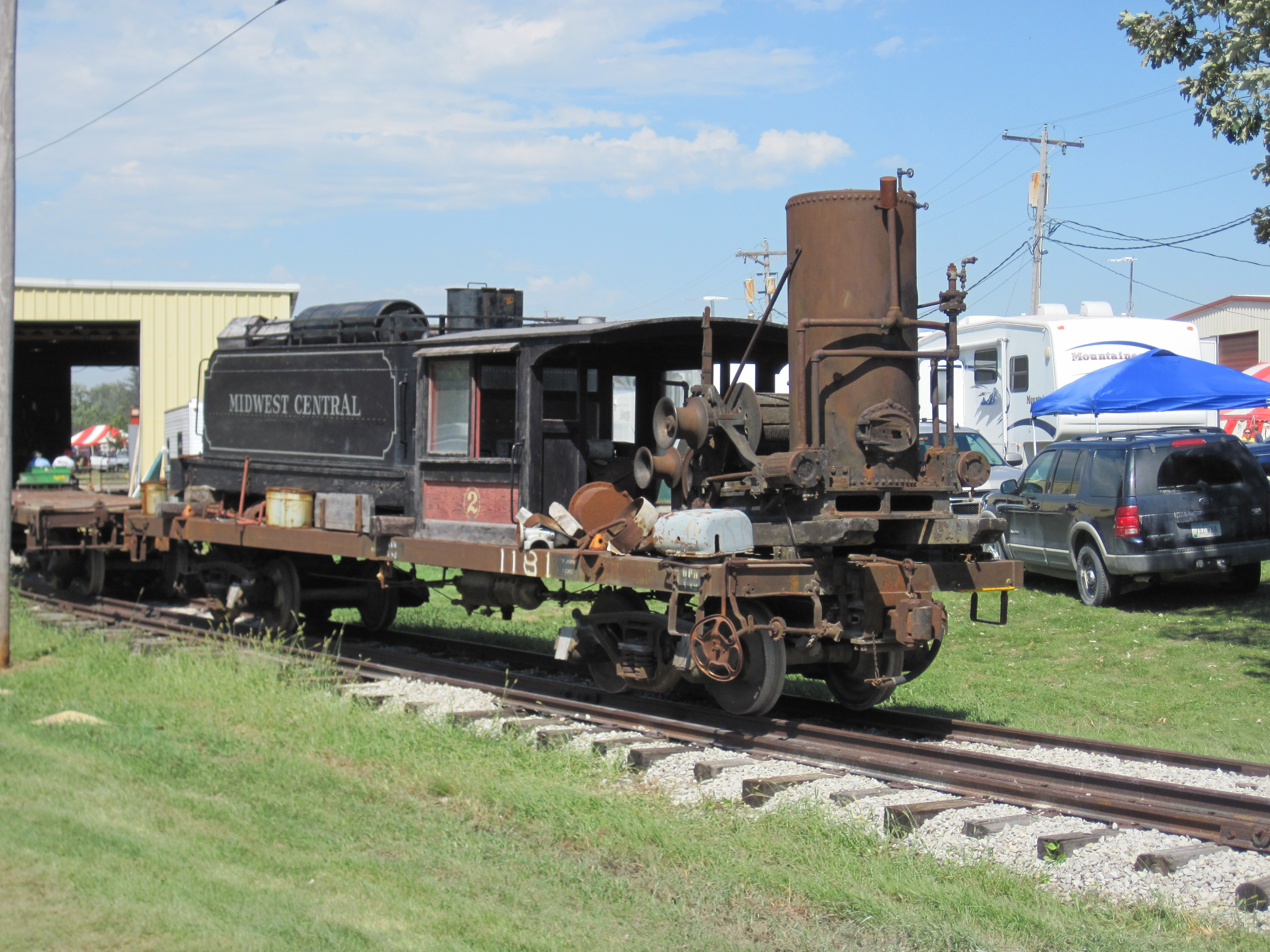
1906 Baldwin 2-6-0 No. 2, dismantled, awaiting restoration.

- No. 2 is a 2-6-0 built by Baldwin Locomotive Works in 1906. No. 2 came with No. 6 from Argent Lumber of South Carolina. No. 2 ran for many years until it was determined the boiler had sufficiently deteriorated to warrant replacement. A boiler built by Lund Machine Works of New Ulm, Minnesota, is on-site with the locomotive awaiting reassembly. The Midwest Central has received several cash grants to help finance the rebuilding project.
- Coahuila y Zacatecas No. 1 is a 2-8-0 built by Baldwin Locomotive Works in 1897. It was owned and operated by Mexico's Coahuila and Zacatecas Railroad. According to the RGUSRail website, CyZ "... was a narrow gauge railroad that began operating in January 1898 linking Saltillo and Avalos in central Mexico mainly hauling iron ore to smelters in San Luis Potosi, Monterrey and Torreón as well as providing transport for several thousand mine workers and their families..." CyZ No. 1 originally burned wood, was converted to coal shortly after delivery to CyZ, and eventually converted to oil. The chassis and running gear appear to be sound but the boiler needs repair.
- Argent No. 1 is a 2-6-0 built by H. K. Porter in 1914. Argent No. 1 was originally owned by Beaufort County Lumber Company of North Carolina with ownership later transferred to Argent Lumber. After Argent Lumber went bankrupt and was liquidated, Argent No. 1 resided in a city park, eventually being purchased by Florida's "Petticoat Junction Theme Park" until its closing in 1984. It then became part of a private collection in Warrior, Alabama. It was purchased by the Midwest Central in late 2018 arriving on site in April, 2019. The boiler needs extensive repairs and likely replacement; the chassis and running gear have not been evaluated.

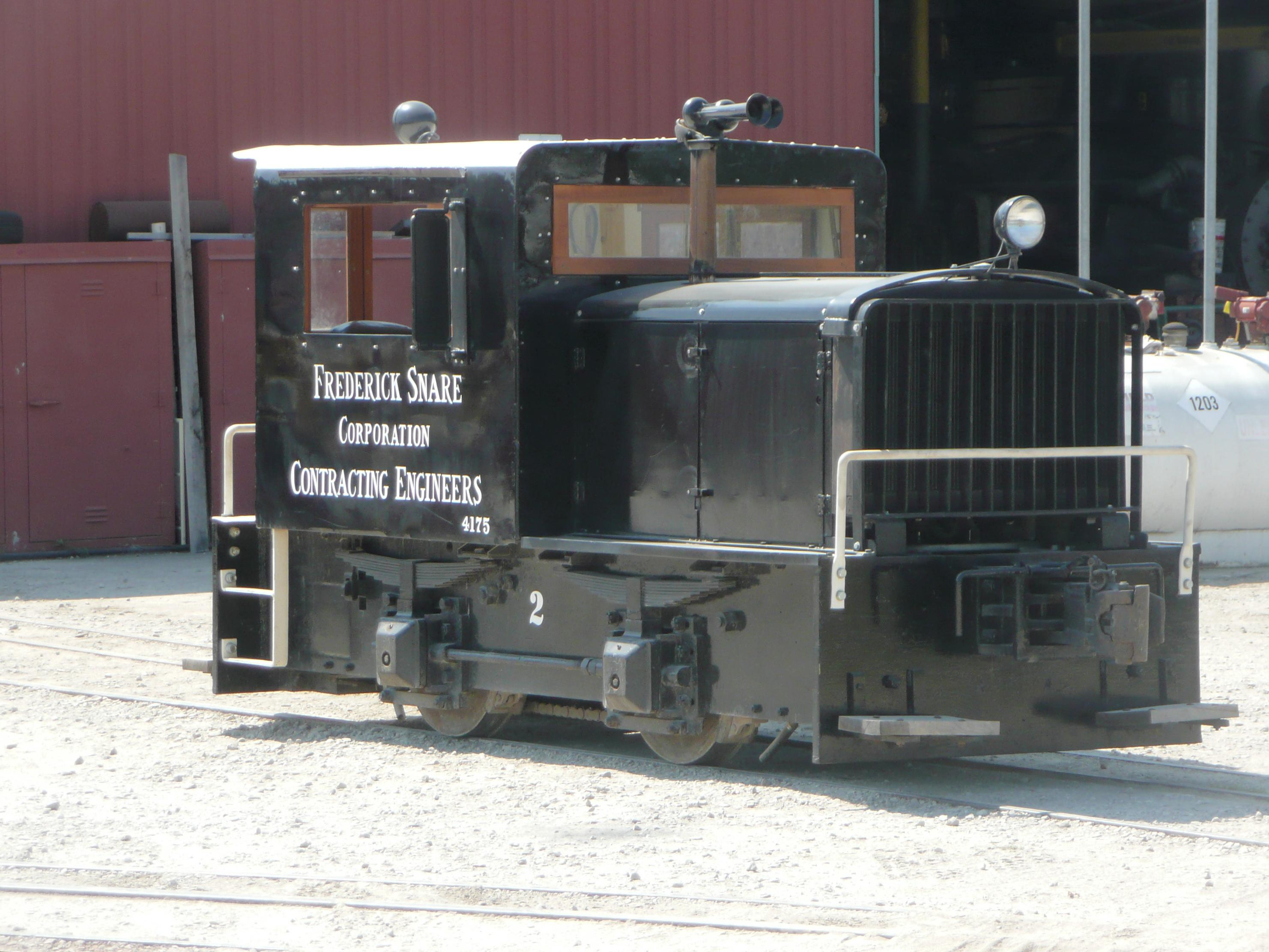
Frederick Snare No. 2 Vulcan gasoline switcher.

There are two Plymouth diesel locomotives that came from Carbon Limestone Company of Hillsville, Pennsylvania. The Plymouth's were originally 3 ft 2 in (965 mm) gauge and were regauged to 3 ft (914 mm) narrow gauge after arrival in Mt. Pleasant. No. D14 is used on a regular basis and No. D9 entered service in 2021. Frederick Snare No. 2 s a small Vulcan Iron Works gasoline switcher. A Ford Model A fireman truck and a Ford Model T foreman truck complete the power roster.

== Railroad cars ==
The Midwest Central's passenger cars were constructed at the Midwest Central shops using Southern Pacific flat cars, East Broadtop Railroad coal hopper cars, or were custom built on a Midwest Central fabricated chassis. There are 3 cabooses: one is all-metal from the White Pass and Yukon Railroad, the second is the last surviving Bellevue and Cascade narrow gauge caboose, numbered 055, and the third is wood construction on a SP flatcar frame by scaling up an HO model Florence and Cripple Creek Railroad caboose to full size. The Midwest Central has two Denver and Rio Grande Western Railroad (D&RGW) boxcars (3366 and 3007), one D&RGW gondola, and numerous D&RGW and White Pass and Yukon Route (WPYRR) flat cars. The flat cars range from fully restored (D&RGW Nos 6216 and 6206) to extremely rough. Many years ago, several East Broad Top coal hoppers were purchased and transported to Mt. Pleasant with the thoughts of using the brake gear, draft gear, steel frame and trucks as the starting point for creating additional passenger cars.

== Events ==
There are three primary operating events throughout the year: the "Old Threshers Reunion," held on the 5 days ending on Labor Day; "Midwest Haunted Rails," held on the last 3 Friday/Saturday pairs in October and "North Pole Express," held on the first 3 Saturday/Sunday pairs starting in December. The railroad is also available for hire for special occasions. During the off-season, equipment can be seen moving about as needed for repairs between the South Station, Old Thresher's Museum "B," and the main shop.

== See also ==
- List of heritage railroads in the United States
