= Rachelle Keck =

American lawyer and academic administrator

14th President of Grand View University
- Incumbent
- Assumed office June 2022
- Preceded by: Kent L. Henning

President of Briar Cliff University
- In office 2018–2022

Personal details
- Born: Rachelle L. Karstens; 1969 or 1970 (age 56–57)
- Children: 4
- Education: Wartburg College; University of Iowa; Drake University

Rachelle L. Karstens Keck (born 1969/1970) is an American lawyer and academic administrator serving as the fourteenth president of Grand View University since 2022. She was president of Briar Cliff University from 2018 to 2022.

== Life ==
Keck was born in 1969 or 1970. She has eight siblings. Keck lived in Mount Pleasant, Iowa and graduated from high school in Clinton. Keck earned a B.A. in psychology, summa cum laude, from Wartburg College. She completed a J.D. with distinction from University of Iowa College of Law. Keck graduated with a Ph.D. in education from Drake University in 2020. Her dissertation was titled, Sensemaking & Rainmaking: A Phenomenology Examining the Fundraising Experiences of Presidents at Private, Nonprofit Institutions of Higher Education. Robyn M. Cooper was her doctoral advisor.

Keck worked as an associate attorney in Montezuma, Iowa from 1995 to 1998. From 1998 to 2014, she owned and operated a law firm and a title and escrow company in Montezuma, Iowa. She was an assistant prosecutor in the Poweshiek County attorney's office from 1995 to 1999. She was a general counsel at Johnson & Johnson Enterprises, LLC, a business in Montezuma, from 2000 to 2014. From 2014 to 2015, she served as the director of planned giving at the University of Iowa Foundation. Keck was the executive director of philanthropy and alumni relations at Indian Hills Community College from 2015 to 2017.

Keck joined Briar Cliff University in 2017 as its chief of staff and university counsel. She was also an executive vice president and acting vice president of enrollment management. She served as president from 2018 to 2022. She was succeeded by interim president Patrick Jacobson-Schulte on July 1, 2022. In 2022, Keck became the fourteenth president of Grand View University, succeeding Kent L. Henning. She is the first female to lead the university.

== Personal life ==
Keck is married and has four children.
