= Christopher Voss =

American businessman and author (born 1957)

Chris Voss
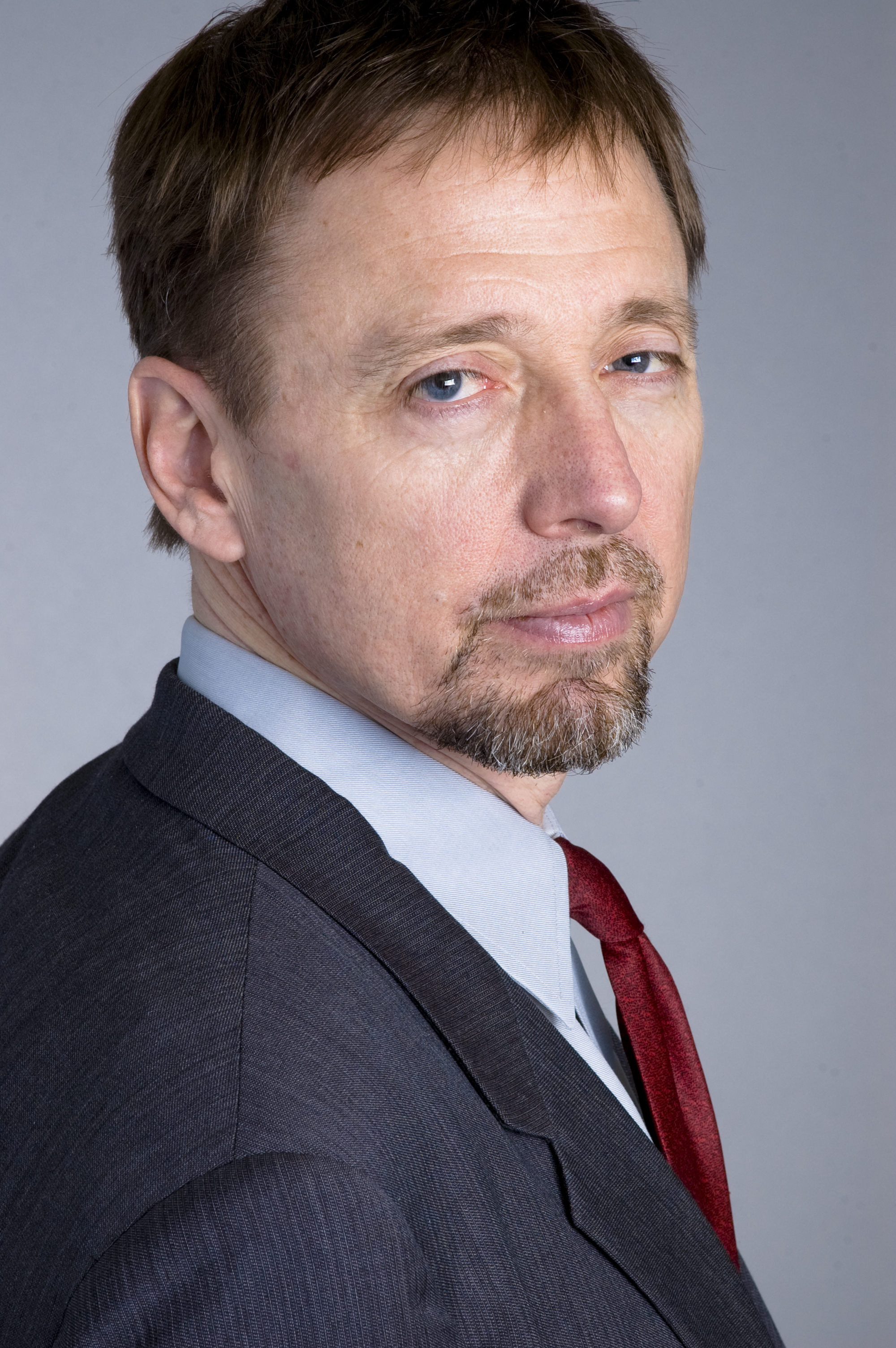
- Chris Voss in 2007.
- Born: November 28, 1957 (age 68); Mt. Pleasant, Iowa, U.S.
- Education: Iowa State University (BS); Harvard University (MPA)
- Occupations: Author, business consultant, former FBI hostage negotiator
- Website: Official website

Christopher Voss (born 28 November 1957) is an American businessman, author, and academic. Voss is a former FBI hostage negotiator, the CEO of The Black Swan Group Ltd, a company registered in Las Vegas, Nevada, and co-author of the book Never Split the Difference. He is an adjunct professor at Harvard Law School and Georgetown University's McDonough School of Business, and a lecturer at the Marshall School of Business at University of Southern California.

== Early life and education ==
Voss was born in Mt. Pleasant, Iowa. He earned a Bachelor of Science from Iowa State University and Master of Public Administration from the Harvard Kennedy School.

== Career ==
Voss was a member of the New York City Joint Terrorism Task Force from 1986 to 2000. He was involved in monitoring the New York City landmark bomb plot after spending three years investigating the 1993 World Trade Center bombing, one of 500 agents who were involved in the task. He was the "co-case agent" during the investigation of the 1996 TWA Flight 800 explosion.

In 1992, he received hostage negotiation training at the FBI Academy. He spent 24 years working in the FBI Crisis Negotiation Unit and was the FBI's chief international hostage and kidnapping negotiator from 2003 to 2007.

In 2006, he was the lead negotiator on the Jill Carroll case in Iraq as well as the Steve Centanni case in the Gaza Strip. Voss supervised additional hostage cases in the Philippines, Colombia and Haiti.

After working on more than 150 international hostage cases, he retired from the FBI in 2007 and founded The Black Swan Group. The Black Swan Group serves as a consultancy and trainer for both businesses and individuals on negotiation skills. He became an adjunct professor at Georgetown University's McDonough School of Business and a lecturer at the USC Marshall School of Business.

In 2016, Voss co-authored the book Never Split the Difference: Negotiating As If Your Life Depended On It, with journalist Tahl Raz.

Voss was given the Attorney General's Award for Excellence in Law Enforcement as well as the FBI Agents Association Award for Distinguished and Exemplary Service.

Voss is a regular commentator on CNBC, CNN, MSNBC, and Fox News, and NPR. He has also been featured in Forbes, The New York Times, Inc., Variety, and Time.

In 2019, he created and narrated a MasterClass, The Art of Negotiation.

== Books ==
- Never Split the Difference: Negotiating as If Your Life Depended on It (2016) ISBN 9781473535169
- The Full Fee Agent: How to Stack the Odds in Your Favor as a Real Estate Professional (2022) ISBN 1544536631
- Empathy and Understanding In Business (2024) ISBN 979-8986209791
