= Plymouth Locomotive Works =

Builder of small railroad locomotives

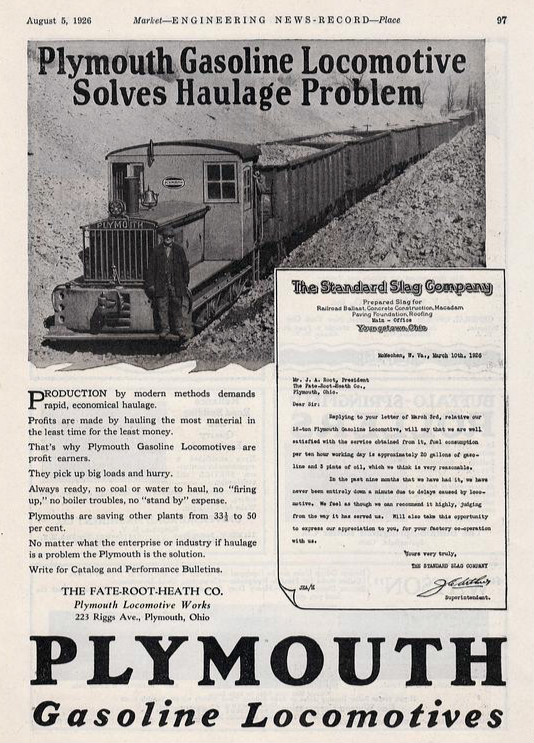
1926 ad for the company's gasoline-driven locomotives

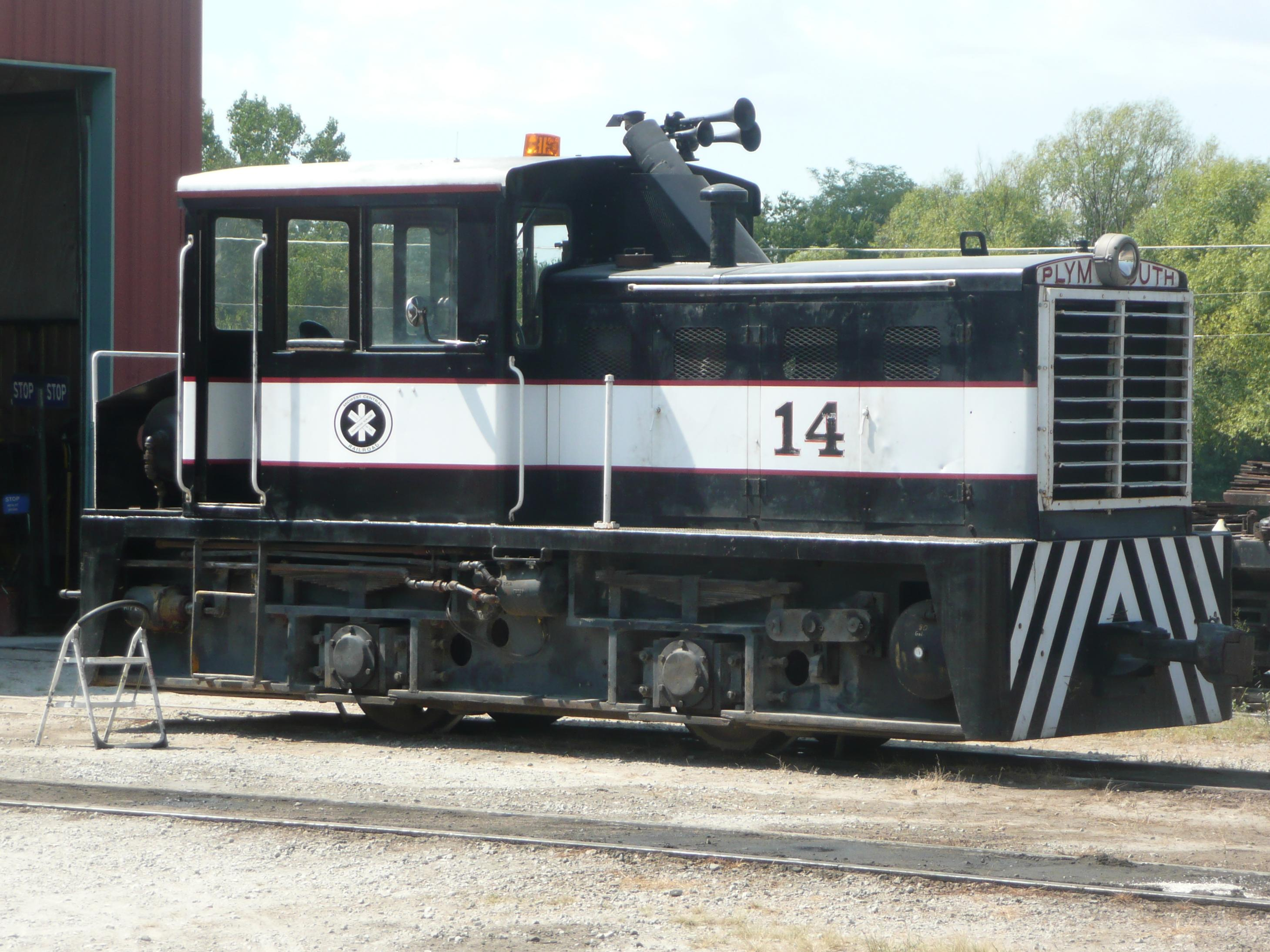
Three foot gauge Plymouth locomotive at the Midwest Central Railroad

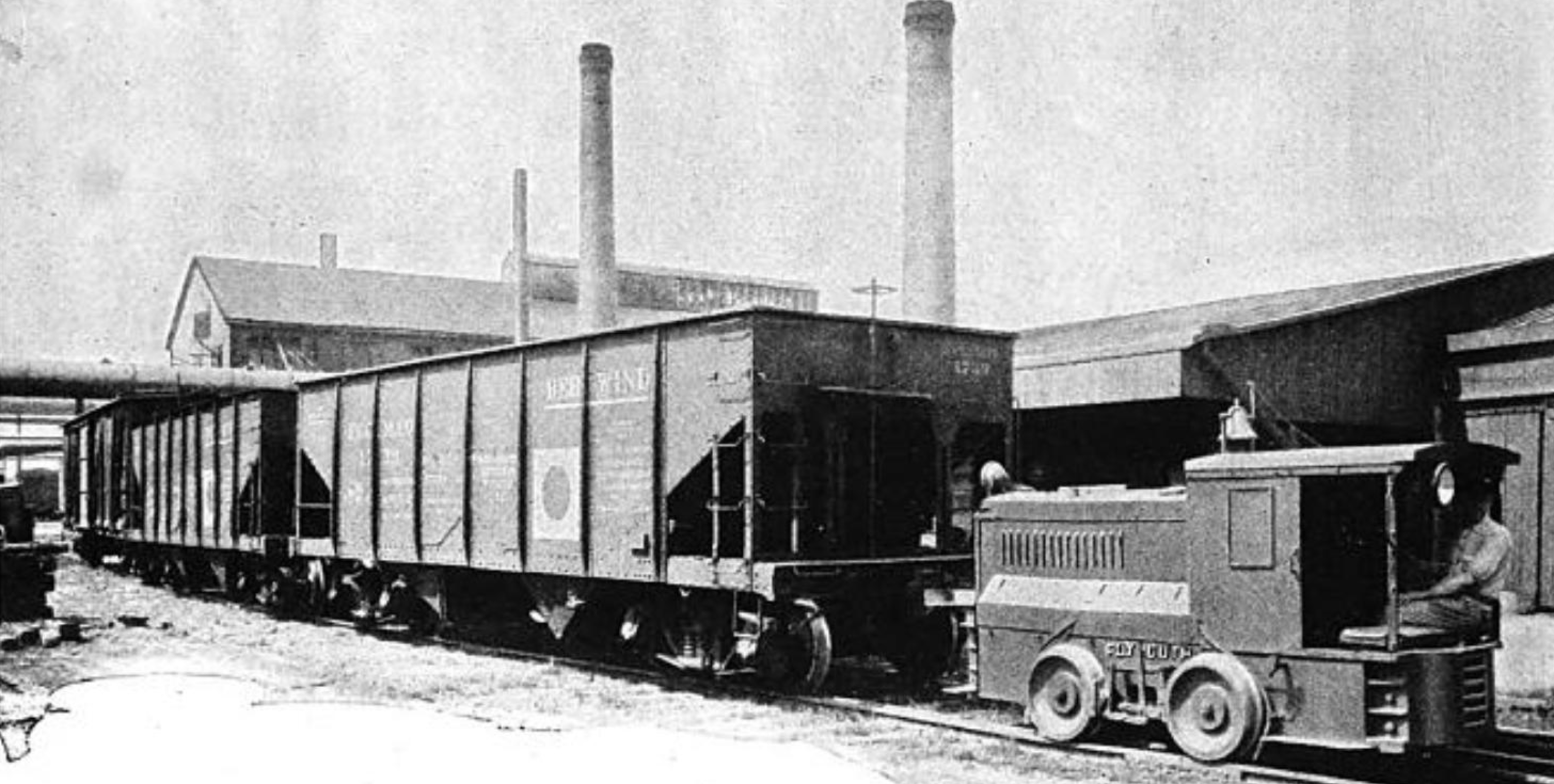
Standard gauge, 7-ton Plymouth switcher at Whitall Tatum

Plymouth Locomotive Works was a US builder of small railroad locomotives. All Plymouth locomotives were built in a plant in Plymouth, Ohio until 1997 when the company was purchased by Ohio Locomotive Crane and production moved to Bucyrus, Ohio in 1999. Production of locomotives has ceased, and rights to the spare parts business have been sold to Williams Distribution.

== History ==
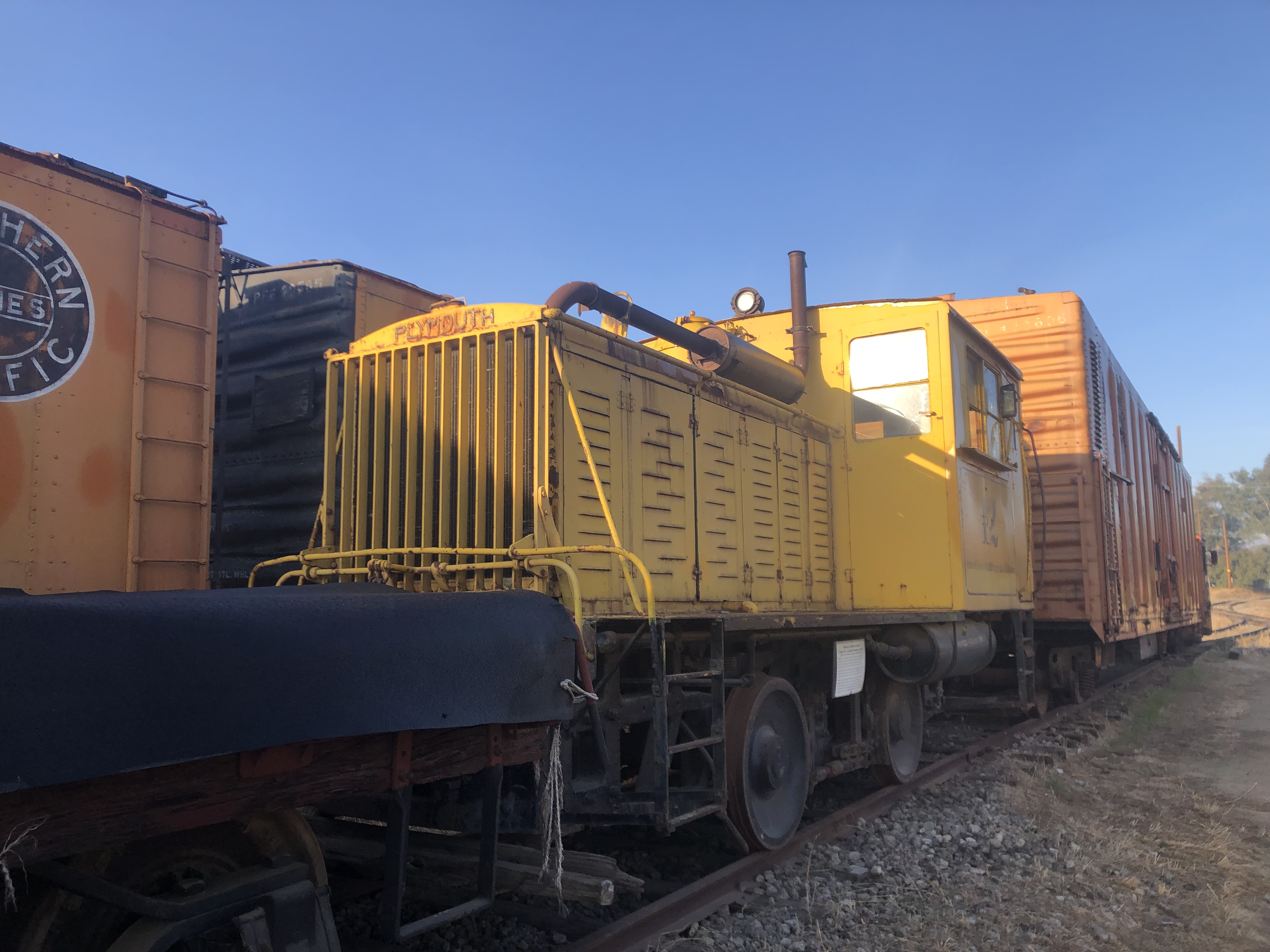
Southern California Edison Company #12, at the Southern California Railway Museum

Plymouth locomotives were first built in 1910 by the J. D. Fate Company, which became Fate-Root-Heath in 1919. The J.D. Fate patent application filed in 1917 shows the engine driving a clutch and a continuously variable transmission that allowed varying the speed through zero to reverse the locomotive. The output of the transmission drove a transverse jackshaft through a chain drive, with additional drive chains to the two driving axles. All early Plymouth locomotives used this drive scheme. The Fate-Root-Heath patent application filed in 1925 shows a far more conventional 4-speed transmission and reverse gears driving the jackshaft and final chain drive to the 2 driving axles.

All early Plymouth locomotives were powered by gasoline-burning internal combustion engines, but in 1927 the first diesel was produced. The company changed its name to match its locomotive plant in the late 1950s, becoming Plymouth Locomotive Works, changing again to Plymouth Industries in the late 1970s.

== Production ==
Plymouth was one of the world's most prolific builders of small industrial locomotives, with over 7,500 constructed. About 1,700 are believed to still be in active use, some over 50 years old. Almost all Plymouth locomotives were under 25 tons.

Early Plymouth gasoline-powered locomotives were built with Chrysler engines. (Chrysler's Plymouth automotive branding was unrelated.) In 1937, Plymouth constructed two prototype short-line railroad locomotives, one that ran on butane and another that ran on propane. Plymouth produced locomotives in most rail gauges, mostly with mechanical torque converter transmissions.

== See also ==
- Friction drive
- List of locomotive builders
- Plymouth CR-8 locomotives
