= Toby Tolliver =

Toby Tolliver was a character in the "Toby and Susie Show," a long-running act in early 20th-century American theatrical tent shows. Toby was largely a Midwest product. His prototype is found everywhere in America, but is most closely identified with the tall corn and cotton country. He has been called by some the most enduring theatrical figure in the American theatre. Toby Tolliver is a rube in the grand tradition. His hair is bright as a fire truck, and he usually wears overalls that are likely as not held up by one strap. He speaks a low brand of English, and many cultivated customs of society are beyond him. Underneath Toby's country appearance and unsophisticated manner, there runs deep currents of native wit, of cunning and resourcefulness. Unlike many rubes before him, Toby is True Blue. Sometimes he actually rises to the heroic, though invariably he makes it appear accidental. Toby is awkward, unlettered, boisterous, full of fun, with a great amount of common sense. He is the fellow in the play who says what the man in the audience wishes he could have thought of. Toby has been a show business character for a long time - some say since Shakespeare's "Twelfth Night" first hit the "boards". For thirty-eight years, Toby and his counterpart Susie were the chief asset for Neil and Caroline, the Schaffner Players. They made the characters nationally famous through their appearance in their tent theatre, as radio stars, as features in countless national magazines, and through network television appearances.
