= Schaffner Players =

Rural entertainment tent show

The Schaffner Players was a traveling theatre group that performed in the Midwest Opera Houses, in traveling tent shows, and later on the radio for 72 years.

The Schaffner Players trace their beginning back to 1851. That was the year when "Yankee" Robinson, the first man in America to tour a dramatic show under a tent, moved to Davenport, Iowa and nearby Rock Island, Illinois. Finding no buildings large enough in which his cast could perform, he built a 1000 seat tent theatre with his own hands, hired a cast and transported his touring company by horse drawn wagons and riverboats to Quincy, Illinois where they opened their season on May 29, 1851. Billed as "The Robinson Family" they toured Illinois, Missouri and Iowa where they closed their first season in Davenport On September 9–10, 1851.

"Yankee" Robinson operated his traveling tent repertoire theatre until the 1880s when Charles Emerson bought it and operated it until 1910. J.S. Angell, widely known in the show world, next acquired the show and named it Angell's Comedians. Neil Schaffner started working for Angell in 1922 and later acquired a half partnership. In 1925 Schaffner acquired full ownership and the show remained in his hands until he retired after a heart attack in 1962. Jimmy Davis who had worked for Schaffner as leading man, since the mid-1950s, purchased the tent theatre company and the Schaffner Players name. For over three decades Davis continued to operate the touring company as the Schaffner Players, starring Toby and Susie.

In 1851 only "Yankee" Robinson's company toured in their tented theatre. By 1927, The New York Times estimated that 400 tent theatre companies had visited 18,000 communities and played to 76,800,000 customers while 500 legitimate theatres across the U.S. had played to only 48,000,000 customers. That same year, Billboard Magazine proclaimed the dawn of "The Tent Show Era". Jimmy Davis proclaimed the same theory used by the late Neil Schaffner. "Give the theatre audience what it wants to see and the audience will never stop supporting the theatre".

The Schaffner Players, starring "Toby and Susie" (Toby Tolliver), continued to exist until the death of Davis in 1998.
