= Plymouth CR-8 locomotives =

Plymouth CR-8
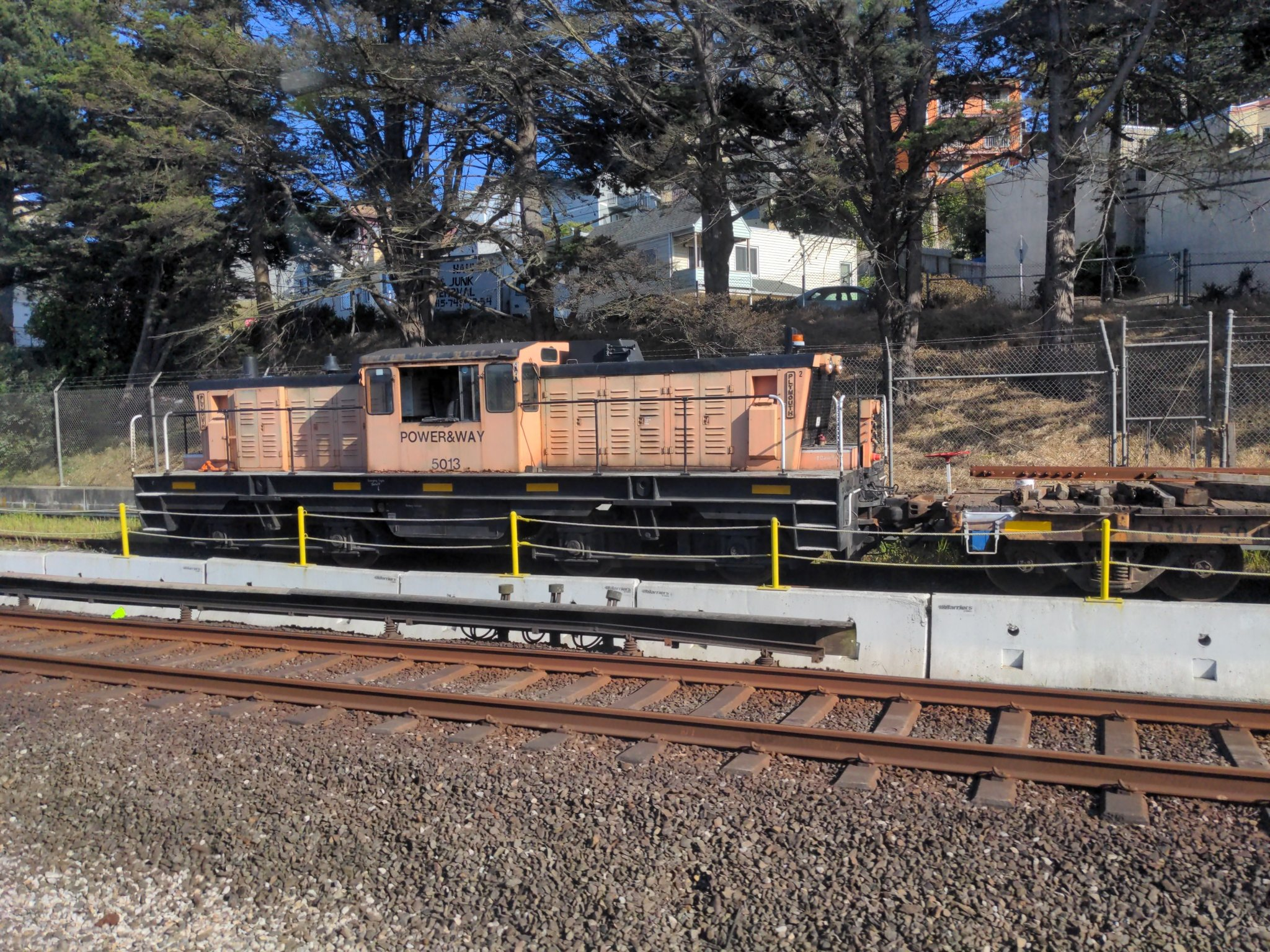
- Plymouth CR-8 centercab diesel locomotive of BART
Type and origin
- Power type: Diesel-hydraulic
- Builder: Plymouth
- Model: CR-8; CR-8XT (heavier variant)
- Build date: 1963-1990s By location: 1963-1990s (American industrial railroads); 1963/4 (Vietnamese units)* (Note: In 'Diesel and gas turbine progress, (1963), ten CR-8 locomotives were noted as having been delivered to the US Army (United States Army Aviation and Missile Command).); 1963 and 1964 (Ponce & Guayama Railroad units); 1971, 1979 (BART units); October 1987 (MBTA unit); c. 1994 (for Maryland Transit Administration); 1992-1993 (South Korean units)
- Total produced: At least 21
Specifications
- Gauge: 1,000 mm (3 ft 3 3/8 in) (in Vietnam and Puerto Rico); 1,435 mm (4 ft 8 1/2 in) (South Korea and most of the US); 1,676 mm (5 ft 6 in) (BART units)
- Length: 12.384 m (40.63 ft) over couplers
- Height: 3.556 m (11.67 ft)
- Loco weight: 52 t (51 long tons; 57 short tons)*; 45 to 65 short tons (40 to 58 long tons; 41 to 59 t)‡ (Note: Also quoted as being available in versions from 40 to 120 short tons (36 to 107 long tons; 36 to 109 metric tons).)
- Prime mover: two General Motors 12V7
- Engine type: two-stroke diesel
- Cylinders: V12
Performance figures
- Maximum speed: 80 km/h (50 mph)
- Power output: engine 500 hp (370 kW) @ 2,100 rpm
- Tractive effort: 155 kN (35,000 lb_{f})
Career
- Operators: Bay Area Rapid Transit; Massachusetts Bay Transportation Authority; Maryland Transit Administration; Ponce and Guayama Railroad (Puerto Rico); Various industrial railroads in the US; Sungshin Cement Manufacturing Company (in South Korea); In Thailand/Vietnam: Royal State Railways of Siam (RSR); US Army (Vietnam); Vietnam Railways (VR)
- Numbers: BART units: 5000, 5013; MBTA unit: 04443; MTA unit: 801; Sungshin Cement Co.: 6-7; Ponce & Guayama Railroad units: 40-42; In Thailand/Vietnam: RSR: 2001-10; US Army : 1988-1997 (Note: Some units renumbered to within range 1001 to 1010. Not all units received numbers in range 31 to 40.); VR: D10H 31 to D10H 40
- Locale: United States; Baltimore (MTA 801); Boston (MBTA 0443); San Francisco Bay Area (BART units); Puerto Rico (Ponce & Guayama Railroad); Various industrial railroads; Thailand (1960s); Vietnam (1960s-1980s); North Chungcheong Province, South Korea (1992-present)
- Withdrawn: c. 1985 (in Vietnam); Early 1990s (Puerto Rico)
- Disposition: Disposition, by operator: Vietnamese units: presumed scrapped; BART units: used for maintenance of way (MOW) trains; MBTA 04443: used on Red Line MOW trains; MTA 801: used on Baltimore Metro SubwayLink (formerly light rail); South Korean units: in service.; Ponce & Guayama Railroad units: presumed scrapped
- Sources: *Data refers to Vietnamese locos unless noted. (Note: USA operated units varied from the specifications of the units used in Vietnam.) ‡ General data

The Plymouth CR-8 was a class of 4-axle B'B' centre cab locomotive, built by Plymouth Locomotive Works in the United States, several of which were used on industrial sites.

Ten units (CR-8b) were briefly operated in Thailand in the mid-1960s. During the Vietnam War they were operated by the US Army in South Vietnam, and afterward became entered Vietnam Railways service as class D10H. A second class of Chinese-built locomotives, classed DFH21, have operated as D10H in Vietnam from around 1980 onwards.

== History and design ==
The CR-8 class was available in weights from 45 to 65 short tons (40 to 58 long tons; 41 to 59 metric tons), with installed power ranging from 400 to 1,000 horsepower (300 to 750 kW) using hydraulic twin engines via a cardan shaft final drive, in gauges from 3 ft (914 mm) to 5 ft 6 in (1,676 mm).

The 1,000 mm (3 ft 3 3/8 in) gauge American locomotives used in Vietnam used two General Motors 12V71 two stroke V12 engines.

The locomotives were originally thought to have been operated on the Royal State Railways of Siam (RSR) as numbers 2001-2010 beginning in 1963 or 1964. They were transferred to South Vietnam in the late 1960s during the US involvement in the Vietnam War, and operated as numbers 1988 to 1997 by the US Army. After the war's end in 1975 they were reclassified D10H and renumbered 31 to 40 by Vietnam Railways.

Several similar locomotives were used in the US by industrial operators, as well as MBTA and BART. A heavier model, the CR-8XT, (Note: The CR-8XT was available in 70 to 120 short tons (63 to 107 long tons; 64 to 109 metric tons).) was used by companies including Bethlehem Steel and the Jones and Laughlin Steel Company.

== Known owners ==
Owner	Variant	Qty.	Numbers	Notes
State Railway of Thailand	CR-8	10	2001-2010	Metre gauge; later to US Army as 1988-1997; later used by Vietnam Railways as class D10 locomotives 31-40; presumed scrapped.
Bay Area Rapid Transit	CR-8	2	5000, 5013	Built to 5 ft 6 in (1,676 mm) gauge; 5000 originally built in 1971 as L-1, and 5013 built in 1979; in service on maintenance-of-way trains.
Massachusetts Bay Transportation Authority	CR-8	1	04443	In use for maintenance-of-way trains on the Red Line of the MBTA subway.
Maryland Transit Administration	CR-8	1	801	Formerly used to tow broken-down light rail vehicles the Baltimore Light RailLink, now used on the Baltimore Metro SubwayLink.
Martin-Marietta	CR-8	1	47-0050	Built in 1981 (serial number 7347) and formerly used in Woodville, Ohio; now owned by Stoneco and numbered 40.0001.
Kaiser Sand and Gravel	CR-8	1	3707	Built 1969 for various industrial operations in California, including in Radum and the Permanente Quarry.
Ponce & Guayama Railroad		3	40-42	Meter gauge; #40 was built in 1963 (serial number 6199) and #41 - #42 were built in 1964 (serial numbers 6420 and 6421) for use on this sugar railroad in Puerto Rico. They operated on the railroad until its closure in 1990. All weighed 45 tons
Jones & Laughlin Steel	CR-8XT	2	37-38	37 built in 1967, and 38 built in 1975. Used in Aliquippa, PA. 37 later sold to LTV Steel.
Bethlehem Steel	CR-8XT	1	71	Built 1963 for use in Bethlehem, Pennsylvania, later renumbered 30 for use in Lackawanna, New York.
Sungshin Cement	CR-8XT	2	6, 7	Built in 1992 and 1993 for use on an industrial railroad in North Chungcheong Province, South Korea; used to haul cement and coal to Korail's Dodam junction
