= Grand View University =

Private liberal arts university in Des Moines, Iowa, U.S.

- Former names: Grand View College and Seminary (1896–1924); Grand View Junior College (1924–1975); Grand View College (1975–2008)
- Type: Private liberal arts university
- Established: 1896; 130 years ago
- Religious affiliation: Evangelical Lutheran Church in America
- Academic affiliations: NAICU, CIC
- Endowment: $39.9 million (2025)
- President: Rachelle Keck
- Provost: Patty Williams
- Faculty: 90
- Students: 1,886 (Spring 2020)
- Undergraduates: 1,761 (Spring 2020)
- Postgraduates: 125 (Spring 2020)
- Location: Des Moines, Iowa, United States; 41.620546°N 93.604279°W
- Campus: Urban
- Colors: Red & White
- Nickname: Vikings
- Sporting affiliations: NAIA – HAAC; NACE
- Mascot: Viktor the Viking
- Website: www.grandview.edu

Grand View University is a private liberal arts university in Des Moines, Iowa, United States. Founded in 1896 and affiliated with the Evangelical Lutheran Church in America, the university enrolls approximately 2,000 students and is accredited by the Higher Learning Commission.

== History ==
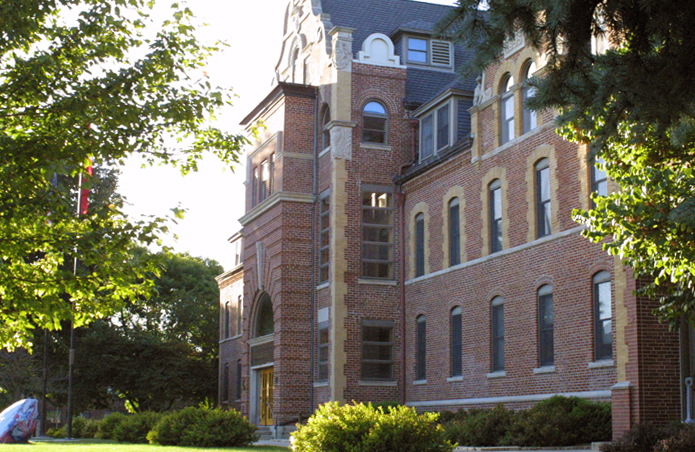
The Humphrey Center is the oldest building at Grand View and houses the university's administration.

Grand View College and Seminary was started in 1896 by members of the Danish Evangelical Lutheran Church in America. In 1912, Grand View opened a high school academy department. Instruction at the junior college level began in 1924 and accreditation by the Iowa State Department of Public Instruction came in 1938 following the dissolution of the academy. It gained accreditation by the North Central Association of Colleges and Secondary Schools in 1959. In 1968, the school's theological seminary was relocated to Maywood, Illinois.

In 1975, nursing programs were added along with baccalaureate programs, and the school, which had been called Grand View Junior College, dropped the "junior" from its name to become Grand View College. In 2008, after adding graduate programs, the college renamed itself Grand View University.

The Grand View Danish Immigrant Archives houses a wide variety of information sources related to the Danish immigrant influence on the United States, including personal histories, photographs, writings, and a large collection of Danish American newspapers and magazines.

== Campus ==
Grand View's 50-acre campus is located in the Union Park Neighborhood of Des Moines, Iowa, just northeast of downtown. Over 800 students live on campus in six different residential facilities. Notable landmarks include the Humphrey Center—built in 1895 in the style of Danish Renaissance architecture—and a 159-foot long skywalk across U.S. Route 69 in the heart of campus.

=== Major buildings ===
Old Main (now the Humphrey Center) circa 1900.

Humphrey Center – Formerly Old Main, the Humphrey Center is the oldest building on campus, built in 1896. The offices of Admissions, Business, Financial Aid, Registrar, President, Provost and Vice President for Academic Affairs, Vice President for Finance and Administration, and Vice President for Advancement are all located here. Humphrey is on the National Register of Historic Places, and was built in three different phases (1895, 1898, 1904). The facility underwent a complete renovation in 1998 and was named in recognition of alumnus Alice (Olson) Humphrey. The college's maintenance division is based out of a garage directly north of the building.

Charles S. Johnson Wellness Center – Located at 1500 Morton Avenue, the 92,000-square-foot facility houses the nursing and kinesiology departments, recreational and athletic facilities, a community clinic, classrooms and faculty offices. The field house contains weight lifting equipment, a 1/10 mile track, and a double basketball court. Sisam Arena was renovated in 2002, while the wellness center was being constructed, and put in new bleachers, backboards, wall padding and a small media platform. The lobby of the arena showcases trophy cases featuring the Grand View Athletic Hall of Fame. Sisam Arena was named after David Sisam, longtime coach and athletic director. In 2008, a new two-level addition was added on the southeast corner bringing a new weight room, wrestling room and athletics staff offices.

Cowles Center – Located at 1331 Grandview Avenue, Cowles houses the Music Department with rehearsal spaces for band and choir teaching studios, mixed use practice room, and study space for students.

Krumm Business Center – Located at 1330 Morton Avenue, and named after college benefactor and former Maytag CEO Daniel J. Krumm, this academic building houses general-purpose classrooms, a large lecture hall, computer lab, and faculty/staff offices. The university's information technology department is based out of the Krumm Center.

Library – Located at the corner of Morton Avenue and East 14th Street (U.S. Route 69), the two-story library was completed in 1968 with an addition added in 1992. The first floor contains a teaching classroom/computer lab, the reference collection, current periodicals and journals, the children's and young adult collection, private study rooms, study tables, DVD and video viewing rooms, the information desk, and the bank of research computers. The library's collection of books and journals as well as study tables are located on the second floor, along with the Danish Immigrant Archives. The library is also home to an Einstein Bros Bagels.

Rasmussen Center for Community Advancement Professions – located at 2800 East 14th Street U.S. Route 69), north of the library., the Rasmussen Center opened in fall 2008 and houses the departments of art, education, history, criminal justice, political studies, psychology and sociology, as well as general-purpose classrooms, art studios, computer labs, the ALT Center, faculty offices, and various student amenities. The building is named after Jim and Sandra Rasmussen, long-time supporters of Grand View who contributed $3 million to the building campaign.

The Kent L. Henning Student Center – Located at 2811 East 14th Street (U.S. Route 69), the Student Center was renovated and expanded in 2015 to accommodate the communication and theater departments, student dining, academic and career success centers, the bookstore, the Viking Theatre, student services and recreation, plus the Robert Speed Lyceum, a large multipurpose performance area.

== Academics ==
Grand View offers 40+ undergraduate majors and four master's degree programs. Its nine pre-professional programs include medicine, law, pharmacy, and physical therapy.

== Athletics ==
The Grand View athletic teams are called the Vikings. The university is a member of the National Association of Intercollegiate Athletics (NAIA), primarily competing in the Heart of America Athletic Conference (HAAC) since the 2015–16 academic year. The Vikings previously competed in the defunct Midwest Collegiate Conference (MCC) from 1989–90 to 2014–15 (when the conference dissolved).

Grand View competes in 25 intercollegiate varsity sports: Men's sports include baseball, basketball, bowling, cross country, football, golf, soccer, tennis, track & field, volleyball and wrestling; while women's sports include basketball, bowling, competitive dance, cross country, golf, soccer, softball, tennis, track & field, volleyball and wrestling; and co-ed sports include cheerleading, eSports (which was established in the fall of 2017) and shooting sports. The squads are supported by the athletic department.

=== Accomplishments ===
- The Vikings men's wrestling won the NAIA Men's Wrestling Championship nine consecutive times from 2012 to 2020, and three consecutive times from 2022 to 2024.
- The Vikings football team won the NAIA Football National Championship in 2013, 2024, and 2025.
- The Vikings men's golf team won the NAIA Men's Golf Championship in 2017.
- The Vikings men's volleyball team won the NAIA Men's Volleyball National Championship in 2021 and 2022.

=== Esports ===
Grand View University began competing in esports the fall of 2017 becoming the first higher education institute in Iowa to introduce a varsity program as well as offer esports scholarships. Grand View is a member of the National Association of Collegiate Esports. Grand View's esports gaming arena is located in the basement of Nielsen Hall dormitory.

Hired in 2018 as Grand View's director of esports, Dana Hustedt became the first female collegiate esports director in the United States.

== Student life ==
Approximately 84% of Grand View students are from Iowa while 14% are from other elsewhere in the United States. International students make up 2% of the student population. Grand View University has more than 40 campus clubs and organizations that represent a variety of interests.

=== Student government ===
Viking Council is the governing body of Grand View students. It is composed of officers elected by the student body and a representative group of student senators. Viking Council is responsible for expenditure of student activity fees. Student Activities Council (SAC) is funded by and reports to the Viking Council. This board develops and schedules campus-wide programs and activities throughout the school year to meet the diverse needs of the student population. Residential Experience Council (REC) members are active in hall government, which speaks to policies and matters of concern to all campus residents.

=== Traditions ===
Bud the Bird

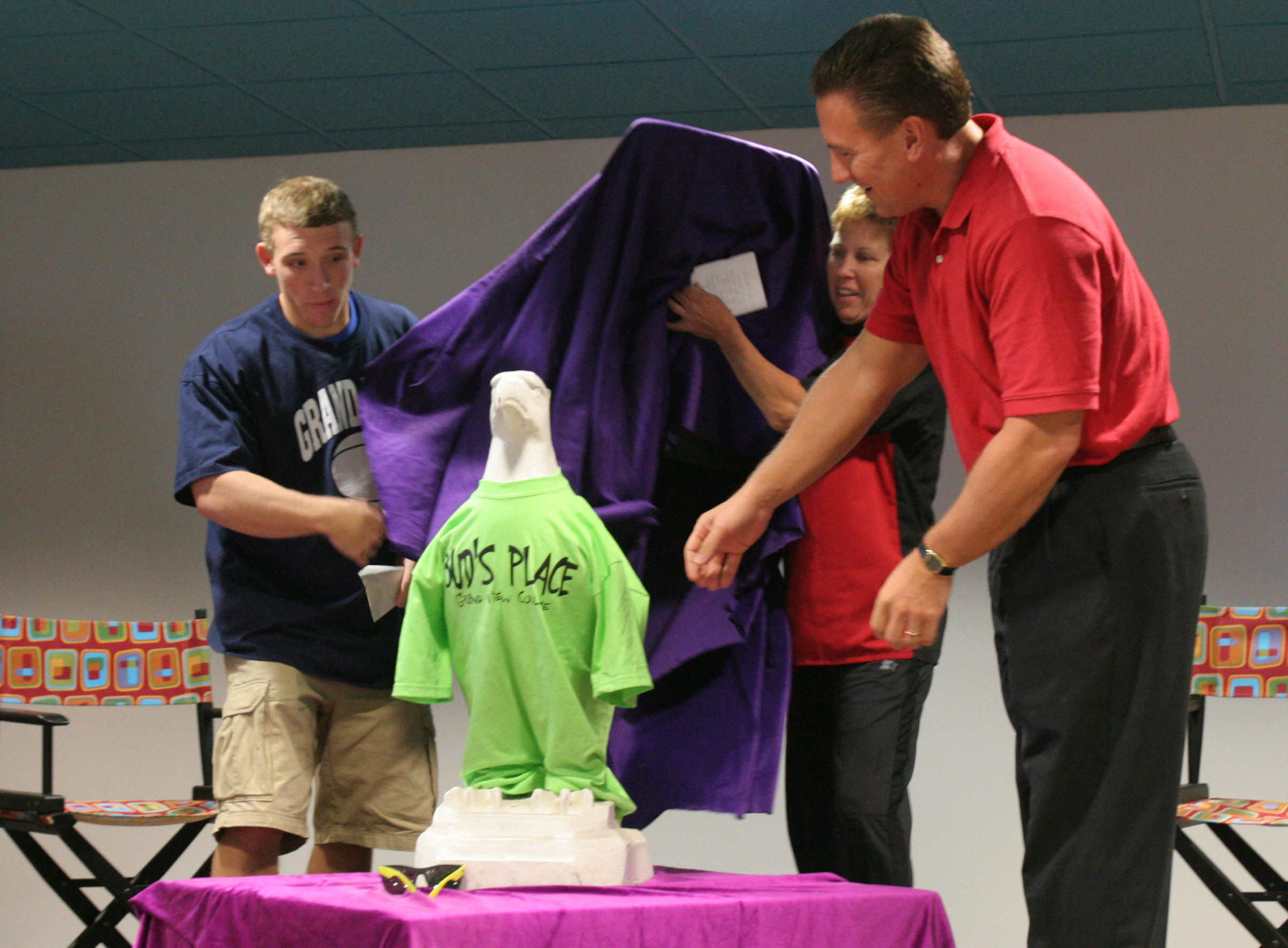
Bud Jr. is unveiled by staff at the dedication ceremony of Bud's Place on October 1, 2005.

Since the 1930s Grand View students have participated in a campus tradition using "Bud the Bird," a large eagle statue, as the object of desire in the school's own version of "capture the flag."

The first reports of this tradition date back to 1933, where rumor has it, a large iron eagle decoration was stolen from a nearby business. Students named this statue "Bud the Bird," and over the years it was hidden and relocated on campus by different student groups. This first Bud would later be donated during World War II as scrap metal by college president, Alfred C. Nielsen, to support the war effort. The first Bud was replaced by Bud Jr., a 33-inch 200-pound replica. Sometime in the late 1940s, Bud Jr. was buried on the west end of campus, not to be unearthed again until over 50 years later in 1994 when maintenance crews were digging for fiber optic cables.

Over the years multiple Buds have been created, hidden and lost as students have competed for the honor of finding and hiding the statue.

The Rock
“The Rock,” located in front of the Humphrey Center is one of the most prominent traditions of Grand View. When re-sodding the lawn of what was then Old Main (now Humphrey Center), students in the 1900s placed the rock on the lawn directly in front of Old Main's entrance. The only significant change made to the landmark was in 1915 when it was moved to make room for a new sidewalk to the entrance.

Students traditionally paint the rock in the darkness of the night whenever students feel the urge to express themselves. "In times of celebration, sorrow, or protest, The Rock is deemed a medium of the students," a former Grand View student handbook stated. The rock is often used to announce campus events, and on at least one occasion, has been used to propose marriage.

== Notable alumni ==
- Molly Bolin, professional basketball player
- B. J. Hill, former head men's basketball coach at the University of Northern Colorado
- Kelley Johnson, beauty pageant titleholder
- Danny Neville, men's basketball coach at the University of Jamestown
- Clark R. Rasmussen, Iowa state representative
- Slick Watts, professional basketball player
- Brad Zaun, Iowa State Senator

== See also ==
- Viewfinder - campus media
- Grand View Vikings - campus athletics
- Benedict Nordentoft - president (1903–1910)
