= Albert Moore Barrett =

American physician (1871–1936)

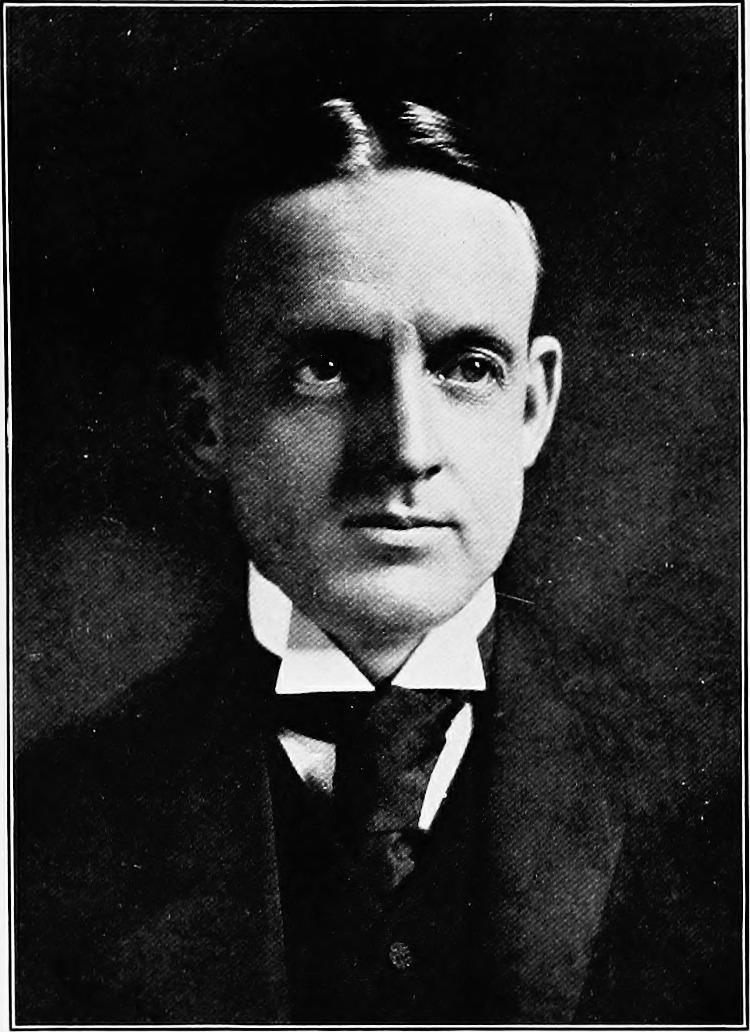
- Born: July 15, 1871; Austin, Illinois, United States
- Died: April 2, 1936 (aged 64); Ann Arbor, Michigan
- Resting place: Forest Hill Cemetery, Ann Arbor, Michigan
- Education: University of Iowa, BA (1893) and MD (1895), University of Heidelberg
- Scientific career
- Fields: Neuropathology, Psychiatry
- Workplaces: Iowa State Hospital for the Insane, Danvers Insane Hospital, Harvard Medical School, University of Michigan, Michigan State Asylums for the Insane

Albert Moore Barrett, M.D. (1871-1936), an American physician, was professor of psychiatry at the University of Michigan, and credited with the establishment of the first psychiatric hospital within a university.

== Early life and education ==
Barrett was born July 15, 1871, in Austin, Illinois, the son of a Methodist minister. He attended the State University of Iowa, earning a Bachelor of Arts (A.B.) in 1893 and a medical degree (M.D.) in 1895.

== Neuropathology training ==
Following graduation, from 1895 to 1897 he served as pathologist and assistant physician at the Iowa State Hospital for the Insane in Independence. Before reporting for duty, he worked under Adolph Meyer, M.D., the neuropathologist, at the Illinois Eastern Hospital for the Insane in Kankakee, Illinois. According to Meyer, Barrett was interested in learning how to conduct autopsies and to study the human brain. In 1897, Barrett moved to the State Mental Hospital in Worcester, Massachusetts as an assistant physician. In 1901-1902, Barrett studied at the University of Heidelberg in Germany, working with Franz Nissl, Alois Alzheimer, and Emil Kraepelin. Upon his return to the United States, he was appointed assistant physician and pathologist at the Danvers State Hospital (also known as the State Lunatic Hospital at Danvers and State Insane Asylum) in Massachusetts, and in 1905-1906 was assistant professor in neuropathology at the Harvard Medical School.

== Career at the University of Michigan ==
In 1906, he was invited to join the University of Michigan Medical School. William J. Henderson, M.D, the professor of nervous and mental diseases, was planning to open a small psychiatric hospital to be part of both the university and the state mental health system. The new State Psychopathic Hospital was to provide care of patients, and for the study and research in neuropathology of mental illness. The Michigan state legislature authorized the facility in 1905, and it was opened in 1906 with Barrett as the director.

Barrett was part of a movement in the treatment of mentally ill people which viewed mental illnesses as potentially treatable problems, and which discouraged incarcerating the mentally ill in asylums or penal institutions if at all possible. His work as director of the State Psychopathic Hospital in Ann Arbor was path-breaking in several respects, particularly in the treatment of less severe cases on an outpatient or short-term basis. Barrett saw his model of a psychopathic hospital as a supplement to the existing system of state hospitals for the insane, and believed that a system of mental health centers affiliated with local hospitals would be more effective than the existing, highly centralized, arrangements in each state; it would allow for cooperation with local courts and welfare agencies, and would let patients remain close to home whenever possible.

Barrett was named professor of nervous and mental diseases in 1907. He stayed in his post until 1920 when nervous diseases became a separate department. He was considered a successful teacher and some of his students became leaders in American psychiatry. His career in developing a full-fledged university clinic associated with both a university and state mental hospital system led the way for similar institutions to be established in other states. During World War I, he trained the Medical Corps officers in psychiatry.

He died of cardiac disease on April 2, 1936.

== Honors and professional affiliations ==
Barrett was active in medical organizations. He was President of the American Psychiatric Association from 1921 to 1922. In 1936, he was elected President of the American Neurological Association, but he died shortly before assuming the office. He was President of the Central Neuropsychiatric Association, and the Detroit Neurological Society. He served on the Editorial Boards of the Archives of Neurology and Psychiatry, and the American Journal of Psychiatry.

== Works ==
- Barrett, Albert. “A Study of Mental Diseases Associated with Cerebral Arteriosclerosis,” American Journal of Psychiatry 62(1) (1905): 37, 62-65.
- Barrett, Albert. “A Study of Certain Types of Mental Disorders and Peculiar Cerebral Lesions Observed in Cases of Pernicious Anemia,” The Physician and Surgeon 35 (1913): 356-358.
- Barrett, Albert. “A Case of Alzheimer’s Disease with Unusual Neurological Disturbances,” Journal of Nervous and Mental Disease 40(6) (June 1913): 361-374.
- Barrett, Albert. “The Psychopathic Personality,” The Medical Clinics of North America 7 (1922-1923): 1165-1177.
- Meyer, Adolf. “In Memoriam,” American Journal of Psychiatry 93(2) (Sept. 1936): 499-500.
