= Kirkbride Plan =

Mental asylum design created by Thomas Kirkbride

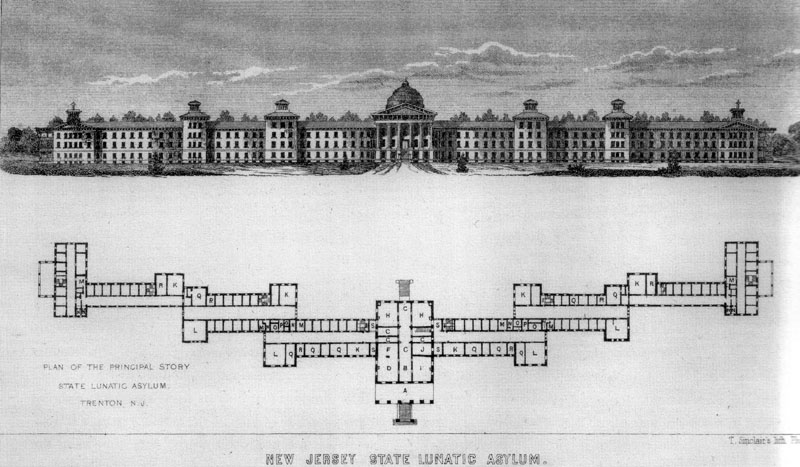
An 1848 lithograph of the Kirkbride design of Trenton State Hospital in Trenton, New Jersey

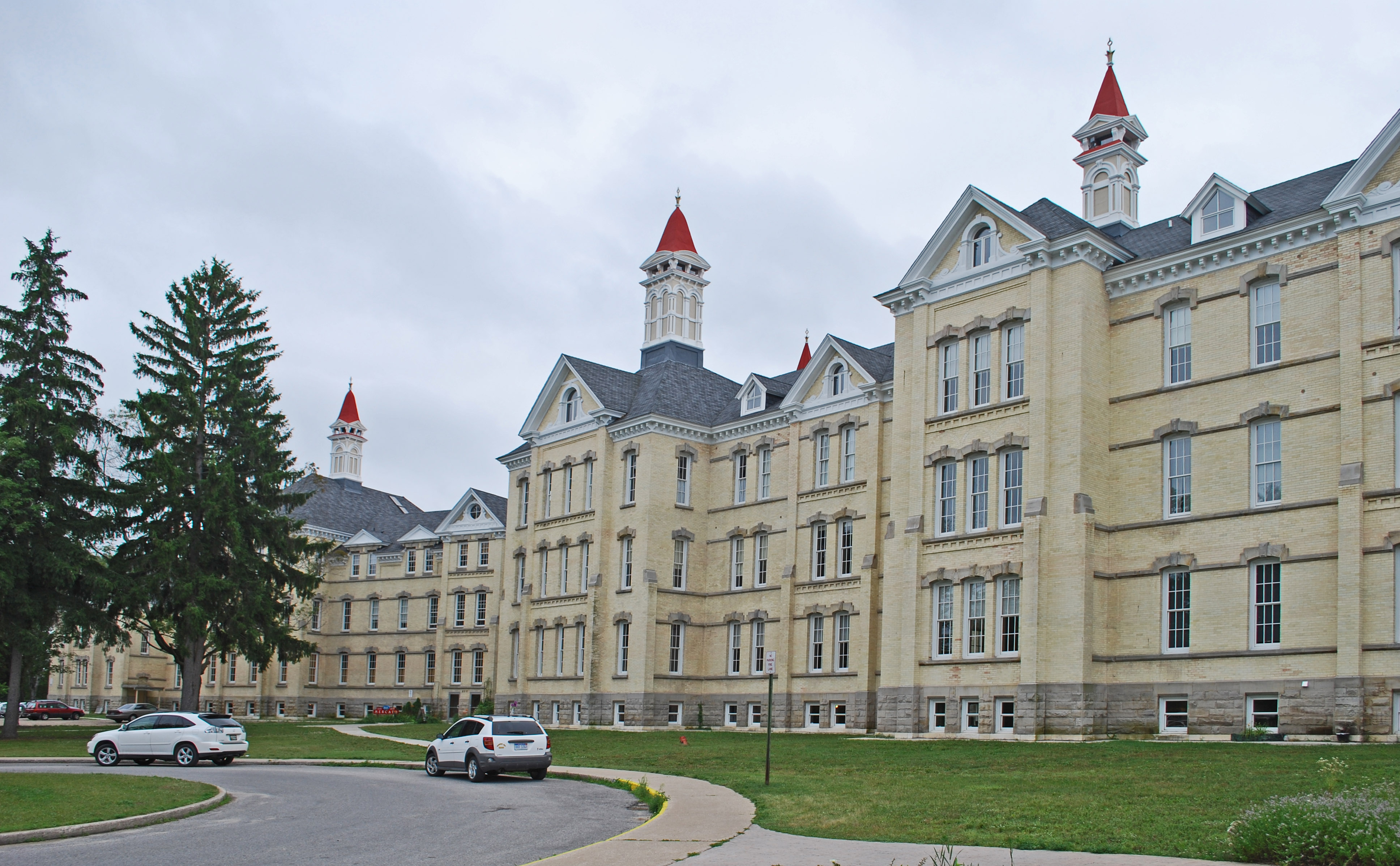
The Traverse City State Hospital in Michigan, in operation from 1881 to 1989, is an example of a Kirkbride building

The Kirkbride Plan was a system of mental asylum design advocated by American psychiatrist Thomas Story Kirkbride (1809–1883) in the mid-19th century. The asylums built in the Kirkbride design, often referred to as Kirkbride Buildings (or simply Kirkbrides), were constructed during the mid- to late 19th century in the United States.

The structural features of the hospitals as designated by Kirkbride were contingent on his theories regarding the healing of the mentally ill, in which environment and exposure to natural light and air circulation were crucial. The hospitals built according to the Kirkbride Plan would adopt various architectural styles, but had in common the "bat wing"-style floor plan, housing numerous wings that sprawl outward from the center.

The first hospital designed under the Kirkbride Plan was the Trenton State Hospital in Trenton, New Jersey, by John Notman, constructed in 1848. Throughout the remainder of the 19th century, numerous psychiatric hospitals were designed under the Kirkbride Plan across the United States. By the 20th century, popularity of the design had waned, largely due to the economic pressures of maintaining the immense facilities, as well as contestation of Kirkbride's theories among the medical community. Numerous Kirkbride structures still exist, though many have been partially demolished and repurposed or completely demolished.

At least 30 of the original Kirkbride buildings have been registered with the National Register of Historic Places in the United States, either directly or through their location on hospital campuses or in historic districts.

== History ==
=== Basis and philosophy ===
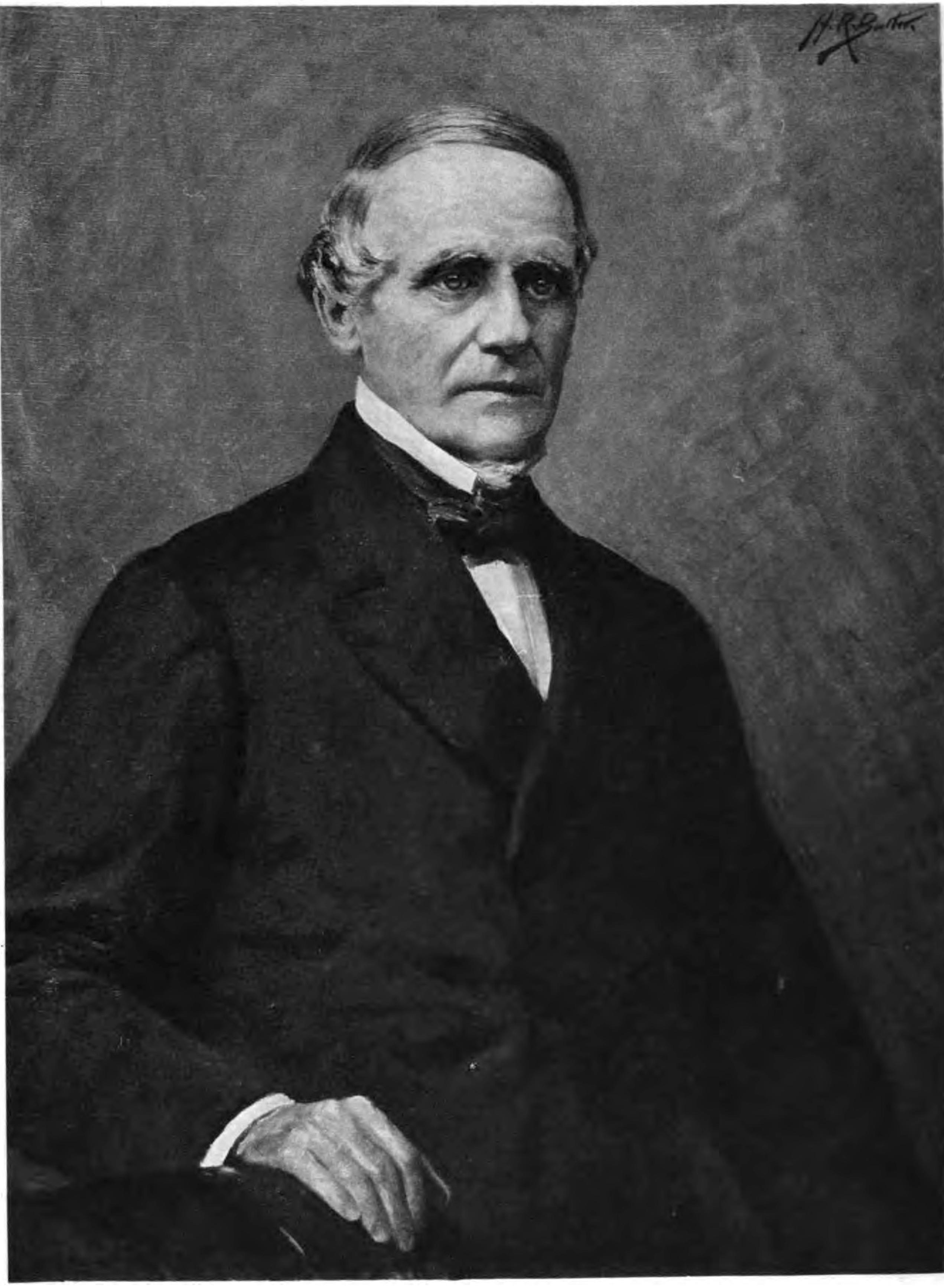
Thomas Story Kirkbride, creator of the Kirkbride Plan

The establishment of state mental hospitals in the U.S. is partly due to reformer Dorothea Dix, who testified to the New Jersey legislature in 1844, vividly describing the state's treatment of lunatics; they were being housed in county jails, private homes, and the basements of public buildings. Dix's effort led to the construction of the New Jersey State Lunatic Asylum, the first complete asylum built on the Kirkbride Plan.

Thomas Story Kirkbride (1809–1883), a psychiatrist from Philadelphia, Pennsylvania, developed his requirements of asylum design based on a philosophy of Moral Treatment and environmental determinism. The typical floor plan, with long, rambling wings arranged en echelon, staggered, so each connected wing received sunlight and fresh air, was meant to promote privacy and comfort for patients. The building form itself was meant to have a curative effect, "a special apparatus for the care of lunacy, [whose grounds should be] highly improved and tastefully ornamented." The idea of institutionalization was thus central to Kirkbride's plan for effectively treating the insane.

=== Design and architectural features ===
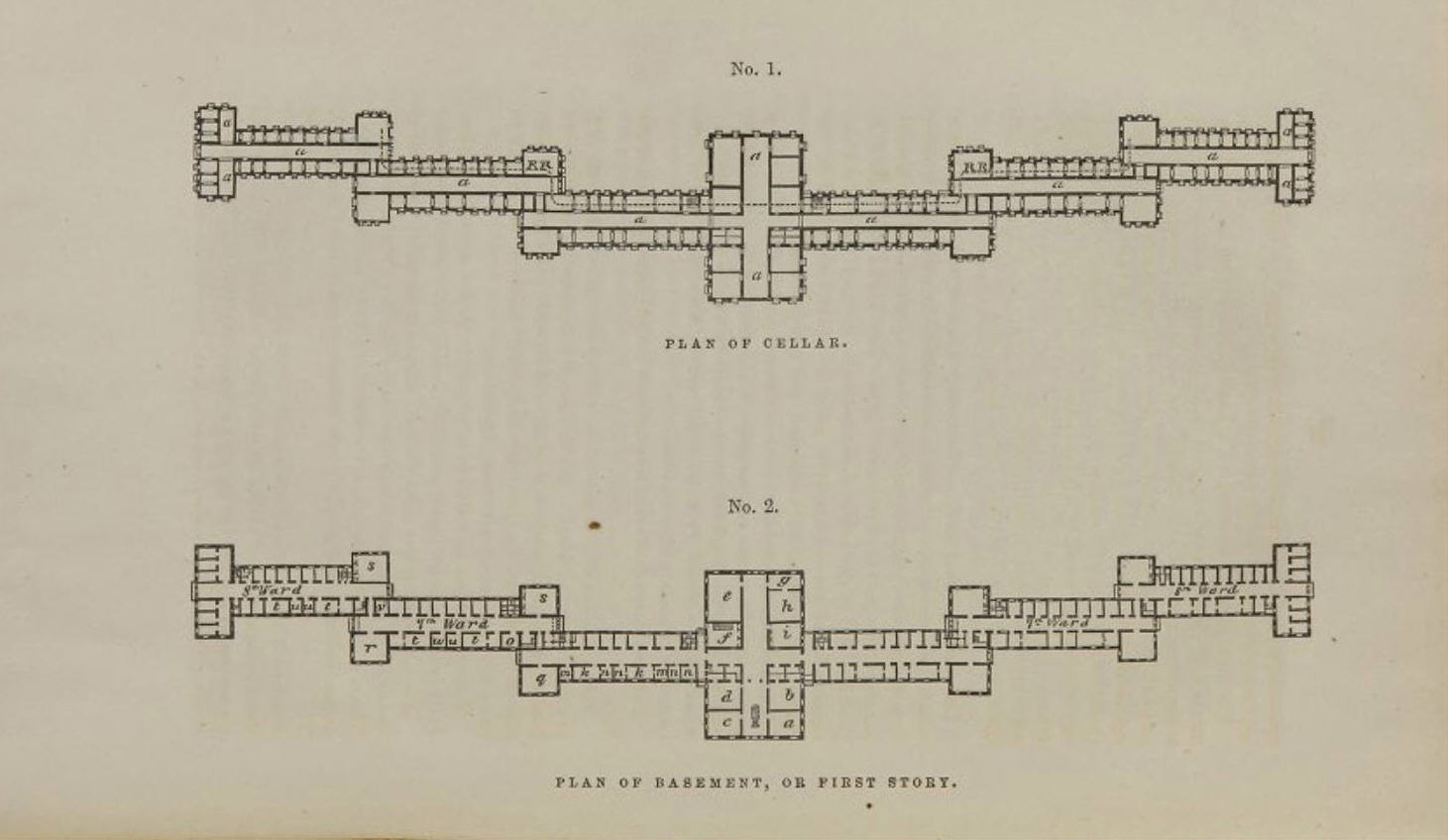
The floor plan for the Kirkbride design from an 1854 lithograph

The Kirkbride Plan asylums tended to be large, imposing institutional buildings, with the defining feature being their "narrow, stepped, linear building footprint" featuring staggered wings extending outward from the center, resembling the wingspan of a bat. The standard number of wings for a Kirkbride Plan hospital was eight, with an accommodation of 250 patients. Kirkbride's philosophy behind the staggered wings was to allow individual corridors open to sunlight and air ventilation through both ends, which he believed aided in healing the mentally ill.

Each wing, according to Kirkbride's original guidelines, would house a separate ward, which would contain its own "comfortably furnished" parlor, bathroom, clothes room, and infirmary, as well as a speaking tube and dumbwaiter to allow open communication and movement of materials between floors. The wings furthest from the center complex of the building were reserved for the "most excitable" or most physically dangerous and volatile patients.

Patient rooms were suggested to be spacious, with ceilings "at least 12 feet (3.7 m) high", but only large enough to room a single person. The center complexes of the Kirkbride Plan buildings were designed to house administration, kitchens, public and reception areas, and apartments for the superintendent's family. Architectural styles of Kirkbride Plan buildings varied depending on the appointed architect, and ranged from Richardsonian Romanesque to Neo-Gothic.

In addition to the intricate building design, Kirkbride also advocated the importance of "fertile" and spacious landscapes on which the hospitals would be built, with views that "if possible, should exhibit life in its active forms." Kirkbride also suggested the hospital grounds be a minimum of 100 acres (40 ha) in size. The foliage and farmlands on the hospital grounds were sometimes maintained by patients as part of physical exercise and/or therapy. Over the course of the 19th and 20th centuries, the campuses of these hospitals often evolved into sprawling, expansive grounds with numerous buildings.

=== Operations and staffing ===
Salaries per annum (1854)
Position	Compensation (USD)
Physician-in-chief	$1,500–2,500
Assisting physicians	$300–$500 + board
Steward	$500
Supervisors	$175–250
Engineer	$240
Carpenter	$240
Teachers	$175–200
Carriage driver	$168
Farmers & gardeners	$144–200
Attendants	$108–168
Cooks & bakers	$100–150
Nightwatchmen	$108
Seamstresses	$96

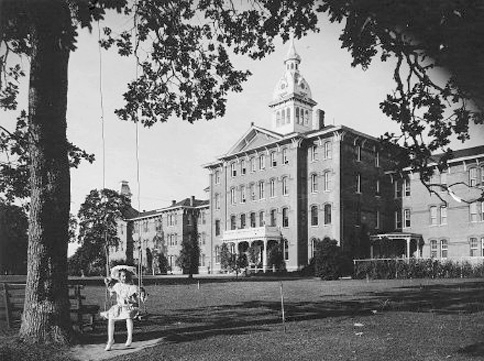
A child, ostensibly of the physician-in-chief, swinging on the lawn of the Oregon State Hospital, c. 1900

In his proposal, Kirkbride outlined specific guidelines as to how a Kirkbride Plan hospital should be staffed and operate on a daily basis. Kirkbride suggested a total of 71, all of whom were required to live within or in the immediate vicinity of the hospital. The superintending physician, or physician-in-chief, was required to live in the main hospital or in a building contiguous to it, while his family had the option of residing at the hospital or seeking private lodging. The staff was also to have a balanced sex distribution, with about 36 female and 35 male staff members.

Among the staff of a Kirkbride Plan hospital were the superintending physician, an assisting physician, nurses, supervisors and teachers of each sex, a chaplain, matron, and a nightwatchman. Kirkbride urged that at least two attendants be working in each ward at any given time and stressed the importance of the superintendent's "proper selection" of attendants, given the extent of their management responsibilities: "The duties of attendants, when faithfully performed, are often harassing, and in many wards, among excited patients, are peculiarly so. On this account, pains should always be taken to give them a reasonable amount of relaxation, and their position should, in every respect, be made as comfortable as possible." For general labor at the hospital, he suggested that the able-minded patients help maintain the hospital grounds and assist in duties in their respective wards.

Kirkbride's estimation of the number of staff, as well as their respective compensations, was outlined in an 1854 publication on the Kirkbride Plan design. He proposed a living wage for all employees of the hospital, noting that "although in a few institutions, a liberal compensation is given, in many, the salaries are quite too low, and entirely inadequate to be depended on, to secure and retain the best kind of talent for the different positions. The services required about the insane, when faithfully performed, are peculiarly trying to the mental and physical powers of any individual, and ought to be liberally paid for."

Salary for the superintending physician according to the 1854 guideline was to be US$1,500 (equivalent to $53,750 in 2025) if the physician's family resided at the hospital, and $2,500 (equivalent to $89,583 in 2025) if they found lodging at a private residence. In addition to the medical staff and attendants, the Kirkbride Plan hospitals also employed laborers of various trades, including resident engineers, carpenters, cooks and dairymaids, gardeners, seamstresses, ironworkers, clothing launderers, and a carriage driver.

=== Decline and phasing out ===
By the late 19th century, the Kirkbride design had begun to wane in popularity, largely because the hospitals, which were state funded, had received significant budget cuts that rendered them difficult to maintain. General psychiatric and medical opinion of Kirkbride's theories regarding the "curability" of mental illness were also questioned by the medical community.

== Future ==
=== Status ===
Sites of current and former Kirkbride Hospitals in the United States
Surviving Kirkbride Plan buildings (either partial or complete) in the United States as of 2017 (Note: Based on research from KirkbrideBuildings.com as well as other cited external sources, there are at least 25 surviving Kirkbride Plan buildings in the United States.: Note: This does not reflect the current existence of active hospitals originally established under the Kirkbride Plan, only the survival of the original buildings.)

A total of 73 known Kirkbride Plan hospitals were constructed throughout the United States between 1845 and 1910. As of 2016, approximately 33 of these identified Kirkbride Plan hospital buildings still exist in their original form to some degree: (Note: Per the sourced table, many Kirkbride Plan hospitals still exist in some form (some as active hospitals), though the original Kirkbride structures have not been retained on many of the hospital campuses over the course of their evolution. Other hospitals have been closed down and demolished entirely, while some have been demolished in part and/or repurposed for various uses.) 24 have been preserved indicating that the building is still standing and still in use, at least, in part. 11 of the 24 preserved properties received secondary condition codes of deteriorating, vacant, partial demolition or a combination, while the remaining nine have been adaptively reused. Of the 40 hospital buildings that no longer exist, either via demolition or destruction from natural occurrences, such as earthquakes, 26 were demolished to be replaced with new facilities.

The highest concentrations of Kirkbride Plan hospitals were in the Northeast and Midwestern states. Fewer Kirkbride Plan hospitals were constructed on the West Coast: In California, the Napa State Hospital was a notable Kirkbride Plan hospital, though the original structure was severely damaged during the 1906 San Francisco earthquake, and was ultimately demolished.

The two surviving Kirkbride structures on the West Coast are both located in the state of Oregon, at the Oregon State Hospital, and the Eastern Oregon State Hospital, the latter of which now houses the Eastern Oregon Correctional Institution. While the vast majority of Kirkbride hospitals were located in the United States, similar facilities were built in Canada, and the Callan Park Hospital for the Insane in Sydney, Australia (constructed in 1885) was also influenced by Kirkbride's design.

=== Preservation efforts ===
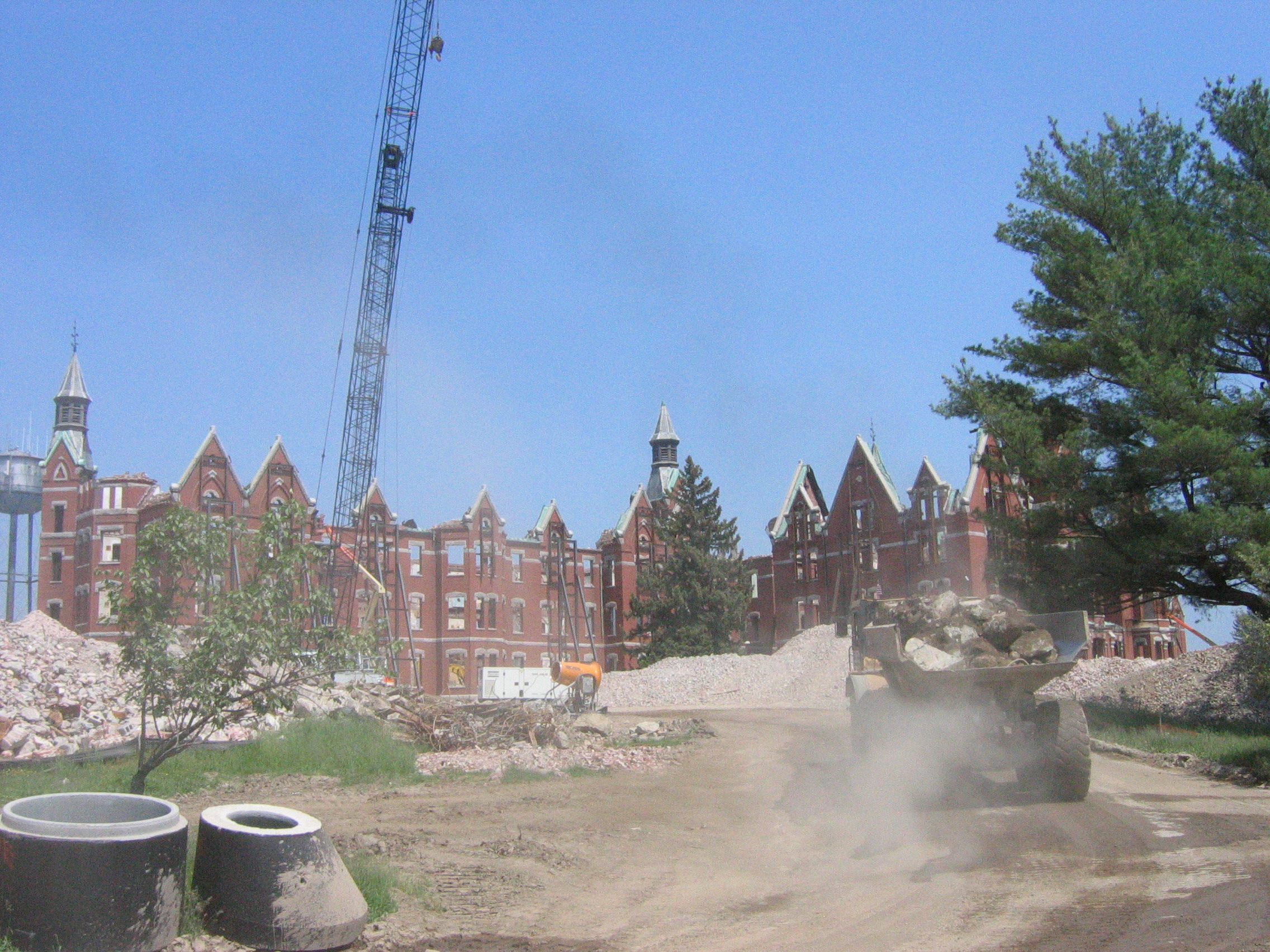
The demolition of the Danvers State Hospital in Danvers, Massachusetts, 2007

Due to their intricate architectural features and historical significance, Kirkbride Plan hospitals have attracted conservation efforts from local and national groups, and as of 2016, approximately 30 of the buildings have been registered with National Register of Historic Places. Local conservation groups and historical societies have made attempts to save numerous Kirkbrides from demolition: The Danvers State Hospital in Danvers, Massachusetts is one example, in which a local historical society filed a lawsuit in 2005 to stall demolition of the building. The majority of the Danvers State Hospital was demolished in 2007 in spite of the lawsuit, with only the center portion of the building receiving restoration and conversion into apartments. The Northampton State Hospital in Northampton, Massachusetts, was demolished in 2006.

Many of the surviving Kirkbride Plan buildings in the United States have undergone at least partial demolition and have been repurposed, often with the center portions of the buildings being most commonly preserved. The center complexes of the Hudson River State Hospital in Poughkeepsie, New York, and the Oregon State Hospital in Salem, Oregon, for example, have been retained in spite of the majority of the outermost wings being demolished. One such Kirkbride Plan facility that has survived in its entirety is the Trans-Allegheny Lunatic Asylum, though does not contemporarily function as an active hospital. As of 2023, Trans-Allegheny Lunatic Asylum has not undergone demolition.

Several facilities originally established as Kirkbride Plan hospitals are still active in the 21st century, though not all have retained the original Kirkbride buildings on their campuses. The Oregon State Hospital, the longest continuously operated psychiatric hospital on the West Coast, retained the majority of its original Kirkbride building during a 2008 demolition, seismically retrofitting and repurposing it as a mental health museum in 2013.

== Notable Kirkbride hospitals ==
=== United States ===
Built	Name	Location	Status	Notes	NRHP #	Ref.
1848	Trenton State Hospital	Trenton, New Jersey	Active	The first Kirkbride Plan building	—N/a	
1848	Central State Hospital	Indianapolis, Indiana	Inactive	One Kirkbride building, the Department for Women (1878), demolished 1970s	—N/a	
1848	Jacksonville State Hospital	Jacksonville, Illinois	Inactive	Original Kirkbride building demolished 1970	75000669	
1851	Harrisburg State Hospital	Harrisburg, Pennsylvania	Inactive	Original Kirkbride building demolished 1893	86000057	
1853	Taunton State Hospital	Taunton, Massachusetts	Demolished 2009		93001484	
1854	Western State Hospital	Hopkinsville, Kentucky	Active	Destroyed by fire in 1861; interiors rebuilt	79003612	
1854–66 (Note: The original hospital layout during its 1840 construction was not in the Kirkbride Plan, as it pre-dates it. However, after an 1850 fire destroyed part of the building, reconstruction converted the main hospital into a Kirkbride.)	Maine Insane Hospital	Augusta, Maine	Inactive	Original construction was not a Kirkbride; however, it was converted between 1854 and 1866	82000754	
1855	Jackson State Hospital	Jackson, Mississippi	Inactive	Original Kirkbride building demolished; campus now houses University of Mississippi Medical Center	—N/a	
1855	Dayton State Hospital	Dayton, Ohio	Inactive	Repurposed as assisted living facility	79001902	
1855	St. Elizabeths Hospital	Washington, D.C.	Active	Kirkbride now serves as DHS HQ	79003101	
1856	Austin State Hospital	Austin, Texas	Active	Original Kirkbride building houses administrative offices	87002115	
1858	Northampton State Hospital	Northampton, Massachusetts	Demolished 2006		94000696	
1858	Mendota Mental Health Institute	Madison, Wisconsin	Active	Original Kirkbride building demolished 1964	—N/a	
1859	The Institute of the Pennsylvania Hospital	Philadelphia, Pennsylvania	Inactive		66000684	
1859	Kalamazoo Regional Psychiatric Hospital	Kalamazoo, Michigan	Inactive	Original Kirkbride building demolished	—N/a	
1859	Bryce Hospital	Tuscaloosa, Alabama	Inactive	Sold to the adjacent University of Alabama and partially demolished (main part saved)	77000216	
1862	Dixmont State Hospital	Pittsburgh, Pennsylvania	Demolished 2005		80003401	
1863	Trans-Allegheny Lunatic Asylum	Weston, West Virginia	Inactive	Formerly known as Weston State Hospital	78002805	
1865	Mount Pleasant State Hospital	Mount Pleasant, Iowa	Destroyed 1936	Original Kirkbride building destroyed in fire	—N/a	
1866	St. Peter State Hospital (now Minnesota Security Hospital)	St. Peter, Minnesota	Active	Majority of original Kirkbride building demolished	—N/a	
1868	Hudson River State Hospital	Poughkeepsie, New York	Inactive	Undergoing demolition as of 2016; portion of original Kirkbride building preserved until damaged by fire in June 2026.	89001166	
1868	Osawatomie State Hospital	Osawatomie, Kansas	Active	Original Kirkbride building demolished between 1971 and 2002	—N/a	
1869	Anna State Hospital	Anna, Illinois	Inactive	Administration section of original Kirkbride building remains and is in use	—N/a	
1869	Central State Hospital	Anchorage, Kentucky	Demolished 1996		83002646	
1869	Danville State Hospital	Danville, Pennsylvania	Active	Original Kirkbride building preserved and in use	—N/a	
1870	Central State Hospital	Petersburg, Virginia	Active	Original Kirkbride building demolished	—N/a	
1870	Buffalo State Hospital	Buffalo, New York	Inactive	Original Kirkbride building restored and subdivided by State of New York for public use	73001186	
1872	Spring Grove State Hospital	Catonsville, Maryland	Demolished 1963		—N/a	
1872	Elgin State Hospital	Elgin, Illinois	Active	Original Kirkbride building demolished 1993	—N/a	
1872	Topeka State Hospital	Topeka, Kansas	Demolished 2010		—N/a	
1873	Winnebago State Hospital	Oshkosh, Wisconsin	Active	Original Kirkbride demolished in stages between 1950 and 1969	—N/a	
1873	Independence State Hospital	Independence, Iowa	Active		—N/a	
1874	Athens Lunatic Asylum	Athens, Ohio	Inactive	Renovated and repurposed by Ohio University	80002936	
1874	Warren State Hospital	Warren, Pennsylvania	Active		—N/a	
1876	Greystone Park Psychiatric Hospital	Hanover, New Jersey	Active	Original Kirkbride building demolished 2015	—N/a	
1876	Napa State Hospital	Napa, California	Active	Original Kirkbride building demolished 1949	—N/a	
1877	Columbus State Hospital	Columbus, Ohio	Demolished 1991		—N/a	
1877	Worcester State Hospital	Worcester, Massachusetts	Active	demolished	80000530	
1878	Danvers State Hospital	Danvers, Massachusetts	Demolished 2006	Center exterior of Kirkbride building preserved	84002436	
1878	Pontiac State Hospital	Pontiac, Michigan	Demolished 2000		81000315	
1879	Kankakee State Hospital	Kankakee, Illinois	Active	Original Kirkbride building preserved	—N/a	
1883	Oregon State Hospital	Salem, Oregon	Active	Original Kirkbride building repurposed as mental health museum	08000118	
1883	Broughton Hospital	Morganton, North Carolina	Active		77000996	
1883	Arkansas State Hospital	Little Rock, Arkansas	Active	Kirkbride building demolished 1963	—N/a	
1884	Clarinda State Hospital	Clarinda, Iowa	Inactive		—N/a	
1885	Northern Michigan Asylum	Traverse City, Michigan	Inactive	Center of main building demolished and replaced in 1963, remainder renovated and in use as condos and businesses	78001499	
1885	Agnews State Hospital	Santa Clara, California	Inactive	Original Kirkbride building destroyed in 1906 earthquake; partially rebuilt in 1910	97000829	
1885	Terrell State Hospital	Terrell, Texas	Active	Original Kirkbride building demolished	—N/a	
1887	Nevada State Hospital	Nevada, Missouri	Demolished 1999		—N/a	
1890	Cherokee Mental Health Institute	Cherokee, Iowa	Active		—N/a	
1891	Sheppard Pratt Hospital	Towson, Maryland	Active		71000369	
1891	Eastern State Hospital	Medical Lake, Washington	Active	Original Kirkbride building demolished	—N/a	
1892	San Antonio State Hospital	San Antonio, Texas	Active	Originally Named Southwestern Insane Asylum until 1925. Original Kirkbride building demolished and replaced in the 1970s	—N/a	
1893	Mendocino State Hospital	Ukiah, California	Inactive	Original Kirkbride building demolished in 1952	—N/a	
1893	Patton State Hospital	San Bernardino, California	Active	Original Kirkbride building demolished	—N/a	
1894	St. Vincent's Hospital	Normandy, Missouri	Inactive	Original Kirkbride building repurposed as apartment building	82004722	
1895	Fergus Falls Regional Treatment Center	Fergus Falls, Minnesota	Inactive		86001386	
1913	Eastern Oregon State Hospital	Pendleton, Oregon	Inactive	Houses Eastern Oregon Correctional Institution as of 1983	—N/a	

=== Outside the United States ===
Built	Name	Location	Status	Notes	Ref.
1958	Nova Scotia Hospital	Halifax, Nova Scotia, Canada	Active	Original Kirkbride building demolished 1996	(Note: Per a c. 1858 lithograph of the Nova Scotia Hospital floor plan, the hospital's original building was modeled after the Kirkbride Plan. The Nova Scotia Hospital is also referenced in footnotes of The Architecture of Madness: Insane Asylums in the United States (2007) as being influenced by the Kirkbride Plan; however, its "double-loaded hallways" were a noted modification on the Kirkbride design.)
1985	Callan Park Hospital for the Insane	Lilyfield, New South Wales, Australia	Inactive	Original Kirkbride building preserved; campus houses Sydney College of the Arts	

== In popular culture ==
Numerous Kirkbride Plan hospitals and buildings have been featured in the arts: the Danvers State Hospital in Danvers, Massachusetts was both the setting and primary filming location for the 2001 psychological horror film Session 9. It has also been suggested by historians as an inspiration on H. P. Lovecraft, and an inspiration for the fictional setting Arkham Asylum in the Batman series.

The Oregon State Hospital was featured as the primary filming location for the film One Flew Over the Cuckoo's Nest (1975), and the setting of Ward 81, a 1976 series of photographs by photographer Mary Ellen Mark.

The Trans-Allegheny Lunatic Asylum in West Virginia was featured on the Travel Channel reality series Ghost Adventures.

== Gallery ==
Notable Kirkbride buildings

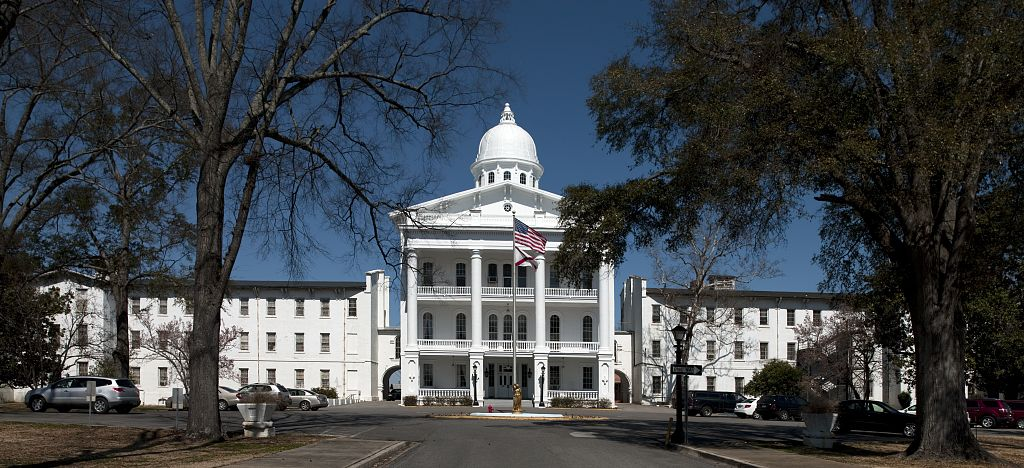
Bryce Hospital, Tuscaloosa, Alabama

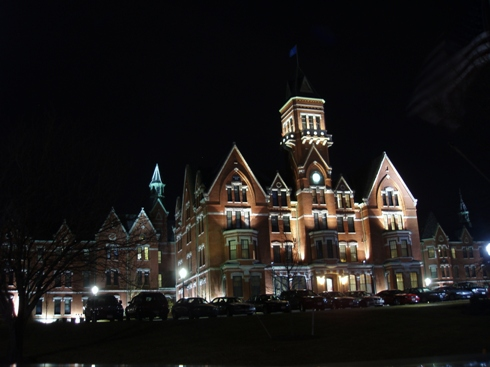
Danvers State Hospital, Danvers, Massachusetts †

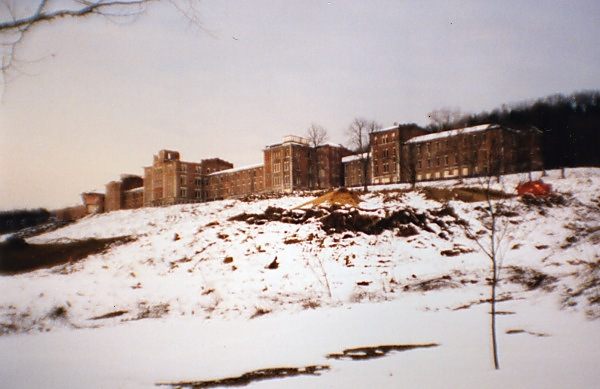
Dixmont State Hospital, Pittsburgh, Pennsylvania †

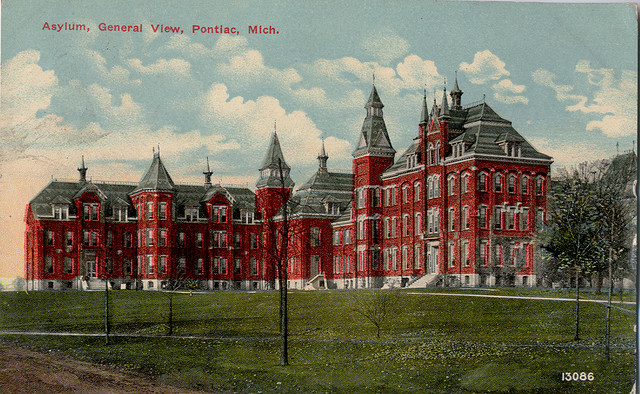
Eastern Michigan Asylum for the Insane, Pontiac, Michigan †

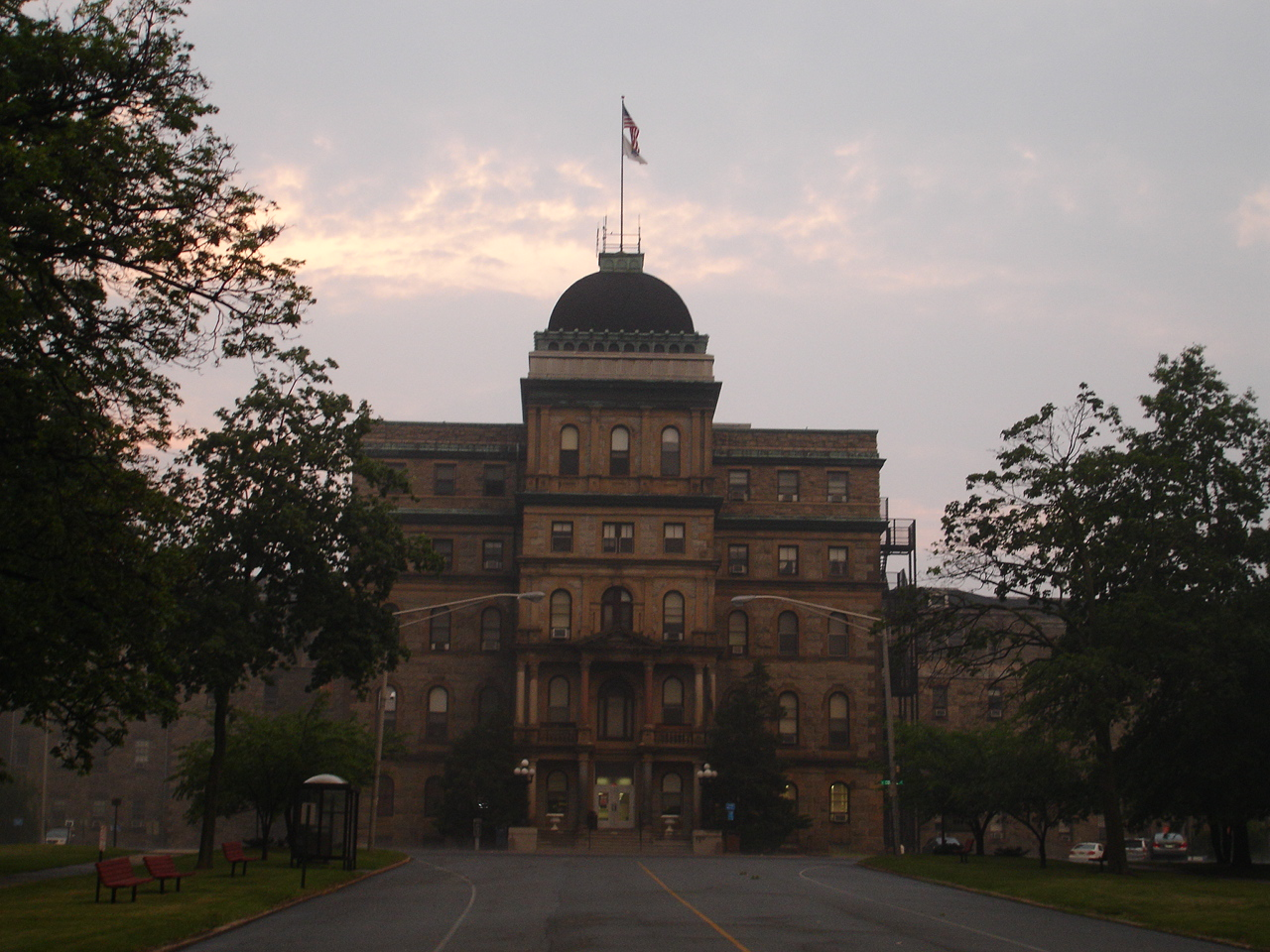
Greystone Park Psychiatric Hospital, Morris Plains, New Jersey †

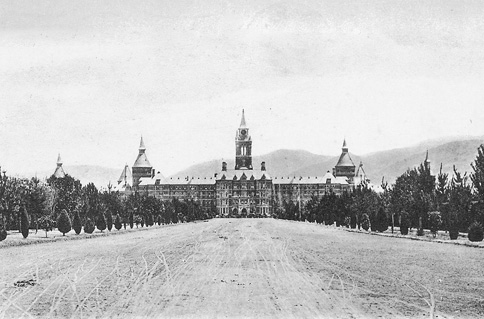
Napa State Hospital, Napa, California †

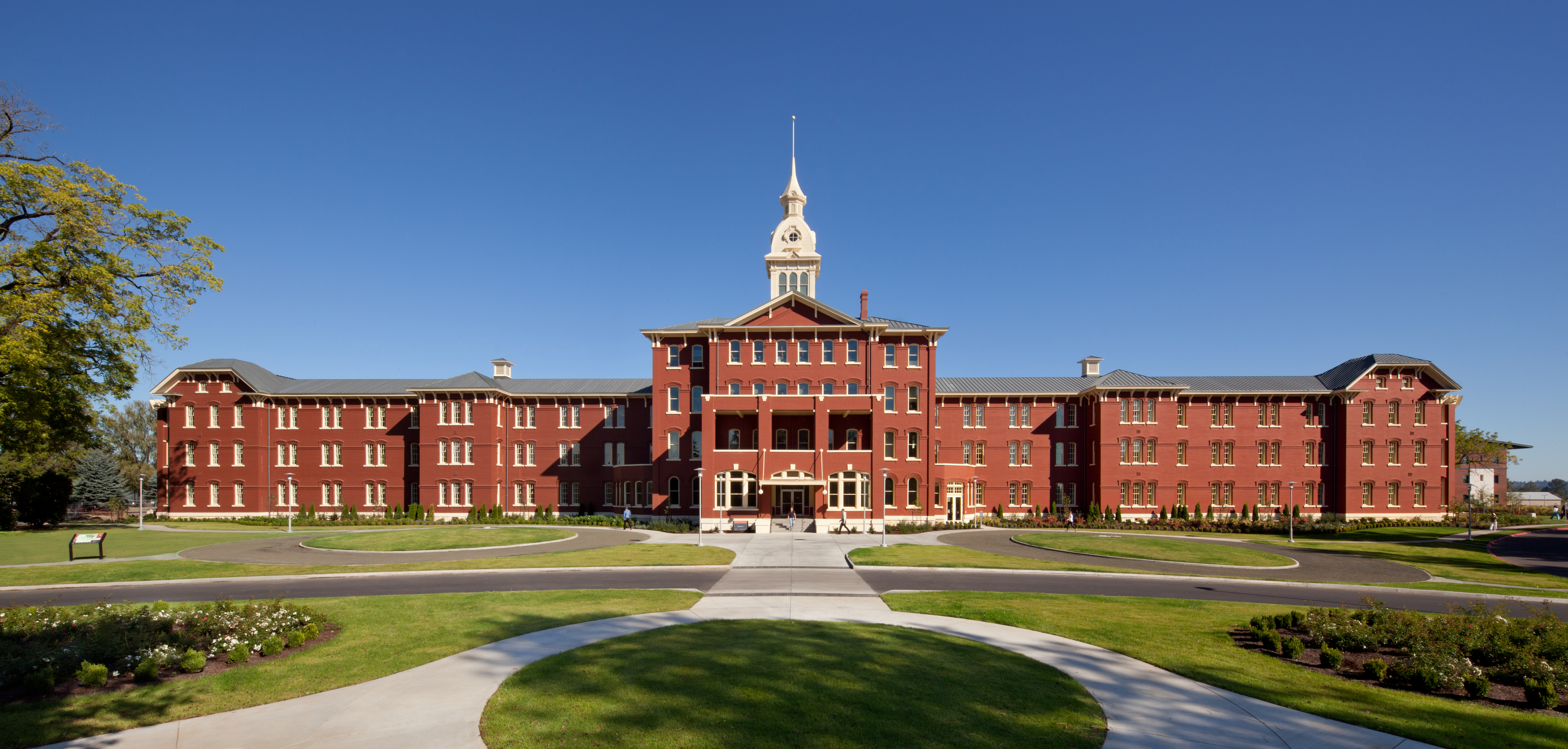
Oregon State Hospital, Salem, Oregon

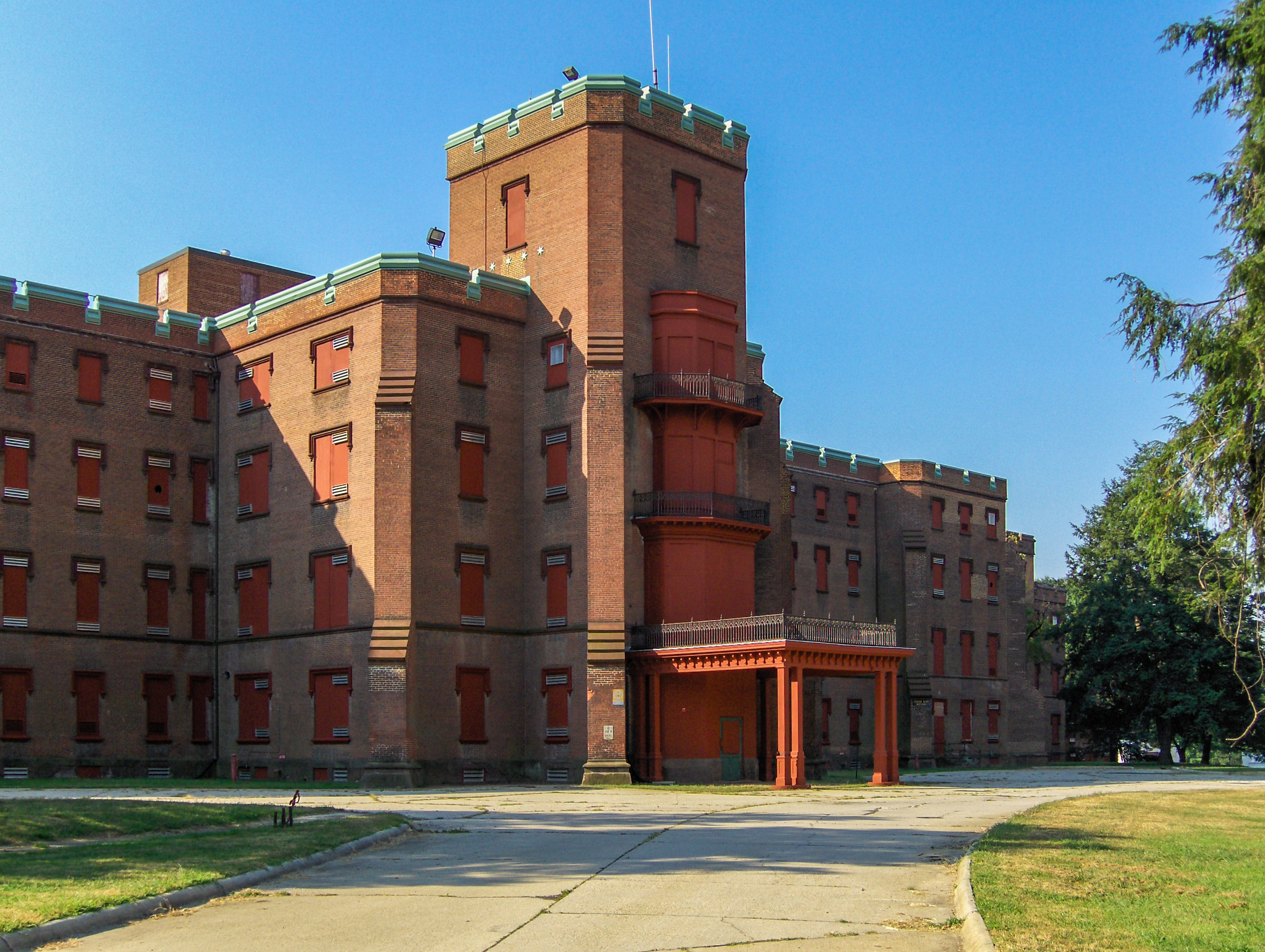
St. Elizabeths Hospital, Washington, D.C.

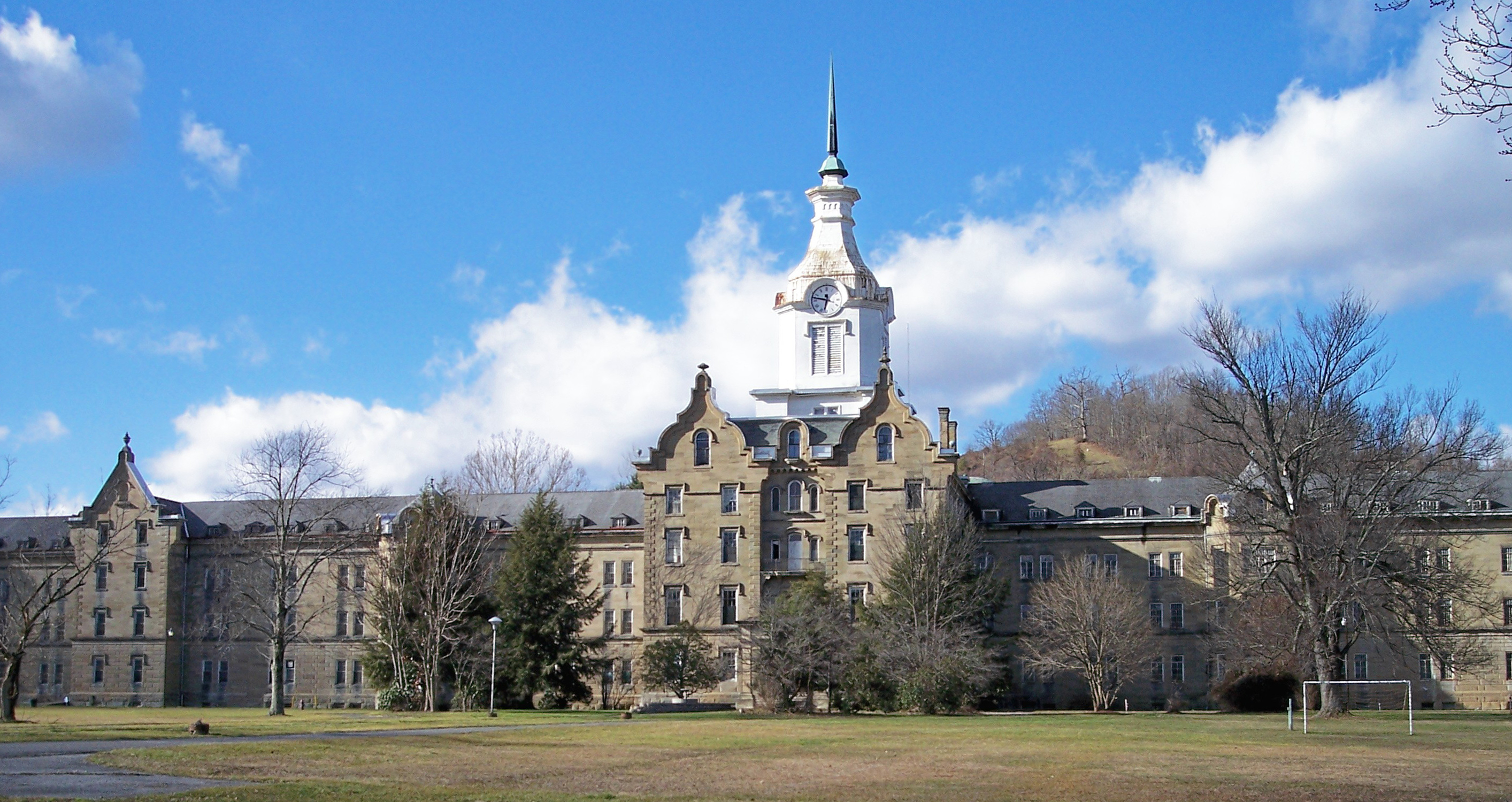
Trans-Allegheny Lunatic Asylum, Weston, West Virginia

† demolished

== Works cited ==
- Goeres-Gardner, Diane L. (2013). Inside Oregon State Hospital: A History of Tragedy and Triumph. The History Press. ISBN 978-1-62619-040-5.
- Hoopes, Lauren (May 2015). On the Periphery: A Survey of Nineteenth-Century Asylums in the United States (Thesis). Clemson University.
- Hurd, Henry Mills, ed. (1916). The Institutional Care of the Insane in the United States and Canada. Vol. 2. Johns Hopkins Press. p. 434. ISBN 9780405052101 – via Google Books.
- Kirkbride, Thomas Story (1854). On the Construction, Organization, and General Arrangements of Hospitals for the Insane. Lindsay & Blakiston – via Internet Archive. "kirkbride."
- Murphy, Mardita M. (2016). Preserving the Kirkbride Legacy: An Analysis of the Extant State of the Plan and Challenges of Adaptive Reuse (Thesis). University of North Carolina, Greensboro.
- Verderber, Stephen (2010). Innovations in Hospital Architecture. Routledge. ISBN 978-0-415-77795-7.
- Yanni, Carla (2007). The Architecture of Madness: Insane Asylums in the United States. Minnesota University Press. ISBN 978-0-8166-4940-2.
