= Mount Pleasant Mental Health Institute =

Former psychiatric facility in Iowa

The Mount Pleasant Mental Health Institute was a psychiatric institution located in Mount Pleasant, Iowa, USA. Originally known as the Iowa Lunatic Asylum, it opened in 1861. It is located on the same campus as The Mount Pleasant Correctional Facility. There was also a labyrinth of tunnels which connected every building. It was the first asylum in Iowa and was built under the Kirkbride Plan.

== History ==
It was constructed between 1855 and 1865 at a cost of $400,000. The first patient was admitted in February 1861. It is a Kirkbride building, and was the first asylum in Iowa. The Mount Pleasant Mental Health Institute is the oldest of the Iowa Department of Human Services facilities that serve persons affected by mental illness.

In 1936, a fire destroyed most of the administration section, leaving only a kitchen area at the back. In 1946, the facility reached its peak occupancy of 1,581 patients. Since 1945, new therapies and medications have helped to lower the facility's population, and the individual's average length of stay has been reduced from years to a matter of weeks.

This allowed the facility to release many of its patients and eventually reassign the patients to Cherokee Mental Health Institute (Cherokee, Iowa) and Independence State Hospital (Independence, Iowa), which are still in use today, and to Clarinda Treatment Complex (Clarinda, Iowa), which also closed in 2015. It has been known by many names, including the Mount Pleasant Insane Asylum, the Mount Pleasant Hospital for the Insane and the Mount Pleasant Mental Health Institute.

Former Iowa Governor Terry Branstad announced in January 2015 that he would close Mount Pleasant and Clarinda MHIs that year. There were plans to develop a "crisis line", which will treat chronic mental health disorders like schizophrenia. Both MHIs closed in June 2015.

The architect of the building, Thomas Story Kirkbride, had an inclusive plan for such structures, including the requirement that staff live on or near the premises and that "guests" be assigned meaningful work. More than thirty such structures still remain.
