= Laurie Faria Stolarz =

American author

Laurie Faria Stolarz is an American author of young adult fiction novels featuring teenage protagonists, best known of which are the series of books beginning with Blue is for Nightmares.

== Early life and education ==
Stolarz grew up in Salem, Massachusetts. She attended Merrimack College and later Emerson College, both in Massachusetts.

== Career ==
Stolarz found sales success with her first novel, Blue is for Nightmares, and followed it up with three more titles in the series, White is for Magic, Silver is for Secrets, and Red is for Remembrance. The four novels in the "BIFN" series have sold over 500,000 copies collectively. Stolarz also announced a graphic novel entry into the series titled Black is for Beginnings, which she published in summer 2009.

Stolarz published Bleed in September 2006 and a companion novel, Project 17, in December 2007. Project 17 is set at the former Danvers State Hospital, which was demolished that same year.

On June 10, 2022, it was announced that a Blue Is for Nightmares podcast is being produced, adapted by Stephanie Wu. It is a joint production between The Hideaway Entertainment and Fictionz. Debbie Moon will also adapt the novels into a television series.

== Bibliography ==
- Blue is for Nightmares series
  - Blue is for Nightmares, Llewellyn Publications, November 2003, ISBN 0-7387-0391-5
  - White is for Magic, Llewellyn Publications, May 2004, ISBN 0-7387-0443-1
  - Silver is for Secrets, Llewellyn Publications, January 2005, ISBN 0-7387-0631-0
  - Red is for Remembrance, Llewellyn Publications, August 2005, ISBN 0-7387-0760-0
    - A box set of these four novels was published as The Blue is for Nightmares Collection by Llewellyn's new young adult imprint, Flux, in September 2006 (ISBN 0-7387-0988-3)
  - Black is for Beginnings, Flux, September 2009, ISBN 0-7387-1438-0 (graphic novel continuation)
- Bleed, Hyperion, September 2006, ISBN 0-7868-3854-X
- Project 17, Hyperion, December 2007, ISBN 0-7868-3856-6
- Touch series
  - Deadly Little Secret, Hyperion, December 2008, ISBN 1-4231-1144-3
  - Deadly Little Lies, Hyperion, November 2009, ISBN 1-4231-1145-1
  - Deadly Little Games, Hyperion, December 28, 2010 ISBN 9781423131601
  - Deadly Little Voices, Hyperion, December 6, 2011, ISBN 9781423131618
  - Deadly Little Lessons, Hyperion, December 18, 2012, ISBN 1-4231-3162-2
- Shattered: The Amanda Project #3, HarperTeen, December 27, 2011, ISBN 9780061742170
- Dark House series
  - Welcome to the Dark House, Hyperion, July 22, 2014, ISBN 9781423181736
  - Return to the Dark House, Hyperion, July 21, 2015, ISBN 9781423181736
- Shutter, Hyperion, October 18, 2016, ISBN 9781484727904
- Jane Anonymous, Wednesday Books, January 7, 2020, ISBN 9781250303707
