= Twisted Showcase =

British independent web television series

Twisted Showcase is a British independent web television series, created by Robin Bell and Rhys Jones. It is described as a mixture of self-contained horror, sci-fi, psychological thriller, and comedy.

== Production ==
Twisted Showcase was created by Bell and Jones who wanted to make something different with a strong focus on story. They both write for the series and are producers of the show. Each episode is a standalone story.

A third series was produced for 2014 with episodes featuring Red Dwarf actor Norman Lovett and Torchwood and Doctor Who star Gareth David-Lloyd.

A fourth series was slated for release in 2016 with an episode called "Muscle Memory" written by Debbie Moon and an episode featuring Gareth David-Lloyd's directorial debut. The fourth season did not end up premiering until October 2017 with the episode, "Be My Head."

== Reception ==
Twisted Showcase was recognized in 2012 when it was named in The Guardian top 25 must watch web shows, the only British series in the top 25.
