= Cherokee Mental Health Institute =

- Iowa Department of Human Services
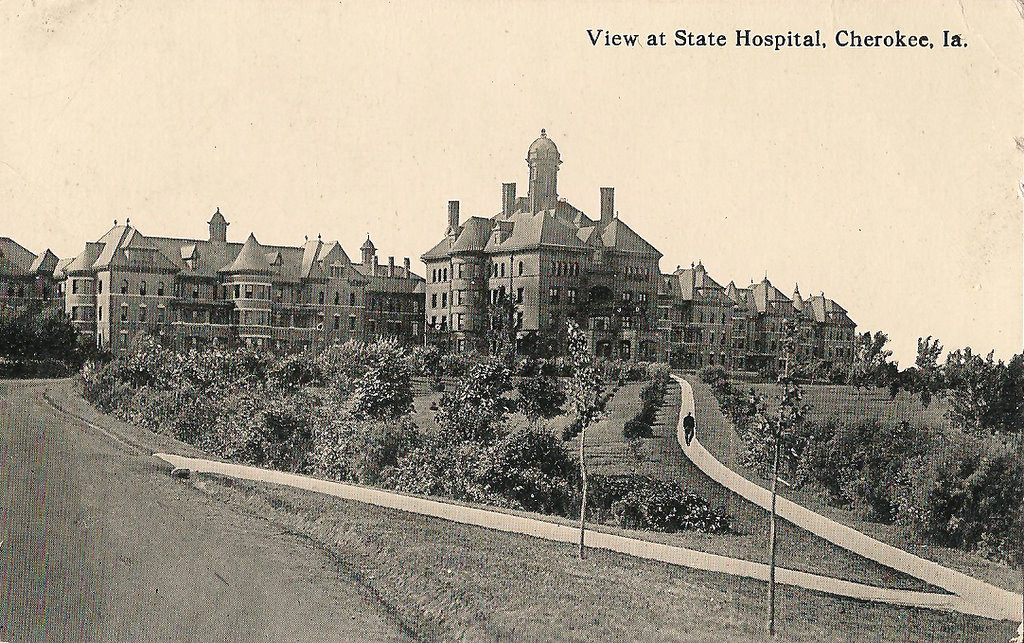
- Cherokee Mental Health Institute in 1915

Geography
- Location: Cherokee, Iowa, United States
- Coordinates: 42.757°N 95.573°W

Organization
- Type: Specialist

Services
- Speciality: Psychiatric hospital

History
- Opened: 1902

Links
- Lists: Hospitals in Iowa

The Cherokee Mental Health Institute is a state-run psychiatric facility in Cherokee, Iowa. It opened in 1902 and is under the authority of the Iowa Department of Human Services.

== History ==
=== Early years ===
As early as 1890, a movement was begun to build a fourth mental hospital in the state and northwest Iowa was the logical location for it. The plan was to relieve crowding from the other hospitals in Mount Pleasant, Iowa, Clarinda, Iowa, Independence, Iowa, In 1894, Cherokee residents started an active campaign to get the legislature to select their city for the new hospital. Many other northwest Iowa towns also vied for the hospital, including Sheldon, LeMars, Fort Dodge, Storm Lake and "Pocahontas Center." It took 14 ballots in the legislature to give Cherokee the hospital. The legislature appropriated $12,000 to purchase a site, but it was six and a half years after the first excavation before the administration building, sitting on bare prairie land, was ready for occupancy. There was a struggle each session of the legislature to get appropriations to continue with the building. The original plan for patients was to hold alcoholics, geriatrics, drug addicts, the mentally-ill, and the criminally-insane.

The hospital was opened for patients on August 15, 1902 under the name "Cherokee Lunatic Asylum." The name changed several times over the years, going from "Iowa Lunatic Asylum" to "Cherokee State Hospital." The first Superintendent, Dr. N. Nelson Voldeng, worked all the summer to equip and ready it for 700 patients. From August 15 to August 26, eight patients were admitted. On August 26, 1902, 306 patients were transferred from Independence and two days later 252 from Clarinda. These patients were brought by special trains and met with teams and hayracks at the end of the Illinois Central Railroad spur and transported to the hospital. The dormitory for employees, built in the 1940s was named Wirth Hall in 1962 for the late J.E. Wirth, business manager here many years.

=== Later developments ===
Over the years, a significant change has occurred in the patient/staff ratio and employee salaries/benefits. In 1910, 81 persons were employed in the nursing service department, caring for 881 patients. These employees worked 12 to 14 hours per day, with one half-day off per week, for a base salary of $24.00 to $30.00 per month, plus room and board. Most of the living quarters were located in the wards where the patients also resided.

Beginning with about 600 patients, the hospital population increased year by year until the peak was reached in December 1945 with a total patient census/population of 1,729, beds in every hall and every building being overtaxed. Then began the gradual campaign to send patients who had reached maximum hospital benefits back to their own counties. Initially, social workers found placements for the mentally-retarded and the indigent in the community and at the "county farms." With the discovery of psychotropic drugs in the 1950s, the push for getting rid of restraints, community-based services and the establishment of Mental Health Centers in the 1960s, the massive asylum census continued its decline. Today, the average daily census is approximately 44 patients as the emphasis for community-based services increases and lengths of stay shorten due to medical advances and psychosocial rehabilitation.

Cherokee Mental Health Institute (CMHI) is one of 11 programs at the "Cherokee Regional Resource Center," a 208-acre (0.84 km^{2}) campus under the direction of the Iowa Department of Human Services. Out of Iowa's 99 counties, CMHI serves the public mental health needs of 41 counties for adults and 56 for adolescents. CMHI receives 530 inpatient admission per year, has an average daily inpatient census of 44 patients, and an average length of stay of 25 days.

Most of the south wing, also known as CCUSO, or the Civil Commitment Unit for Sexual Offenders, is surrounded by prison-grade fencing. It also holds criminally-insane and violent patients.

== Photos ==
- Buildings
