= Project 17 =

2007 novel by Laurie Faria Stolarz

- The US cover for Project 17
- Author: Laurie Faria Stolarz
- Language: English
- Genre: Young adult novel
- Publisher: Hyperion Books
- Publication date: December 1, 2007
- Media type: Print (Hardback & Paperback)
- ISBN: 0-7868-3856-6
- OCLC: 124036172
- LC Class: PZ7.S8757 Pr 2007

Project 17 is a young adult novel, written by Laurie Faria Stolarz, published by Hyperion Books in 2007. It tells the tale of six teens who break into the abandoned mental institution, the Danvers State Hospital.

== Plot ==
The Danvers State Hospital, located just outside Boston, Massachusetts, was built in 1878 and condemned in 1992. It is rumored by locals to be the birthplace of the pre-frontal lobotomy. The novel begins at 7 AM, with Derik riding up to the Danvers State Hospital in his car. Looking at the crumbling brick building, he starts to think of the people that were locked up in there, the people who died after spending their lives there. The unmarked mass graves around the premises, the tunnels, and the messed up remnants of its former patients. He knows this is the place. The place where he'd make his movie. Derik is flunking out of school, and he decides to submit his film to a contest and save himself from a future of flipping burgers at his parents' diner. He gathers a cast of different backgrounds, and the eve before the hospitals' demolition, they break in. He gets more than he bargained for when the eerie experience changes his life. Forever.

== Characters ==
Derik: The director of the movie, his love interest is Liza. He is an underachiever who wants to achieve something big before he graduates.

Mimi: The goth of the group. Her motive for helping Derik is to investigate the life of her grandma, who was a patient at the hospital. She makes it her duty to rescue Christine Belle's doll; Christy after discovering her journal. Develops a strong bond

Greta: One of two "drama kids" in the group. She aspires to be like actress Greta Garbo in every way possible. Her boyfriend is Tony. Greta's motive for working on Derik's film is the opportunity to be on television and possibly launch her acting career.

Tony: One of two "drama kids" in the group. His girlfriend is Greta. Tony's motive for visiting the hospital is identical to Greta's.

Chet: The jokester of the group. His dad is an alcoholic, which leads to a black eye. Chet's motive for helping out Derik is the opportunity to spend a night away from his troubled home life. It is hinted that he has a crush on Mimi.

Liza: The braniac of the group, and Derik's love interest. Liza is wait-listed for admission to Harvard University. Her school guidance counselor advises her to try to get involved in more extra-curricular activities, which leads to her agreeing to help Derik with his film.
