= True Love (Once Removed) =

- True Love (Once Removed) Sacramento Film Festival Promotional Poster, 2004
- Directed by: Kevin Thomas
- Written by: Debbie Moon
- Produced by: Phillippa Thomas; Liefer B. Daffinsson
- Starring: Sean Harris; Philip Jackson; Sigurdur Skúlason; Harpa Ellertsdottir; Abigail Rosser
- Cinematography: Bob Pendar-Hughes
- Edited by: Bryan Dyke
- Music by: Overlap
- Production company: Thomas Thomas Films
- Release date: 2002 (United Kingdom)
- Running time: 35 minutes
- Country: United Kingdom
- Language: English

True Love (Once Removed) is a 2002 British short drama film directed by Kevin Thomas and starring Sean Harris, Philip Jackson, Sigurdur Skúlason, Harpa Ellertsdottir and Abigail Rosser. It was written by Debbie Moon and concerns the belief in a fated destiny versus the free will to form a future.

== Plot ==
Steven lives in an isolated fishing village. He is a fish gutter who uses his meager earnings to view his future in illegal time machine. These time machines have been outlawed by the government due to their unintended consequences. Steven knows someday he will be loved and the woman will be-a psychiatric nurse in his future. However, his love is presently Bryony Lafferty, an 8-year-old girl. He is only in love with the adult Bryony.

Steven hints about the future with a local bus driver. Steven realizes that the bus driver also uses the illegal time booths but the driver's experience has shown an unhappy outcome for the bus driver's marriage. Steven tells the driver that the bus driver should not worry, as the future may not happen. Steven, of course, does not really believe this. The bus driver, angry and cynical, tells Steven the same can happen to Steven's own future. This unsettles Steven. Steven is also growing impatient because he has a long time to wait before Bryony will become a woman. When Steven discovers that Bryony's family is selling their home and moving away he is frantic.

Steven sees a psychiatrist on an occasional basis, but he is at odds with advice because he only wants concurrence. The psychiatrist is unable to impress upon Steven that it is the choices we make that determine our future—not a machine.

When Steven discovers that Bryony's family is not moving away, he begins working on a plan. Steven tells the bus driver that nothing changes; the future cannot be altered, as proof since Bryony's family will not move away. The bus driver becomes more agitated, believing his marriage is doomed, as predicted. The bus driver goes off, getting very drunk. The bus driver confronts his wife over this predicted affair that only he has viewed. He beats her, pouring petrol down her throat in punishment for a "future" only he "knows."

Steven sets his plan in motion to get Bryony alone, but does not touch her. He apologizes and tells her that when they are together it will be wonderful, but only in the future. Steven tells himself that what will happen to him (enforced incarceration in a psychiatric hospital) will put him in place so that he can meet Bryony as a future nurse. Steven is arrested and Bryony's parents arrive police station to take her home.

The psychiatrist comes to see Steven at the police station. The psychiatrist knows that Steven is not a pedophile, but that Steven uses the illegal time machines and then created a faked attempt upon Bryony to get placed into psychiatric care. Steven begs the psychiatrist to say the right words that will get him confined.

The news comes on the television with a report about the attack on the woman at the petrol station. Her employer is now constantly at her bedside while she recovers; the bus driver's future is now completed, as predicted. However, the news also reports that the drunken bus driver has crashed into Bryony's parents’ car as they were taking her home from the police station after her Steven confronted her.

The psychiatrist, seeing the news, rushes to the police station to see Steven, but Steven is being sent to a facility and the psychiatrist does not tell Steven of the accident with the bus. Steven is taken to psychiatric confinement, satisfied that he has attained the first step he needs to be placed in Bryony's future. However, Steven's true love has tragically died in the accident with the bus, caused by the events set in motion by Steven's plan to be with her in his distant future.

== Cast ==
- Sean Harris as Steven
- Philip Jackson as the bus driver
- Sigurdur Skulason as the psychiatrist.
- Harpa Ellertsdottir as 8-year old Bryony
- Abigail Rosser as adult Bryony

== Production ==
Production for this film was by Thomas Thomas Films.

Primary location filming was done in Iceland, with studio work in the UK.

== Awards ==
Won Best Live Action Short Film over 15 minutes in length at the Palm Springs Film Festival, and Best Short Film at the Houston Film Festival as well as being selected for Clermont Ferrand, London Raindance and LA Short Film Festival and qualifying for Oscar nomination. Made eligible for the 2004 Academy Awards where it was shortlisted.
