= Blue Is for Nightmares =

Series of novels by Laurie Faria Stolarz

Blue is for Nightmares
- First edition cover of first novel
- Blue is for Nightmares, White is for Magic, Silver is for Secrets, Red is for Remembrance, Black is for Beginnings
- Author: Laurie Faria Stolarz
- Country: United States
- Language: English
- Genre: Young adult novel
- Publisher: Llewellyn Publishing
- Published: November 2003 - September 2009 (initial publication)
- Media type: Print (Paperback)

Blue Is for Nightmares is a young adult mystery novel and subsequent eponymous series by Laurie Faria Stolarz. The first book in the series, Blue is for Nightmares, was made an "ALA’s Young Adult Library Services Association as a Quick Pick for Reluctant Readers in 2005 and as a Popular Paperback for Young Adults in 2007."

== Series synopsis ==
The Blue is for Nightmares series follows the adventures of Stacey Brown, a young witch with psychic powers. Stacey uses her folk magic to enhance her natural abilities in order to investigate crimes, disappearances, or issues that arise in her daily life. As the series progresses Stacey graduates from high school, learns how to better harness her abilities, and sorts through her complicated love life.

=== Blue Is for Nightmares ===
Stacey Brown, a 16-year-old Junior at Hillcrest Boarding School, is a hereditary folk magic practitioner through her grandmother. Stacey wants to have a normal high school experience, but all that is hindered when she starts having terrifying nightmares about the death of her best friend and roommate, Drea. It is not the first time she's had these prophetic nightmares. 3 years ago, a girl she used to babysit, Maura, was murdered. Stacey had ignored her nightmares about the young girl's death, and then Maura was killed; now she is having those strange dreams again. Who would be the key to solving this supernatural mystery? As the time passes by, Stacey doesn't know what to do and whom to expect to be the culprit. Suspicions first settle on a strange man in the garden who turns out to be the father of her arch enemy, Veronica, then her secret crush (and Drea's boyfriend) Chad, then his roommate Donovan, then their friend P.J. and even Amber. Stacey is so confused when a sudden death strikes the school.

=== White Is for Magic ===
It is Stacey's senior year, one year after she saved her roommate and best friend, Drea, from an untimely death. Now, back at Hillcrest Boarding School, she's having nightmares again and receiving strange letters with no name or return address. This time her nightmares are of ghosts of people who have been brutally murdered. But she's not the only one having nightmares. A transfer student, Jacob, is having nightmares of Stacey's murder, and he's determined to stop the killer. Stacey should be focusing on her classes and getting into college, not to mention her rocky love life with Chad, but she just can't ignore the dreams and secretive notes.

=== Silver Is for Secrets ===
Stacey has finished her high school days at Hillcrest Boarding School, and now it's summertime. She, her new boyfriend Jacob, and some friends, Chad, PJ, Amber, and Drea, are going to stay at a cottage on the beach for the summer.

Before too long, Stacey starts having nightmares yet again. This time, however, they aren't about one of her friends; they're about another girl, Clara, staying at a different beachside cottage. During the time they met, Clara seems to flirt with every guy possible. Yet Stacey can't just stand by and watch Clara die, but her dreams aren't always clear. This time, they don't warn her about a horrific outcome and a disaster beyond her worst nightmares that will haunt her for life that she never even saw coming.

=== Red Is for Remembrance ===
Stacy Brown, now about to start Beacon University, hasn't been the same since her boyfriend died. She's stayed at the beachside cottage they shared for months with her friend Amber, refusing to rejoin the outside world. Once she starts having nightmares again, the college president calls her for a private meeting. He reveals that his daughter, Porsha, is having nightmares, too. While Stacy dreams of a ghost, Porsha dreams of a murder she's convinced hasn't happened yet. Together they decode their dark and disturbing dreams to save someone's life, which may result in the ending, if not both, of their own.

=== Black Is for Beginnings ===
Stacey's nightmares are back. And all she wants to do is go to Colorado and work things out with Jacob, who hasn't been able to remember her since he lost his memory in his brush with death. But before Stacey and Jacob can have a future, they must face their pasts. Black is for Beginnings reveals the never-before-seen backstory of Jacob and Stacey.

This volume is in graphic novel format, with art by Janina Görrissen and co-written by Barbara Randall Kesel.

== Reception and response ==
Reception to the series has been positive, with the series having 500,000 copies in print as of 2009. The Berks County Reading Eagle praised both Blue is for Nightmares and White is for Magic, citing that having the Stacey go "through issues that teens deal with today" as one of the highlights of the book. Of Blue is for Nightmares, the Free Lance Star wrote that the book was "worth reading, especially if you have an interest in witchcraft".

== Adaptations ==
On June 10, 2022, it was announced a podcast drama is being produced, adapted by Stephanie Wu. It is a joint production between The Hideaway Entertainment and Fictionz. In addition, Debbie Moon will also adapt the novels to television.
