= Clinton Valley Center =

- Eastern Michigan Asylum Historic District
- U.S. National Register of Historic Places
- U.S. Historic district
- Michigan State Historic Site
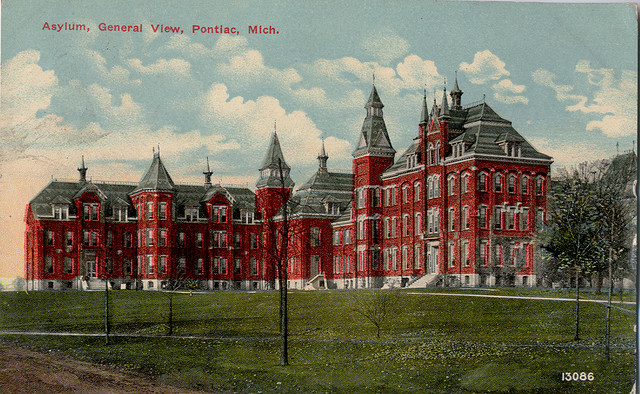
- Pontiac State Hospital, c. 1912

- Location within Michigan Location within the United States
- Interactive map
- Location: 140 Elizabeth Lake Rd., Pontiac, Michigan
- Coordinates: 42°38′43.7″N 83°19′20.6″W
- Area: 412 acres (167 ha)
- Built: 1878
- Architect: Elijah E. Myers (main building); Smith, Hinchman & Grylls (chapel)
- Architectural style: Late Victorian, Italianate, Italian Renaissance
- NRHP reference No.: 81000315; 86001367 (decrease)

Significant dates
- Added to NRHP: March 20, 1981
- Boundary decrease: 1986
- Designated MSHS: September 17, 1974

The Clinton Valley Center (CVC), originally called the Eastern Michigan Asylum for the Insane, was a psychiatric hospital located at 140 Elizabeth Lake Road in Pontiac, Michigan. The facility was designated a Michigan State Historic Site in 1974 and listed on the National Register of Historic Places in 1981, with a decrease in its boundaries in 1986. The facility was closed in 1997 and demolished in 2000.

== History ==
In 1873, to alleviate the overcrowding at the Kalamazoo psychiatric hospital, the Michigan state legislature appropriated $400,000 for the construction of a second hospital in eastern Michigan. Cities in the area were requested to bid for the project, and Pontiac won out over Detroit and other cities. The architect for the original main hospital was Elijah E. Myers, who also served as the architect for the current Michigan State Capitol in Lansing. The asylum opened its doors five years later, on August 1, 1878, and began treating 222 patients. The original superintendent, Henry Mills Hurd, introduced multiple innovations in psychiatric care, including discouraging restraints, occupational therapy, and recreational activities.

Both the campus size and number of patients slowly grew, as the hospital was repeatedly enlarged between 1882 and 1895 (also designed by Myers), with more additions in 1906, 1914, and 1938. In 1911, the hospital changed its name to Pontiac State Hospital. During the 1950s, the hospital experienced its peak of approximately 3,100 residing patients. The facility was renamed the Clinton Valley Center in 1973, and by the later 1970s the number of patients had declined to around 800.

Due to a decreasing number of patients, the facility was closed in 1997 by the State of Michigan with only 200 patients. The facility was demolished in 2000. A subdivision now occupies the site.

== Description ==
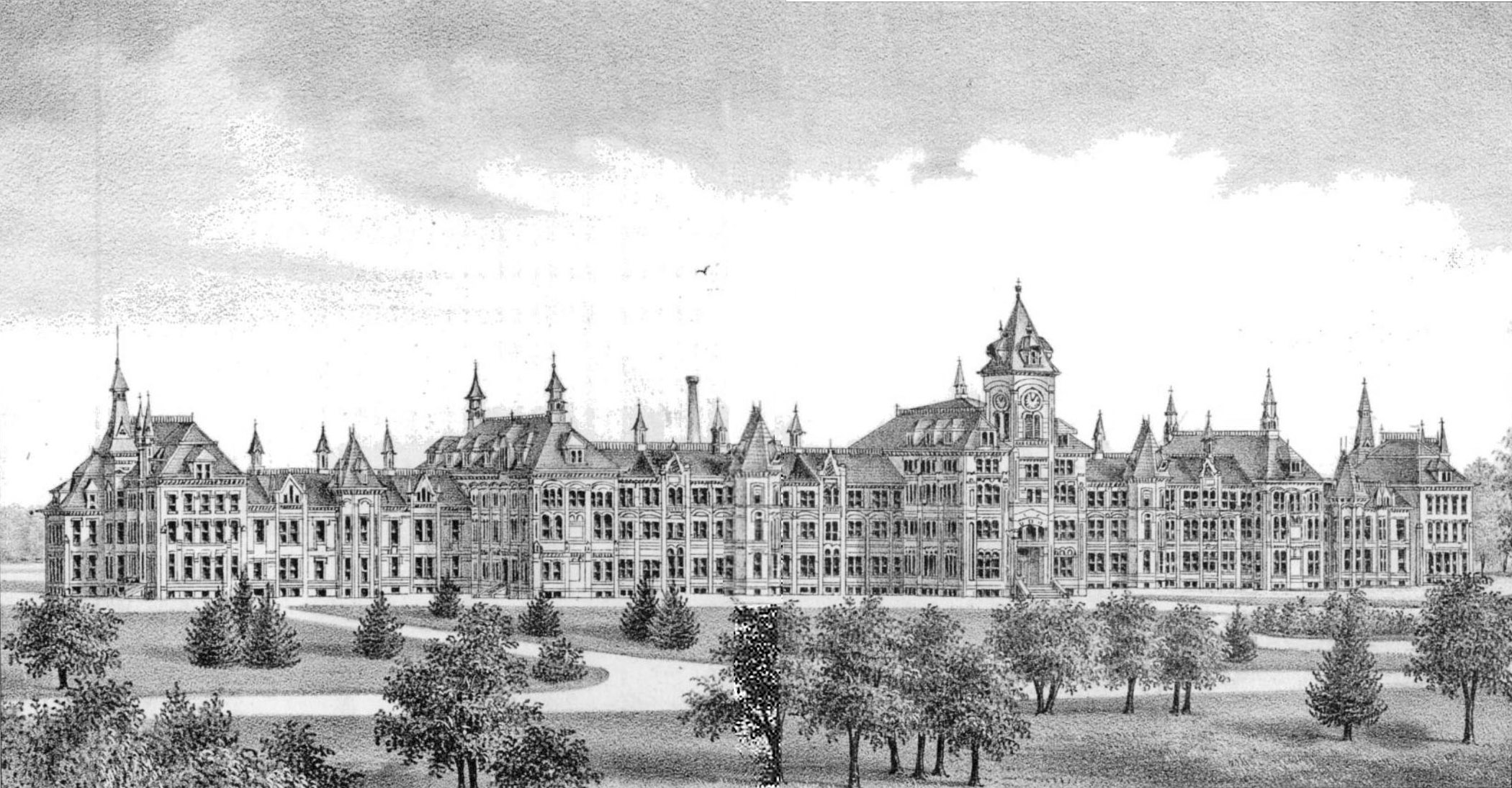
Eastern Michigan Asylum, c. 1876

The campus of the Clinton Valley Center contained 44 structures, many of which were extensions of the original 1878 hospital.

The 1878 structure was a 3 1/2-story red-brick structure with a center building for offices and staff, and two wings for male and female patients. The building had a steeply pitched slate roof with multiple towers, and wood and metal cornices. The building resembled a typical Kirkbride model. The 1882 additions were designed by Charles Anderson to match the original construction. The 1906 and 1914 additions were brick hipped-roof structures, and the 1938 construction added a Tudor designed building onto the front of the structure.

Apart from the main hospital, other structures on the campus included the Vinton Building (1893), the Sawyer Building (1917), the Italian Renaissance chapel (1907) designed by the Detroit firm of Smith, Hinchman and Grylls.

== See also ==
- National Register of Historic Places listings in Oakland County, Michigan
