= Independence State Hospital =

Coordinates: 42.457702°N 91.925919°W

Geography
- Location: Independence, Iowa, United States

Organization
- Type: Specialist

Services
- Speciality: Psychiatric hospital

History
- Former names: Independence Lunatic Asylum, Independence State Asylum, Independence Asylum for the Insane, Iowa State Hospital for the Insane, Independence Mental Health Institute
- Opened: 1873

Links
- Lists: Hospitals in Iowa

The Independence State Hospital, now known as the Independence Mental Health Institute, was built in 1873 as the second asylum in the state of Iowa. It is located in Independence, Iowa. The original plan for patients was to relieve crowding from the hospital at Mount Pleasant and to hold alcoholics, geriatrics, drug addicts, mentally ill, and the criminally insane.

It was built in the style recommended by the Kirkbride Plan. There is also a labyrinth of tunnels which connect every building.

== History ==
After the American Civil War, overcrowding became a problem at the Mount Pleasant State Hospital. Realizing that the need for another asylum in the state of Iowa was growing at a surprising rate, the state commission quickly rallied for another hospital to be built at the city of Independence, Iowa.

The architect was Stephen Vaughn Shipman who also designed the mental institution in Elgin, Illinois; Anna, Illinois; Oshkosh, Wisconsin and Mendota, Wisconsin. Like the Clarinda State Hospital, and the Cherokee State Hospital, changes have been made to the building, but the building looks much like it did in early photographs and postcards.

== Present state ==
The building is still in use as a psychiatric hospital with a drug and alcohol rehabilitation program and as a training school for nurses. Although some areas are now unused, the building has been kept in good shape.

There is a museum in the hospital, called "Days of Yore", which contains relics from its older years. Tours of the institution are open to the public by appointment.
