= Northampton State Hospital =

Historical hospital in Massachusetts

- Commonwealth of Massachusetts

Geography
- Location: Northampton, Massachusetts, United States
- Coordinates: 42°18′39.6″N 72°38′56.4″W

History
- Constructed: 1856
- Opened: 1858
- Closed: 1993

Links
- Lists: Hospitals in Massachusetts
- Northampton State Hospital
- U.S. National Register of Historic Places
- U.S. Historic district
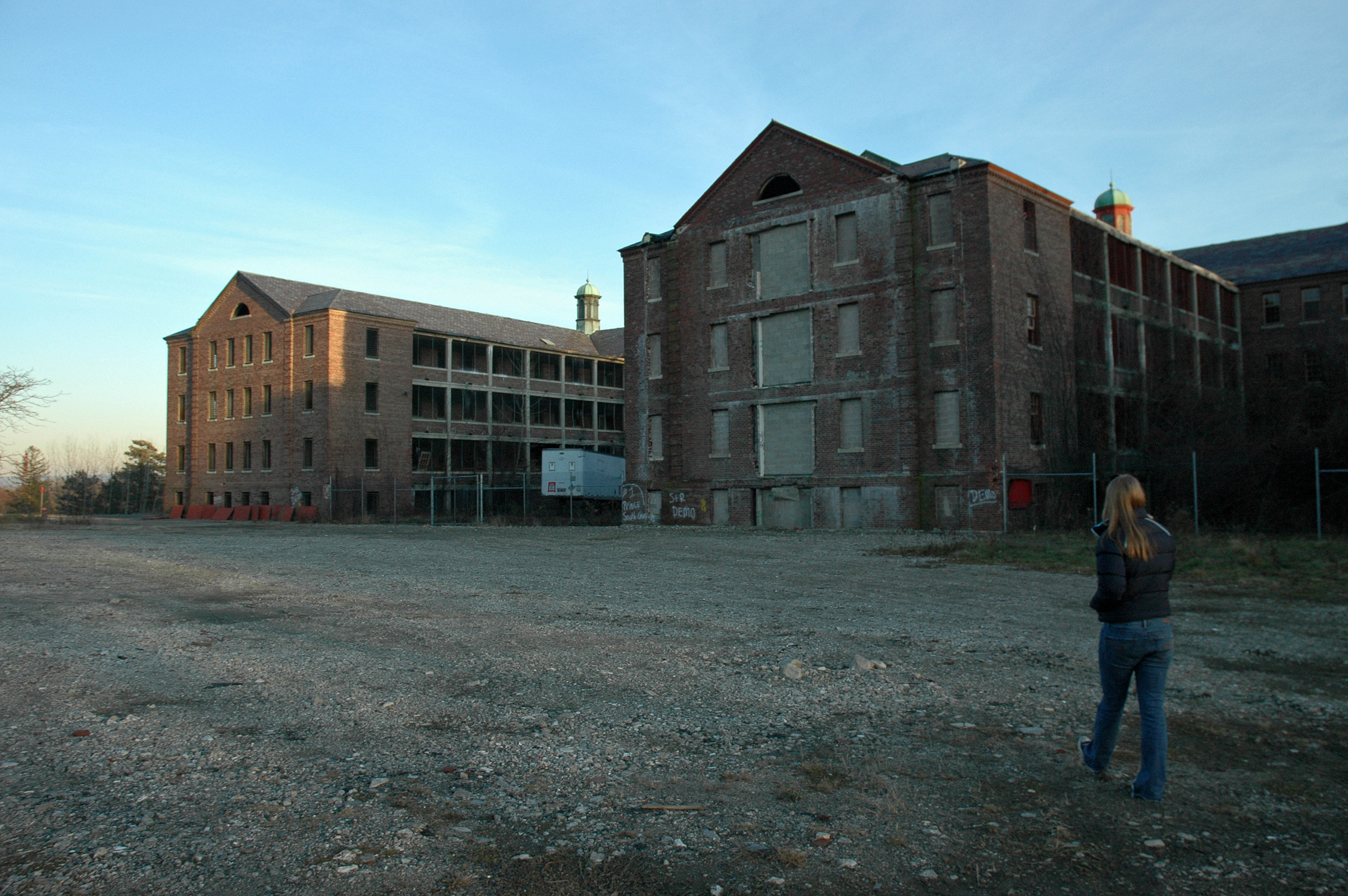
- Hospital grounds in 2007

- Location within Massachusetts Location within the United States
- Location: Northampton, Massachusetts
- Built: 1856
- Architect: Preston, Jonathan; Robb, Gordon
- Architectural style: Late 19th And 20th Century Revivals, Late Victorian, Mid 19th Century Revival
- MPS: Massachusetts State Hospitals And State Schools MPS
- NRHP reference No.: 94000696
- Added to NRHP: July 25, 1994

Northampton State Hospital was a historic psychiatric hospital at 1 Prince Street on top of Hospital Hill outside of Northampton, Massachusetts. The hospital building was constructed in 1856. It operated until 1993, and the building was added to the National Register of Historic Places in 1994.

== History ==
Construction of the State Hospital at Northampton, the third state institution for the insane in the state of Massachusetts began on March 15, 1856, on top of Hospital Hill outside of Northampton, Massachusetts. The hospital was originally known as the Northampton Lunatic Asylum.

On July 4 (United States Independence Day) of the same year the cornerstone was laid. For posterity, a time capsule was embedded within the cornerstone, where it would lie undisturbed on top of Hospital Hill for 150 years. The hospital consisted of Old Main (the original Kirkbride hospital building), and infirmaries, staff dormitories, a work farm, and other buildings including a brand new memorial complex which was established later.

The asylum received its first patients on August 16, 1858. Within six weeks, the population would reach 220, most of whom were transfers from other institutions long overwhelmed. The original design specified a maximum of 200 patients, but this limit was raised to 250 by the statewide hospital Commissioners before the asylum opened. After only two months the Board of Trustees speculated that the limit could be raised to 300 patients. As the patient population accelerated, the wards of Old Main were built onto so much that its original design looked nothing like its new shape. Soon, the population grew so much that several new infirmaries had to be built to sustain the patients.

The first superintendent, Dr. William Henry Prince, resigned in 1864, and Dr. Pliny Earle was selected as his replacement. Dr. Earle immediately began to cultivate a strong work therapy program by expanding the farm, constructing a greenhouse as well as other service-oriented buildings. When he retired in 1885, Dr. Earle was given an apartment within the asylum out of gratitude for his twenty-one years of service. The population had reached 476 patients.

The start of the 20th century was marked with a change in name from the State Hospital at Northampton to the Northampton Insane Hospital, and two years later to Northampton State Hospital. Northampton State Hospital, under superintendent John A. Houston, continued constructing buildings such as large infirmary wards built on either end of the hospital in 1902 and 1903. In 1907, the same year Bishop's Crook lamps were installed around the hospital grounds, “A Mind That Found Itself” was published. In it Clifford W. Beers, a former patient of several institutions, argues that contrary to what the public had been led to believe, no one knew how to cure insanity. That year the population at Northampton stood at 726 patients.

Designed to accommodate 1000 patients, in 1925 work began on the largest expansion of Northampton State Hospital: Memorial Complex. Set apart from the original “Old Main” section of the asylum, Memorial Complex became the focal point for most of the construction, expansions and later operations of Northampton State Hospital, and it allowed the population to swell to more than 2,100 patients in 1935. As the asylum's population became crowded, patients were deported to other hospitals and several small buildings were built around Old Main. Old Main had been expanded upon so much, the original shape of the building no longer resembled a bat wing.

After nearly a century of constant construction, Northampton State Hospital continued to grow. In 1952, the year Thorazine, the first anti-psychotic was introduced, 2,331 patients were served by 509 staff. The Haskell building, which still serves as an office for the Massachusetts Department of Mental Health, was added in 1959.

On January 6, 1978, the United States District Court approved the Brewster Consent Decree, which made clear a patient's constitutional right to treatment in the least restrictive environment possible. Under terms set forth in the Decree, the State Hospital was to reduce the number of patients it served to 50 by 1981. This process would ultimately take 14 rather than 3 years.

In 1980, Northampton State Hospital registered its 64,500th admission, while simultaneously attempting to reduce the total population. Patients were either reassigned to other, usually smaller facilities, or were simply dismissed. Ex-patients entered a largely ignorant and sometimes hostile community; for some, poverty and homelessness were as immediate as the citywide controversy. Debate raged all around Northampton.

After 130 years, Old Main was abandoned in 1986. Operations at Memorial Complex continued until 1993, when the last 12 patients were reassigned, and Northampton State Hospital was officially closed. Once the hospital was closed, conversations began to arise around reuse and preservation of the buildings. Members of the community, including former city councilor Mike Kirby, formed the group Save Old Main, with the mission to restore the Old Main building of the hospital and preserve it for historical purposes. The group led walking tours of the grounds and “talk about the history of the hospital.” Since the hospital played a role in Northampton's history, they believed it should be preserved in some way.

Due to the growing homeless population of Northampton, however, many believed the vacated buildings should be used as a shelter or something of the like. On April 15, 1996, six young activists were arrested for trespassing on the grounds of the hospital. The group, consisting mostly of first-year Hampshire students, attempted an occupation of the Earle Street building with the mission that the building be used as transitional housing for homeless people. Most of the students played roles in their local Food Not Bombs chapters and they all took part in meetings for a local group working to address the homelessness in Northampton, the Next Step Housing Collaborative. Following the arrests, the chief of security for the Northampton State Hospital states that breaking and entering the vacated buildings would bring prosecution.

The community continued to gather in hopes of addressing this issue. A forum was held on September 29, 1996, at the Northampton Center for the Arts and a conference entitled “Our Neighbors: Homeless in the Valley… Why??!!” was held on November 2, 1996, at the Christ United Methodist Church. Short and long terms solutions were brainstormed, some of which revolved around the hospital: “Keep the pressure on to make sure that low-cost housing is developed at the former Northampton State Hospital.”

Despite these efforts and their popularity, city administrators only seriously considered demolition to redevelop the property. In 2006 Old Main was finally demolished, and by the following summer, the Memorial Complex was gone.

In 2007, the city of Northampton adopted a smart growth zoning overlay district covering the grounds of the Northampton State Hospital as part of Massachusetts's "Smart Growth Zoning Overlay District Act" enacted in 2004. The zoning district is designed to promote mixed-use, pedestrian-friendly development, and in 2008, the 40-unit Village Hill development broke ground on the former hospital grounds.

== Memorialization efforts ==
On November 17 and 18, 2000 a series of memorial events took place in Northampton focusing on the history of Northampton State Hospital. The two-day event titled "The State Hospital: In Memoriam" included an academic symposium, an open forum with former patients, and three art exhibitions. The event was sponsored by the Massachusetts Mental Health Center (MMHC) Continuing Education Program and offered continuing education credits to psychologists and nurses in attendance.

The first day of the academic symposium featured the research and experiences of psychiatrists, mental health professionals, and academics from around the United States. An open forum took place the morning of the second day, during which former patients shared stories of their experiences inside the hospital. The event closed with a sound installation at the site of the hospital's Old Main building. The art installation was designed by visual artist Anna Schuleit Haber and intended to reference the events of the laying of the hospital cornerstone in 1856. Attendants of the forum walked in procession to the former hospital grounds. At noon, bells from surrounding churches rang in unison to invoke a communal moment of silence, followed by “Habeas Corpus,” a sound installation in which J.S. Bach's Magnificat, played on installed speakers from inside the empty old main building. The memorial series closed after the end of the 28-minute sound installation.

On October 21, 2017, The Northampton Historical Commission dedicated a new bench in memory to the Northampton State Hospital Burial Ground. The bench overlooks Cemetery Hill, which was used as a burial ground by the hospital until the 1920s. There are 181 confirmed burials for patients who died at Northampton State Hospital, in unmarked graves at this site. The new bench replaced a temporary marker planted at the site since 1959. The new bench is the first step as part of the proposed Northampton State Hospital Walking Tour.

== See also ==
- Belchertown State School
- National Register of Historic Places listings in Hampshire County, Massachusetts
- Titicut Follies
