= Debbie Moon =

English screenwriter and author

- Born: London, England
- Occupations: Screenwriter and author
- Writing career
- Period: 2002–present
- Genres: Fantasy, science-fiction, horror, drama

Debbie Moon is an English screenwriter and author, best known as the creator and show-runner of the CBBC fantasy series Wolfblood.

== Career ==
Moon wrote a screenplay for the low budget science fiction feature The 7th Dimension, and two episodes of the children's series The Sparticle Mystery. Although she published many short stories and some novels early in her career, her break came when she submitted her idea for Wolfblood to the BBC Writers Room, where it was selected as a series. Moon came up with the idea during a visit to a bookshop, saw the words "wolf" in one book title and "blood" in another and blended them together. It ran for five series and was nominated for several awards, winning the Royal Television Society Award for the Children's Drama category in 2013; the Banff Rockie Award in the category for 'Best Children's Programme (fiction)' that same year; In 2015 it won the British Screenwriters' Award in the category 'Best British Children's Television'.

Moon expanded into adult drama with Hinterland. On 10 June 2022 it was announced Moon would adapt the Blue is for Nightmares novels by Laurie Faria Stolarz to television.

== Works ==
=== Filmography ===
Year	Title	Notes	Broadcaster/Distributor
2002	True Love (Once Removed)	Short Film	—N/a
2009	The 7th Dimension	Feature Film	Kaleidoscope
2011	The Sparticle Mystery	Wrote 2 episodes	CBBC
2012–2017	Wolfblood	Creator/Showrunner, wrote 25 episodes	CBBC
2015–2016	Hinterland	Wrote 2 episodes	BBC
2017	Twisted Showcase	"Muscle Memory"	YouTube
2018	Cops and Monsters	Wrote 1 episode	Amazon Prime
2020	Dog Years	Wrote 1 episode	kidoodle.tv
TBA	Sherlock North	Wrote 1 episode	—N/a
TBC	Blue is for Nightmares	Showrunner	—N/a

=== Novels ===
- Falling, Honno Press, 2003, ISBN 1-8702-0661-4

=== Short stories ===
- "Are You Now ...?" in the multi-author collection Premonitions: Different Eerie Warnings, 2004, Pigasus Press

== Awards and nominations ==
Year	Nominated work	Category	Award	Result	Notes	Ref.
2013	Wolfblood	Children's Writer	British Academy Children's Awards	Nominated	—N/a	
2014	Wolfblood	Children's Drama	British Academy Children's Awards	Nominated	—N/a	
2014	Wolfblood	Children's Writer	British Academy Children's Awards	Won	—N/a	
2015	Wolfblood	Children's Drama	British Academy Children's Awards	Nominated	—N/a	
2015	Wolfblood	Best British Children's Television	British Screenwriters' Awards	Won	—N/a	
