= Danvers State Hospital =

Hospital in Massachusetts, US (1878–1992)

- Commonwealth of Massachusetts

Geography
- Location: Danvers, Massachusetts, United States
- Coordinates: 42°34′52″N 70°58′28″W

Organization
- Type: Specialist

Services
- Speciality: Psychiatric

History
- Constructed: 1874
- Opened: 1878
- Closed: 1992
- Demolished: 2006

Links
- Lists: Hospitals in Massachusetts
- Danvers State Hospital
- U.S. National Register of Historic Places
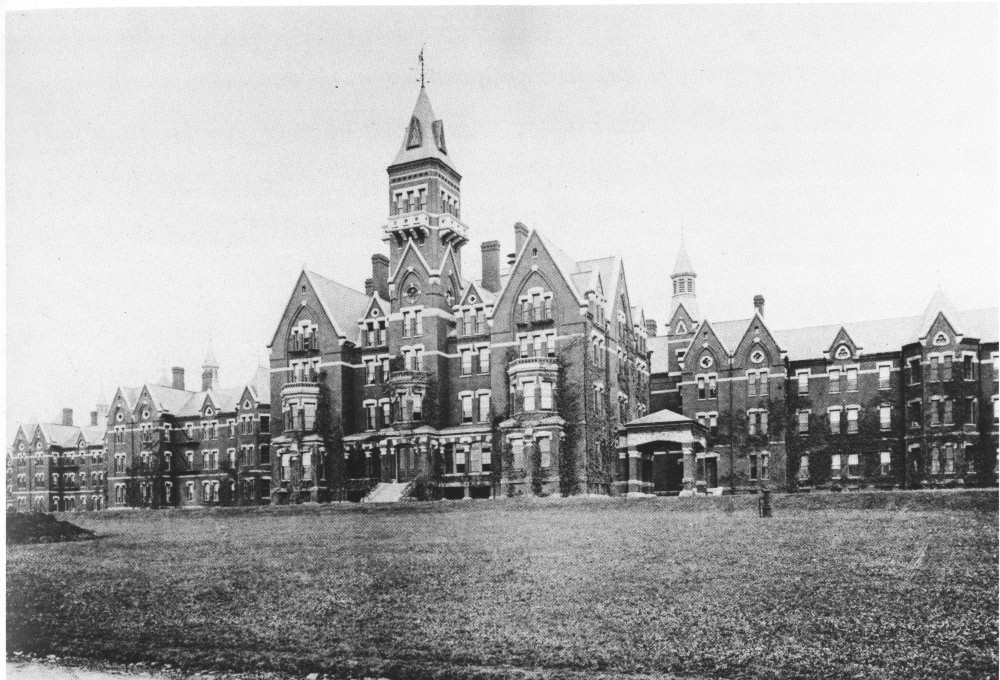
- Danvers State Hospital, c. 1893

- Location within Massachusetts
- Location: Danvers, Massachusetts, United States
- Built: 1874
- Architect: Nathaniel Jeremiah Bradlee
- Architectural style: Neo-Gothic
- NRHP reference No.: 84002436
- Added to NRHP: January 26, 1984

The Danvers State Hospital, also known as the State Lunatic Hospital at Danvers, The Danvers Lunatic Asylum, and The Danvers State Insane Asylum, was a psychiatric hospital located in Danvers, Massachusetts. It was built in 1874 and opened in 1878, under the supervision of prominent Boston architect Nathaniel Jeremiah Bradlee, on an isolated site in semi urban Massachusetts. It was a multi-acre, self-contained psychiatric hospital designed and built according to the Kirkbride Plan.

The hospital was closed permanently in 1992. Despite the building's being included in the National Register of Historic Places in 1984, most of it was demolished in 2007.

== History ==
The Danvers State Hospital was officially opened in 1878 after four years of construction. Nathaniel Jeremiah Bradlee served as the designing architect.

At a cost of $1.5 million at the time, the hospital originally consisted of two main center buildings, housing the administration, with four radiating wings on each side of the Administration Block. The kitchen, laundry, chapel, and dormitories for the attendants were in a connecting building in the rear. Middleton Pond supplied the hospital its water. On each side of the main building were the wings, for male and female patients respectively. The outermost wards were reserved for the most hostile patients.

Over the years, newer buildings were constructed around the original Kirkbride, and alterations were made to the Kirkbride itself, such as a new gymnasium/auditorium on the area of the old kitchens and multiple solaria added onto the front of the wards.

Most of the buildings on campus were connected by a labyrinth of tunnels. Many of the Commonwealth institutions for the developmentally delayed and the mentally ill at the time were designed with tunnel systems, to be self-sufficient in wintertime. There was a tunnel that ran from a steam/power generating plant (which still exists to provide service to the Hogan Regional Center) located at the bottom of the hill running up to the hospital, along with tunnels that connected the male and female nurses homes, the "Gray Gables", Bonner Medical Building, machine shops, pump house, and a few others.

The original plan was designed to house 500 patients, with attic space potentially housing 1,000 more. By the late 1930s and 1940s, over 2,000 patients were being housed, and overcrowding was severe. People were even held in the basements of the Kirkbride.

While the asylum was established to provide residential treatment and care to the mentally ill, its functions expanded to include a training program for nurses in 1889 and a pathological research laboratory in 1895. In the 1890s, Dr. Charles Page, the superintendent, declared mechanical restraint unnecessary and harmful in cases of mental illness. By the 1920s the hospital was operating school clinics to help determine mental deficiency in children. Reports were made that various inhumane shock therapies, lobotomies, drugs, and straitjackets were being used to keep the crowded hospital under control. This sparked controversy. During the 1960s as a result of increased emphasis on alternative methods of treatment, deinstitutionalization, and community-based mental health care, the inpatient population started to decrease.

Massive budget cuts in the 1960s played a major role in the progressive closing of Danvers State Hospital. The hospital began closing wards and facilities as early as 1969. By 1985, the majority of the original hospital wards were closed or abandoned. The Administration Block, in the original Kirkbride building, closed in 1989. Patients were moved to the Bonner Medical Building across the campus.

The entire campus was closed on June 24, 1992, and all patients were either transferred to the community or to other facilities.

== Demolition ==
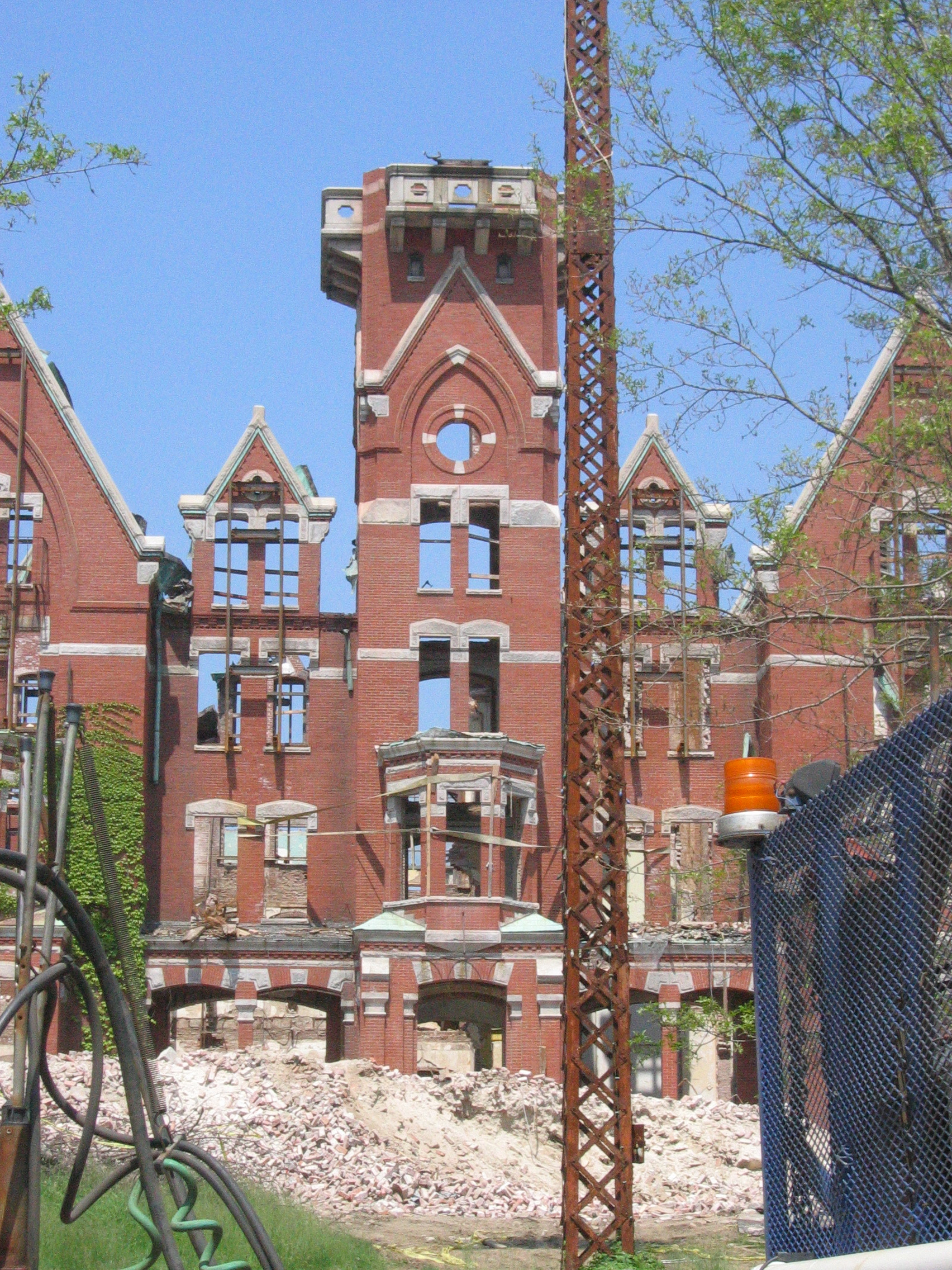
Demolition of administration building.

In December 2005, the property was sold to AvalonBay Communities, a residential apartment developer. A lawsuit was filed by a local preservation fund to stave off the demolition of the hospital, including the Kirkbride building, which was listed on the National Register of Historic Places. This did not stop the process, however, and demolition of most of the buildings began in January 2006, with the intent to build 497 apartments on the 77-acre (310,000 m^{2}) site.

By June 2006, all of the Danvers State Hospital buildings that were marked for demolition had been torn down, including all of the unused buildings and old homes on the lower grounds and all of the buildings on the hill. Demolition was done by Testa Corp. of Wakefield, Massachusetts. The historic Kirkbride was also demolished, with only the outermost brick shell of the administration area (along with the G and D wards on each side) being propped up during demolition and construction while an entirely new structure was built behind and inside of it, leaving the historic Danvers Reservoir and the original brick shell. Much of the wood from the demolition project was salvaged and recycled into flooring and other millwork.

A replica of the original tower/steeple on the Kirkbride was built to duplicate what was removed around 1970, due to structural issues. (The first picture illustrates the original tower in 1893, the second and third pictures illustrate the new replica in 2006 and 2007, and the fourth picture illustrates the one from 1970.) Avalon Bay predicted that they would have properties available for rent or sale by Fall 2007.

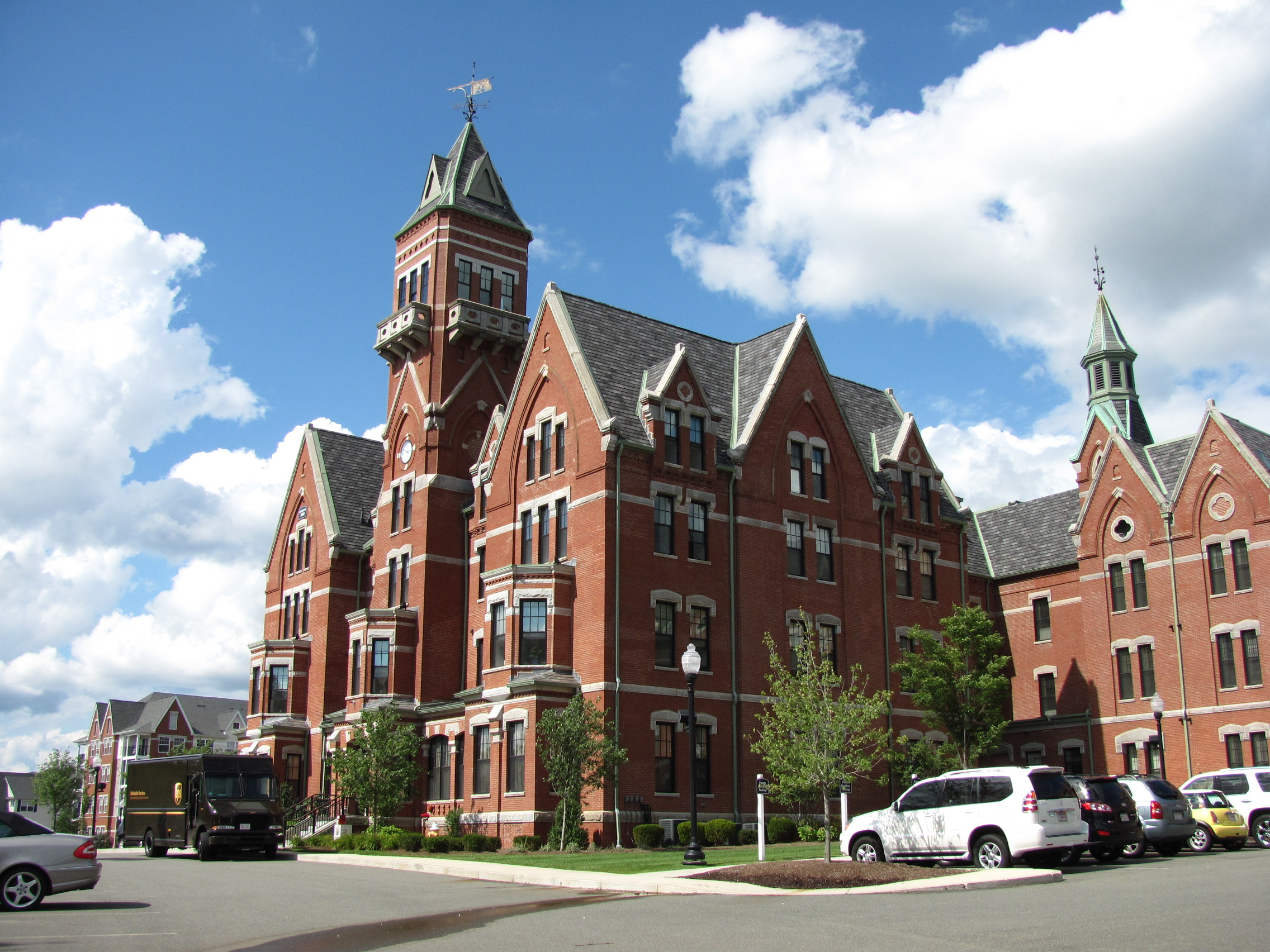
Kirkbride complex of the former Danvers State Hospital, pictured in 2010.

On April 7, 2007, four of the apartment complex buildings and four of Avalon Bay's construction trailers burned down in a large fire visible from Boston, nearly 17 mi (27 km) away. Damage was confined mostly to the buildings under construction on the eastern end, but the remaining Kirkbride spires caught fire due to the high heat.

The tunnel leading up from the power plant still exists, but is blocked at the top of the hill. Only the exterior of the Kirkbride complex was preserved in the demolition, and the cemeteries, several blocked tunnels, and the brick shell of the administration and the D and G wings are all that remain from the original site. Richard Trask of the Danvers Archival Center wrote, concerning the state's failure to preserve the Kirkbride complex, noting:

The failure to protect and adaptively reuse this grand exterior is a monumental blot in the annals of Massachusetts preservation. What might have been a dignified transformation of a magnificent structure which was originally built to serve the best intentions, but at times lost its way through human frailty, now is a mere ghost-image of itself. And we and our progeny are the losers.

On June 27, 2014, Avalon Bay Communities, Inc. sold the property for $108.5 M to the DSF Group. The DSF Group released plans for the property to undergo further renovations.

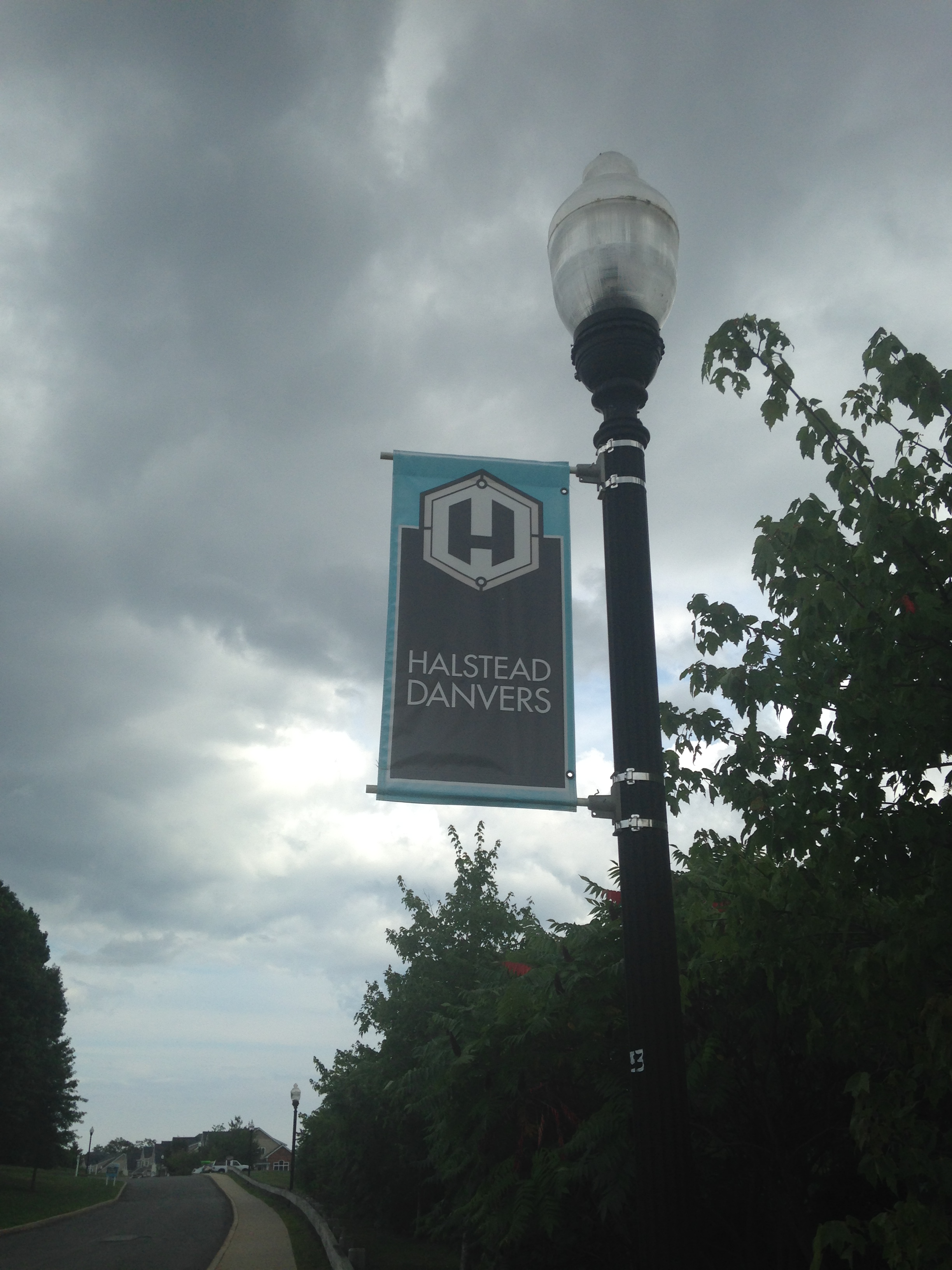
A Halstead Danvers sign

== In popular culture ==
- The Danvers State Hospital is believed by literary historians to have served as inspiration for the infamous Arkham sanatorium from H. P. Lovecraft's "The Thing on the Doorstep". (Lovecraft's Arkham, in turn, is the inspiration for Arkham Asylum, a psychiatric hospital within the Batman universe.) It is referenced by name in the short story "Pickman's Model" and in The Shadow over Innsmouth.
- Parsons State Insane Asylum, in the 2015 video game Fallout 4, takes inspiration from Danvers State Hospital.
- The hospital was the setting for the 2001 horror film Session 9. The asylum was also featured in the 1958 film Home Before Dark.
- In the book Project 17 by Laurie Faria Stolarz, the plot involves six teens breaking into Danvers to investigate.
- In the game Painkiller, one of the levels, called Asylum, is based on the central administration section. While the outside is a faithful reproduction, the inside is not.
- Episode 6 of the podcast Lore, called "Echoes", is dedicated to Danvers.
- The scenario "Genius Loci" for the Call of Cthulhu tabletop role-playing game takes place in Danvers State Hospital.

== Gallery ==
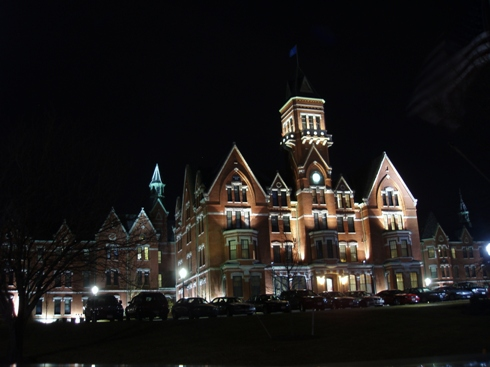
Danvers State Hospital, 2008

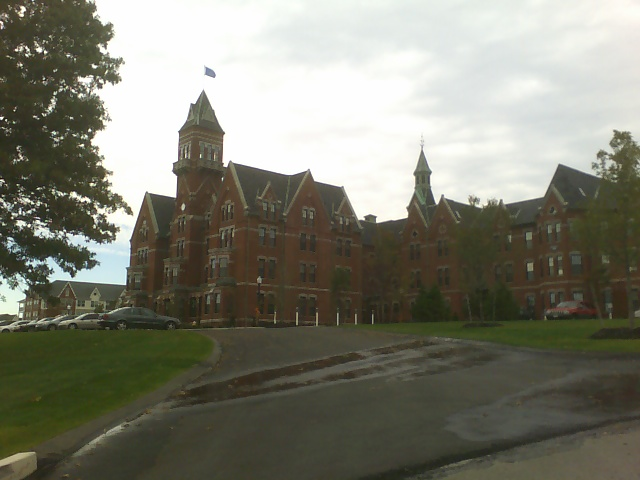
Danvers during the day, October 2007

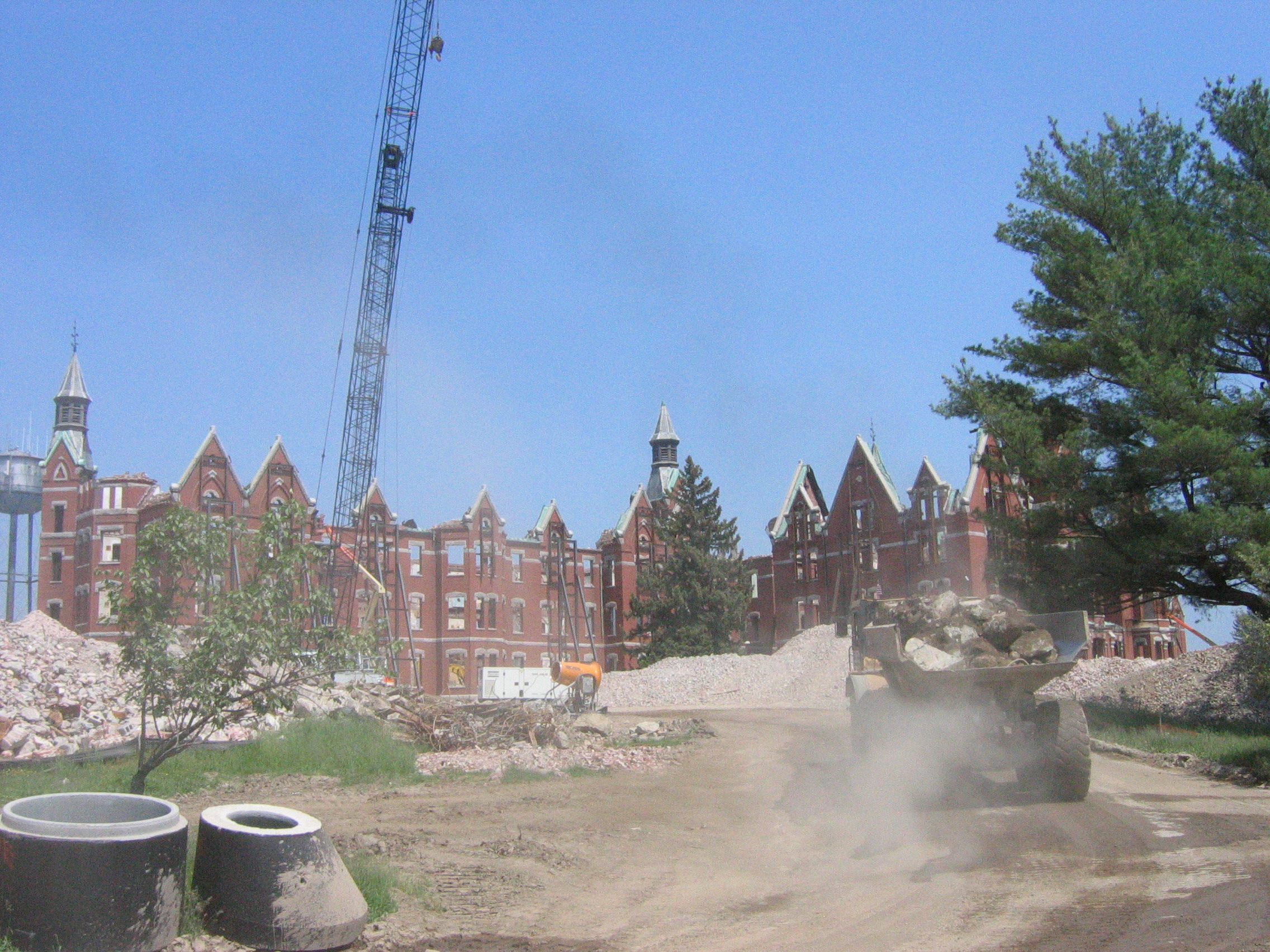
Demolition of hospital

== See also ==
- National Register of Historic Places listings in Essex County, Massachusetts
