= Medical Clinics of North America =

- Discipline: Medicine
- Language: English
- Edited by: Douglas S. Paauw, Edward R. Bollard

Publication details
- Former name(s): Medical Clinics of Chicago
- History: 1915-present
- Publisher: Elsevier
- Frequency: Bimonthly
- Impact factor: 2.455 (2016)

Standard abbreviations
- ISO 4: Med. Clin. N. Am.
- NLM: Med Clin North Am

Indexing
- CODEN: MCNAA9
- ISSN: 0025-7125 (print); 1557-9859 (web)
- LCCN: 17028505
- OCLC no.: 783816343

Links
- Journal homepage

Medical Clinics of North America, also cited as The Medical Clinics of North America, is a bimonthly peer-reviewed medical journal published by Elsevier. Each issue of the journal contains up-to-date review articles on a specific medical topic. The journal was established in 1915 as the Medical Clinics of Chicago, obtaining its current name in 1917. The editors-in-chief are Douglas S. Paauw (University of Washington School of Medicine) and Edward R. Bollard (Penn State Milton S. Hershey Medical Center). According to the Journal Citation Reports, the journal has a 2016 impact factor of 2.455.
