= Clarinda Treatment Complex =

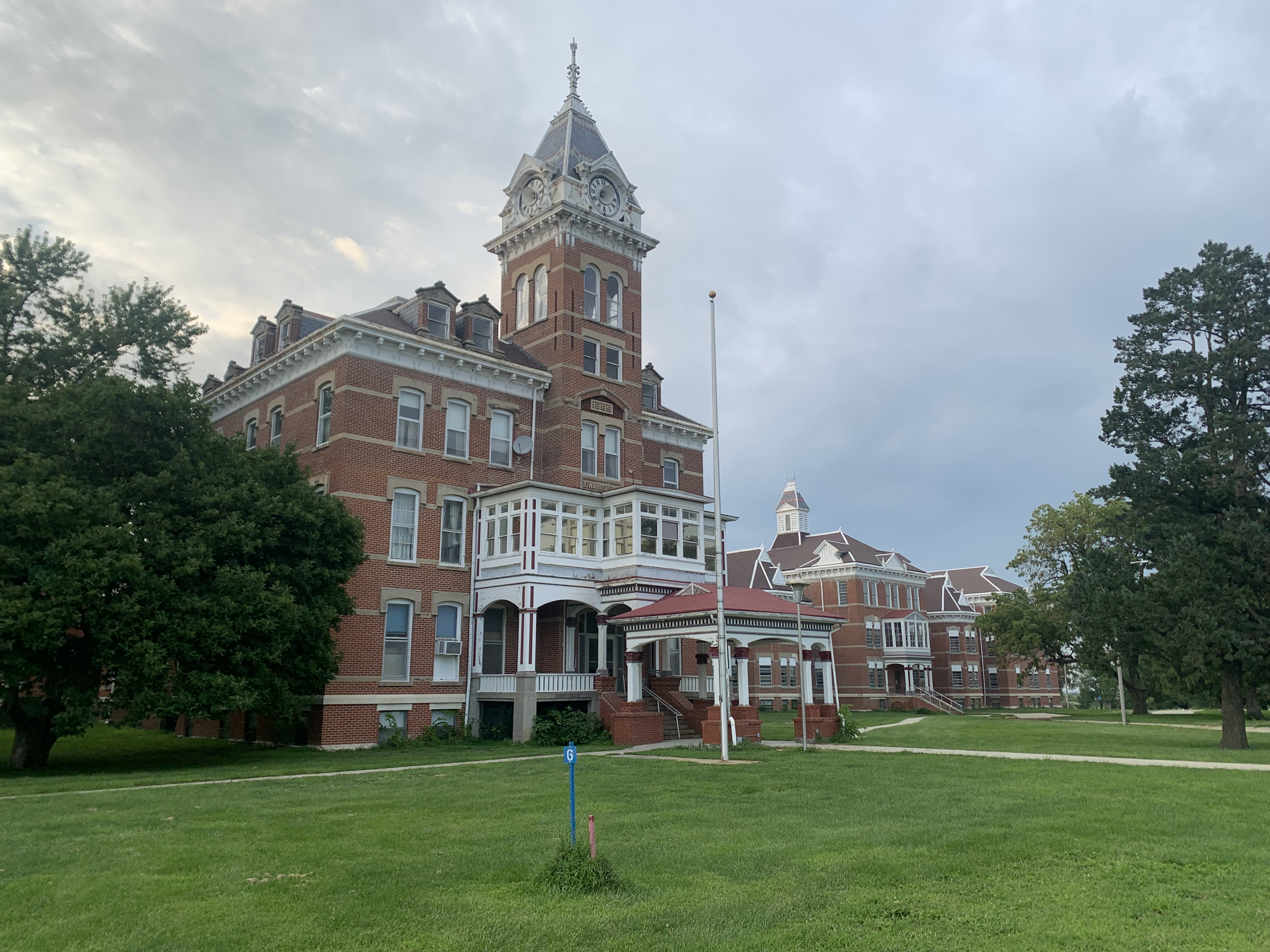
- Building of Clarinda Treatment Complex in northern Clarinda, Iowa

Geography
- Location: Clarinda, Iowa, United States
- Coordinates: 40.757897°N 95.037625°W

Organization
- Type: Specialist

Services
- Speciality: Psychiatric hospital

History
- Opened: 1884
- Closed: June 30, 2015

Links
- Lists: Hospitals in Iowa

The Clarinda Treatment Complex was built in 1884 as the Clarinda State Hospital in Clarinda, Iowa in southwest Iowa. It was the third asylum in the state of Iowa. The hospital's many name variations include: The Clarinda Lunatic Asylum, The Clarinda State Asylum, The Clarinda Asylum for the Insane, and The Clarinda Mental Health Institute. It was built under the Kirkbride Plan. The original plan for patients was to hold alcoholics, geriatrics, drug addicts, mentally ill, and the criminally insane. In 2009, it was made public that, to save money, the state may close one of the four hospitals in Iowa. On June 30, 2015, the hospital facility was shut down and all patient services terminated. The Clarinda Academy, owned by Sequel Youth Services, is the sole occupant of the former hospital grounds.

== Description ==
The Kirkbride is made of red brick with white trim in some areas. The administration section has a large clocktower and is kept in good condition to provide people with an idea of what the mental institution looked like when it was completed in 1886. Although the hospital looks like it did in 1886, the hospital has had many things replaced such as windows. Amenities have also been added such as electricity, running water, and other buildings including infirmaries and a minimum security prison that was established in 1980. Although things have been replaced and added, however, much of the original woodwork and tile floors in the hospital have been kept.

== History ==
Prior to the construction of Clarinda, Iowa had two mental hospitals, in Independence and Mt. Pleasant, but these were overcrowded. Recognizing the need for a third, a state commission selected the city of Clarinda to serve as its home in 1884. William Foster and Henry F. Liebbe of Des Moines were retained as architects for the new facility. Construction began July 4, 1885, and the first patients of the then all-male institution took occupancy in 1888.

The patients at the hospital were thought to be no longer human, and therefore, many were abused, and some even died. The reasons for patient deaths were gruesome lobotomies, improper food and water, starvation and dehydration, abuse, surgeries, extreme climate, and various other forms of treatment.

The former hospital grounds are now home to the CCF.
