= Iowa Department of Corrections =

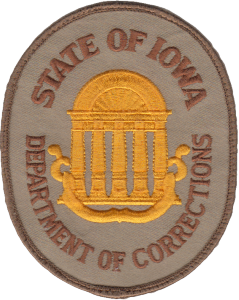

Jurisdictional structure
- Operations jurisdiction: Iowa, USA
- Iowa Prisons — green=state-operated (Hover mouse over pog to popup clickable link)
- Map of Iowa Department of Corrections's jurisdiction
- General nature: Local civilian police

Operational structure
- Headquarters: Des Moines, Iowa
- Agency executive: Beth Skinner, Director

Website
- Official website

The Iowa Department of Corrections is a state agency operating prisons in Iowa, United States. It has its headquarters in Des Moines.

== Facilities ==
The Iowa Department of Corrections operates nine adult facilities through the state. Iowa does not contract with private prisons.

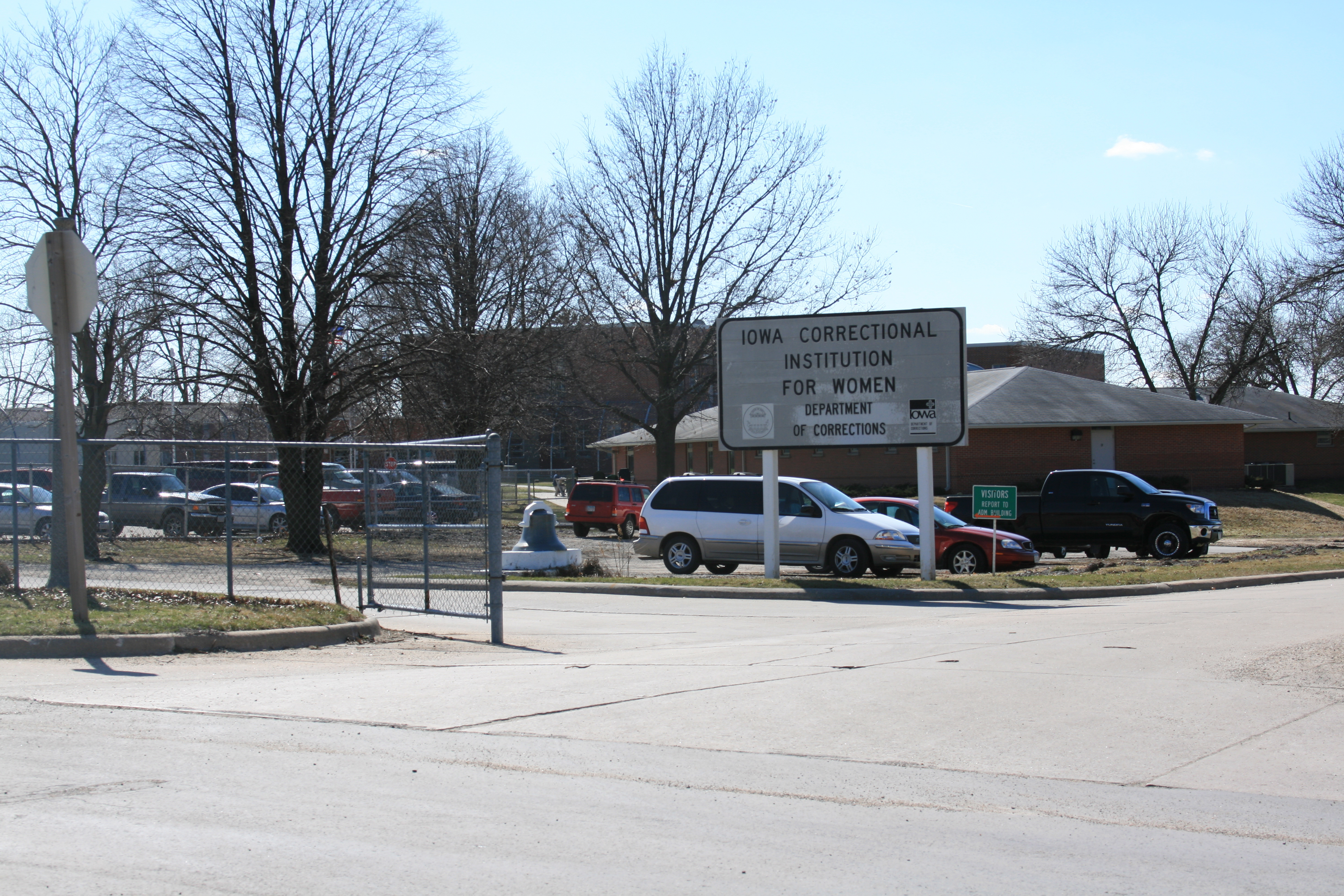
Iowa Correctional Institution for Women

- Anamosa State Penitentiary – Anamosa
- Clarinda Correctional Facility – Clarinda
- Fort Dodge Correctional Facility – Fort Dodge
- Iowa Correctional Institution for Women – Mitchellville
- Iowa Medical and Classification Center – Oakdale
- Iowa State Penitentiary – Fort Madison
- Mount Pleasant Correctional Facility – Mount Pleasant
- Newton Correctional Facility – unincorporated Jasper County, near Newton
- North Central Correctional Facility – Rockwell City

== Fallen officers ==
Since the establishment of the Iowa Department of Corrections, 14 officers have died in the line of duty.

== See also ==
- List of law enforcement agencies in Iowa
- List of United States state correction agencies
- Lists of United States state prisons
- Prison
