= Thomas Mitchell (Iowa politician) =

American politician and farmer (1816–1894)

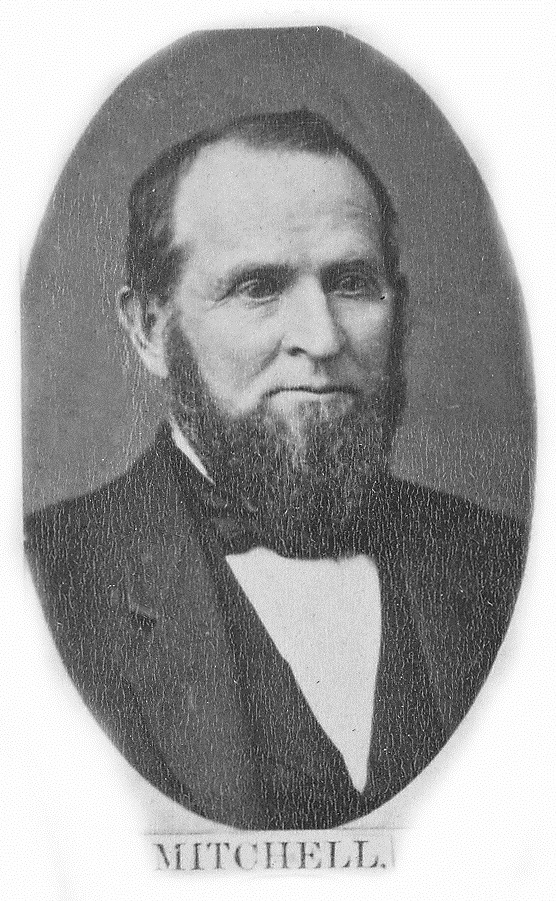
- Mitchell, c. 1876

Member of the Iowa House of Representatives from the 19th district
- In office January 11, 1858 – January 8, 1860
- Preceded by: Andrew J. Kirkpatrick
- Succeeded by: Michael Price

Member of the Iowa Senate from the 28th district
- In office January 12, 1874 – January 13, 1878
- Preceded by: Frank T. Campbell
- Succeeded by: John David Nichols

Personal details
- Born: March 3, 1816 Claremont, New Hampshire, U.S.
- Died: July 15, 1894 (aged 78) Mitchellville, Iowa, U.S.
- Party: Republican
- Other political affiliations: Anti-Monopoly (1874–76)
- Spouse(s): Elvira Swift (m. 1841; died 1860) Anna Mattern (m. 1861–1894)
- Children: 8
- Occupation: Politician, farmer

Thomas Mitchell (March 3, 1816 – July 15, 1894) was an American politician and farmer. A Republican and Anti-Monopolist, he represented the 19th district in the Iowa House of Representatives from 1858 to 1860 and the 28th district in the Iowa Senate from 1874 to 1878. He was the founder of Mitchellville, Iowa, and is considered the first white settler of Polk County, Iowa. An abolitionist, he operated a station on the Underground Railroad and helped establish the Iowa Girls' Industrial School at Mitchellville.

== Early life ==
Mitchell was born on March 3, 1816, in Claremont, New Hampshire, the son of William and Dorothy (née Blake) Mitchell. Mitchell had a younger brother and sister, and was of Scottish and Irish descent. His father died when he was 16, putting strain on the family. He became a farm laborer while receiving a limited education in country schools. In 1836, he began working at a paper mill, and in 1837 began traveling to sell books and paper from the company he worked for.

== Career ==
In 1839, Mitchell moved to St. Charles, Missouri, where he briefly worked on a farm. In 1840 he moved to Iowa and began working at Keosauqua, soon relocating to Fairfield. In 1842, Mitchell was elected county commissioner for Jefferson County. In 1844, he moved to Polk County and was granted a permit from the commanding officer of Fort Des Moines. Mitchell built a log cabin near Camp Creek to service travelers, which was the first house built in Polk County outside of Fort Des Moines. He also began cultivating crops and raised an orchard. He is often regarded as the first permanent white settler of Polk County. In 1846, he claimed 1,080 acres (440 ha) of land in what is now Beaver Township. Mitchell also built the first post office and school in Beaver Township. After the Iowa legislature recognized Polk County, Mitchell was part of a group that campaigned for Fort Des Moines to be the county seat.

The same year, Mitchell was elected the first sheriff of Polk County. In 1848, he ran for the 6th district of the Iowa House of Representatives, but was defeated in the general election by Manly Gifford. He originally was a Whig, but ran as a Republican. In 1857, he was elected to the Iowa House of Representatives from the 19th district, which constituted Polk County, and was a member of the Claims Committee. In 1859, he was elected to the board of supervisors of Polk County, serving as a commissioner for six years. He was an abolitionist throughout his life, being a friend of John Brown, and maintained a station on the Underground Railroad.

In 1867, Mitchell founded the town of Mitchellville, and forbade saloons in the town. In 1873, he was elected to the Iowa Senate from the 28th district as an Anti-Monopolist, which constituted Polk County as well, and was appointed to the Claims, Compensation of Public Officers, Congressional Districts, Normal Schools, Printing, Public Buildings, Reform School, Agricultural College, Appropriations, and Penitentiary committees. He helped to establish the Girls’ Industrial School at Mitchellville, and served on its board of trustees.

== Personal life ==
Mitchell married twice, first to Elvira Swift of Thetford, Vermont, on August 14, 1841, then to Anna Caroline Mattern on June 17, 1861, after Swift's death in 1860. He had four children with his first wife and four more children with his second. He was often called “Uncle Tommy” by those who knew him. He died on July 15, 1894, at his residence in Mitchellville, by natural causes at the age of 78, with over 1,000 people attending his funeral. He was a Universalist by faith. Thomas Mitchell County Park in Polk County bears his name.

Mitchell personally knew Appanoose, Black Hawk, and Chief Poweshiek, and was known to be friends to Native Americans.
