= Correctional Institution for Women =

Correctional Institution for Women may refer to:

Philippines

- Correctional Institution for Women (Mandaluyong) - Metro Manila

United States

- Iowa Correctional Institution for Women
- North Carolina Correctional Institution for Women

See also:

- Kentucky Correctional Institute for Women
- Louisiana Correctional Institute for Women
