= InnerChange Freedom Initiative =

Prison Fellowship International program (1997-present)

The InnerChange Freedom Initiative (IFI) was an American Christian prison program operated by Prison Fellowship International (PFI), a 501(c)(3) nonprofit established by Chuck Colson. The program was closed in 2016.

== History ==
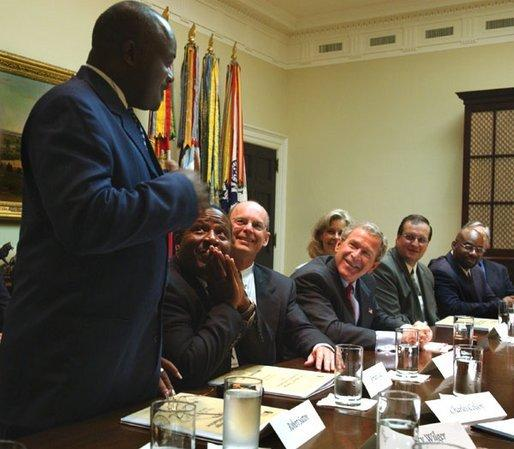
Robert Sutton, an IFI graduate, speaking in the Roosevelt Room in the White House at a roundtable discussion about the program, with President of the United States George W. Bush listening, on Wednesday June 18, 2003

In 1997 the IFI program was introduced to the Carol Vance Unit, a prison in unincorporated Fort Bend County, Texas. Since then, other IFI programs opened at other prisons throughout the United States.

In 2003 the Americans United for Separation of Church and State criticized the implementation of a state-funded IFI program in Iowa, accusing it of violating the United States Constitution's separation of church and state provisions.

The program was closed in 2016.

== IFI program ==
A prisoner's participation in the IFI began 24 to 18 months before his or her scheduled release. Phases one and two occurred during the prisoner's incarceration; phase one concerned what the program referred to as the inmate's "personal values and thought processes and encourages the development of spiritual and moral filters." The program stated that the second phase "tests the inmate's value system in real-life settings and prepares him/her for life after prison. Inmates may spend much of the day in off-site prison work programs or involved in the reentry portion of the IFI curriculum." After release, the prisoner participated in IFI programming for an additional 12 months, with volunteer mentors providing mentoring and support.

The 15-hour days of the participants were dominated by Christian beliefs. Many Bible study sessions were held. For instance the Alcoholics Anonymous meetings directly referred to Jesus instead of using the phrase "higher power." The program considered drug addiction to be a sin instead of a disease. The program told prisoners that homosexuality, masturbation, and premarital sexual intercourse were sins. In order to graduate from IFI, one had to be employed for six months after he was released, as well as meet with a trained local mentor, and attend a pro-social group. Some IFI prisoners were involved in Habitat for Humanity projects.

== University of Pennsylvania study ==
PFI paid the University of Pennsylvania's Center for Research on Religion and Urban Civil Society to conduct a study on the effectiveness of the IFI program in the Carol Vance Unit in Fort Bend County, Texas. The study considered the IFI participants and a control group. 177 prisoners participated in the IFI program, and 75 of those prisoners graduated. In order to graduate, a prisoner was required to continue participating in the program after his release, including complying with the employment requirement. The 102 prisoners who did not graduate either received early parole and did not finish, left the program, or were expelled from the program. The members of the IFI group who had their recidivism rates tracked were released from prison before September 1, 2000. PFI intended for the study to have a favorable result so that the study would assist PFI's efforts to receive federal funding.

The study concluded that the prisoners who graduated from the program had a recidivism rate of 8 percent. The study's control group had a recidivism rate of 20%. The overall State of Texas recidivism rate was 30%. According to the study, as a whole the group who participated in IFI had a higher likelihood of being rearrested than the control group, with 36% arrested within two years, while 35% of the control group was arrested within two years. 24% of all of the IFI participants were reimprisoned, while 20% of the control group was reimprisoned. The study did not track the employment statuses of members of the control group.

=== Interpretation of and reception to the study ===
After the study's release, many media outlets posted articles and editorials favorable to the program. A Wall Street Journal editorial criticized opponents of the program, saying that the critics were "turning a blind eye to science." The editorial stated "the positive findings about the InnerChange Freedom Initiative parallel more than 500 other studies showing that the "faith factor" often makes faith-based programs more effective than their purely secular counterparts."

After the study, the Executive Branch of the Federal Government of the United States under President George W. Bush began to request federal funding for IFI programs from the United States Congress.

Mark A. R. Kleiman, a University of California, Los Angeles professor who studied crime, decided to study IFI. According to Kleiman, when first encountering the study, he stated that he thought "This is interesting. Those look like good recidivism numbers, and good recidivism numbers are hard to find." Upon examining the study, Kleiman concluded that IFI selected prisoners who were already motivated and disciplined and more likely to succeed to participate in the program. Kleiman said that the study "gives you this happy horseshit about the graduates, but if you look at the 'intent to treat,' it's a loser." Kleiman stated that he was not opposed to the IFI program, but that he was opposed to the study.

Kleiman posted an essay critical of the study and the pro-IFI interpretations from the study, "Faith-Based Fudging," at MSN.com. His study is also posted on the Slate website. Kleiman criticized the promoters of the program, saying "Anything that selects out from a group of ex-inmates those who hold jobs is going to look like a miracle cure" and "The InnerChange cheerleaders simply ignored the other 102 participants who dropped out, were kicked out or got early parole and didn't finish. If you select out the winners, you leave mostly losers." Chuck Colson responded to Kleiman's article. Colson accused the article of being an attack against Bush and his promotion of faith-based programs. Scott Nowell of the Houston Press said that "Colson didn't really address Kleiman's argument of selection bias."

Jerry Bryan, a chaplain who participated in the program, said that it would not be fair to consider the people who did not graduate the program in determining whether or not the program is a success. Bryan said "There's a pool of people who don't get anything. That shouldn't count against us. Many offenders volunteer for all the wrong reasons. The most prevalent is 'I'll get more visits.'" Nowell stated that "no one outside the Christian community is making much of an argument with Kleiman's position -- not even the study's author, Byron Johnson. Johnson has declined all media requests since Kleiman's story appeared."

The Houston Press asked Scott Phillips, a Rice University assistant professor of sociology, to examine the Penn study. Phillips concluded that "Considering all participants, IFI does not reduce recidivism. Considering the graduates, IFI leads to a dramatic reduction in recidivism. Is it appropriate to just consider graduates? No." He added, "Even the most rigorous evaluation would probably conclude that IFI has real benefits for the small number of inmates who are both interested in the program and complete the program. But at this point it's impossible to be sure."

Nowell stated that the Christians involved in the IFI program in the Vance Unit support the program and do not regard the results of the study. Kleiman stated that the participants were "not trying to achieve statistical significance, they're interested in individual salvation." Responding to the point, Nowell said "The men who have stuck with InnerChange exhibit an air of calmness and stability not often found in those who've done time in Texas. And there even seems to be a marked difference between the prisoners who have just arrived at InnerChange and those who are about to leave."

== IFI programs by state ==
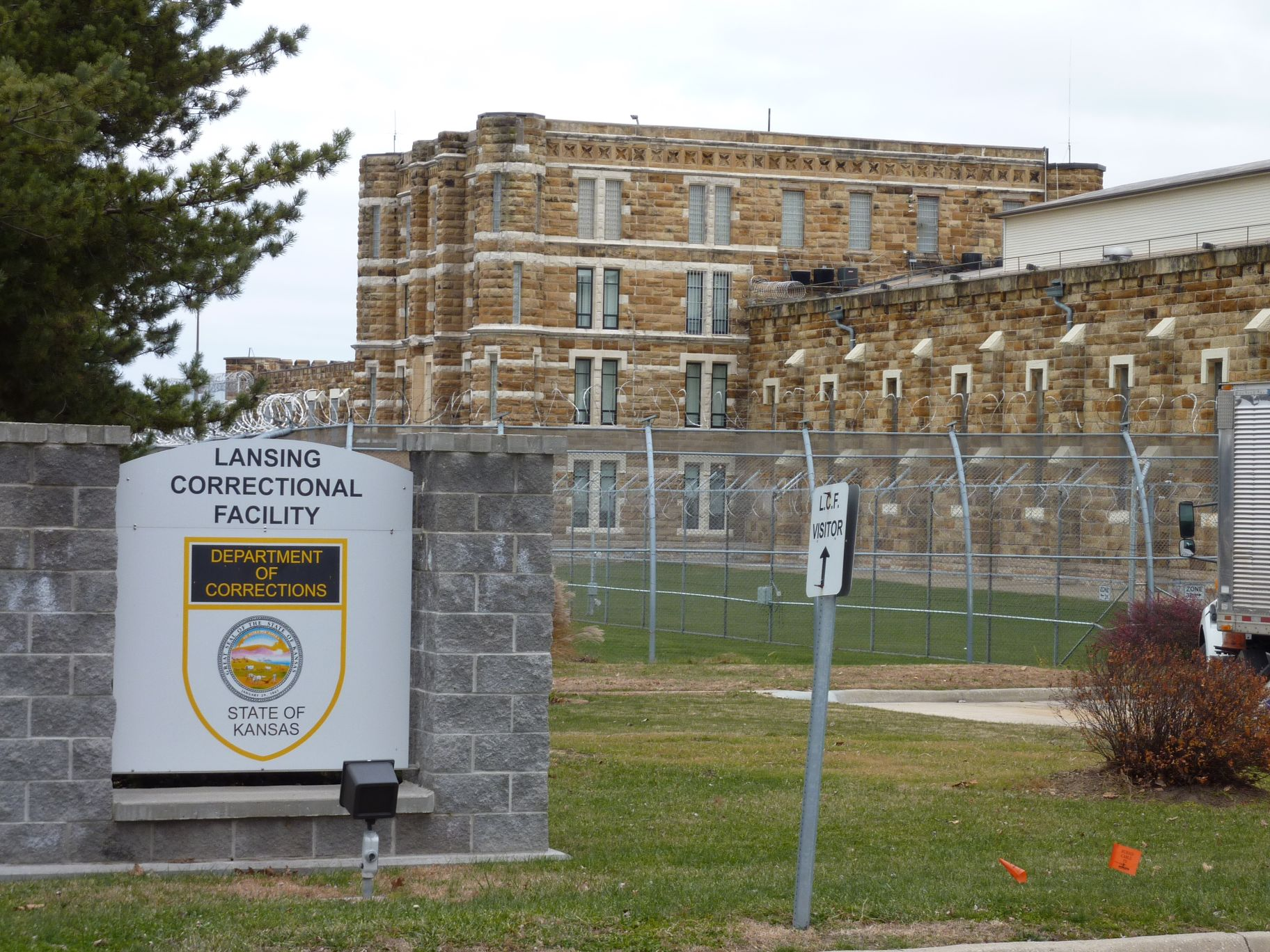
The Lansing Correctional Facility houses the Kansas IFI program

- Minnesota: The program (for men) was in the Lino Lakes Correctional Facility of the Minnesota Department of Corrections
- Texas: The program (for men) was in the Carol Vance Unit of the Texas Department of Criminal Justice.

The program was formerly available in Iowa. The Iowa program was held at the Newton Correctional Facility of the Iowa Department of Corrections.

Three programs were closed during the summer of 2011; Arkansas, Missouri and Kansas. Budget cuts with the parent organization, Prison Fellowship, were cited as the main reason.

- Arkansas: Programs for men and women were in the Hawkins Unit of the Arkansas Department of Correction
- Missouri: The program for men was in the Algoa Correctional Center and the program for women was in the Women's Eastern Reception, Diagnostic and Correctional Center. Both are of the Missouri Department of Corrections.
- Kansas: The program (for men) was in the Lansing Correctional Facility of the Kansas Department of Corrections
