= IMCC =

IMCC may refer to:

- International Minerals and Chemical Corporation - Former mining and production company
- Intrahepatic Mass-forming Cholangiocarcinoma - The most common pathological classification subtype of Intrahepatic Cholangiocarcinoma
- Iowa Medical and Classification Center - A medium security correctional facility located in Iowa
