= Lockdown (2006 TV series) =

- Also known as: America's Hardest Prisons
- Starring: None
- Opening theme: Inmate
- Country of origin: United States
- Original language: English

Production
- Producer: Gail Mitchell
- Running time: 1 hour

Original release
- Network: National Geographic Channel; Channel 5/5Spike (UK)
- Release: 2006 – 2007

Lockdown is a television series appearing on the National Geographic Channel. The series is an educational look into prisons and jails in the United States, presented in a documentary format. Lockdown is known in some regions as America's Hardest Prisons. Reruns of the series currently air on The Justice Network.

== Development ==
Ex-con Larry Lawton was contacted to be a consultant for the show, but didn't accept it because the show didn't allow him to "discuss what really goes on in the prison system."

== Episodes ==
=== Season 1 ===
No.	Title	Directed by	Original release date
1	"Gangland"	TBD	2007
For the most violent, powerful, and infamous inmates, this is the last stop in prison purgatory: Pelican Bay State Prison, California. For two decades it’s been at the heart of California’s war on one of the greatest scourges in America—prison gangs. The facility houses the state's most violent offenders, and is populated by numerous gang members. Once inside, supporters of organizations including the Nazi Low Riders and the Black Guerillas continue to wage war on each other. However, the authorities are determined to destroy the leaders' communication networks and foster an environment that will encourage informants to emerge.
2	"Predators Behind Bars"	TBD	2007
The National Geographic Channel takes you inside Ohio’s Lebanon Correctional Institution. A new inmate and a new officer are thrown into a mix of nearly 2,200 of the state’s most dangerous and conniving criminals.Gang leader Diedreikus Albert reveals how convicts get their hands on contraband behind bars in Ohio's Lebanon Correctional Institution, which contains more than 2,000 of the state's most dangerous men. Plus, a new inmate who is serving seven years for involuntary manslaughter shares his fears and a 23-year-old who is about to be sworn in as a correctional officer talks about the challenges of the job.
3	"Inside Maximum Security"	TBD	2007
Go inside one of the country’s most secure prisons: Oak Park Heights Supermax. Built partially underground, this state-of-the-art fortress houses criminals other prisons can’t handle. Despite cutting-edge technology, the inmates put the prison to the test.
4	"Gang War"	TBD	2007
National Geographic brings you firsthand accounts from inmates and correctional officers in a prison where gang leaders have the upper hand and call the shots. At Salinas Valley State Prison in Soledad, California, there are nearly 200 gang-related attacks each year. An estimated 70% of inmates were gang members on the outside and mergers take place to form racial armies. Mass battles take place in the violent C yard, inhabited by leaders who order assaults, riots and murders to be carried out by 'foot soldiers'
5	"Women Behind Bars"	TBD	2007
Explore the Valley State Prison in Chowchilla, California, a penal complex that has all the hallmarks of a maximum-security prison—violent inmates, overcrowding and a drug trade—but with a unique population: it houses 3,900 violent female offenders.
6	"Total Control"	TBA	TBA
Go inside one of the newest high-tech maximum-security prisons in the United States—Alexander Correctional Institution in Taylorsville, North Carolina. In this prison, which has earned the nickname "hell" from inmates, see how officers use sophisticated technology—and unconventional methods—to keep a "choke hold" on its violent prisoners. National Geographic uncovers the secrets behind this penitentiary and demonstrates how it has been specifically built to prevent any kind of inmate escape attempts.

=== Season 2 ===
No.	Title	Directed by	Original release date
7	"Gang vs Family"	TBD	2007
National Geographic Channel takes you inside the Utah State Prison—home to 4,000 of the state's most dangerous criminals—to show how inmates put their gang first, no matter the cost, even if it results in losing child custody of their children. See firsthand how a female inmate—with her parole just weeks away—struggles with competing desires of being faithful to her gang and raising her 3-year-old daughter.
8	"Newbies"	TBD	2007
At the Wyoming State Penitentiary (WSP), 30 new correctional officers have one thing in common: none of them have ever worked in a prison before. WSP is chronically and dangerously, understaffed—even the inmates know how dire the situation is. To find new officers, the prison went recruiting in states rife with unemployment. The COs moved to Wyoming for a job. Now, NGC follows three rookies, including a recent college graduate, a former U.S. Marine, and a 27-year-old mother of two.
9	"Tent City"	TBA	TBA
Phoenix, Ariz., has one of the largest jail systems in the country, with inmates outnumbering prison cells. To deal with the overflow, the sheriff's office created Tent City on the edge of town. Tent City houses 2,000 inmates in Korean War-era tents. More than 20 felons share a single tent with more arriving every day. Temperatures inside the tents can reach 135 degrees during the summer. Witness firsthand what life is like for inmates and officers in this heated environment.
9	"Inmate University"	TBD	2007
Imagine trying to study while surrounded by murders, rapists and those who have performed unthinkable acts. At the Ironwood State Prison in California a group of inmates face this challenge on a daily basis while participating in a college education program founded and run by inmates. In Lockdown, inmates provide firsthand accounts of how important it is for them to graduate from "Inmate U," despite facing stiff opposition from their gangs and frequent prison-wide lockdowns.
10	"First Timers"	TBD	2007
Inside the Iowa Fort Dodge Correctional Facility and the Rivers Program to show a look at prison though the eyes of new inmates that have not been before, and a program trying to stop repeat offenders.
