= Mitchellville, Iowa =

- City
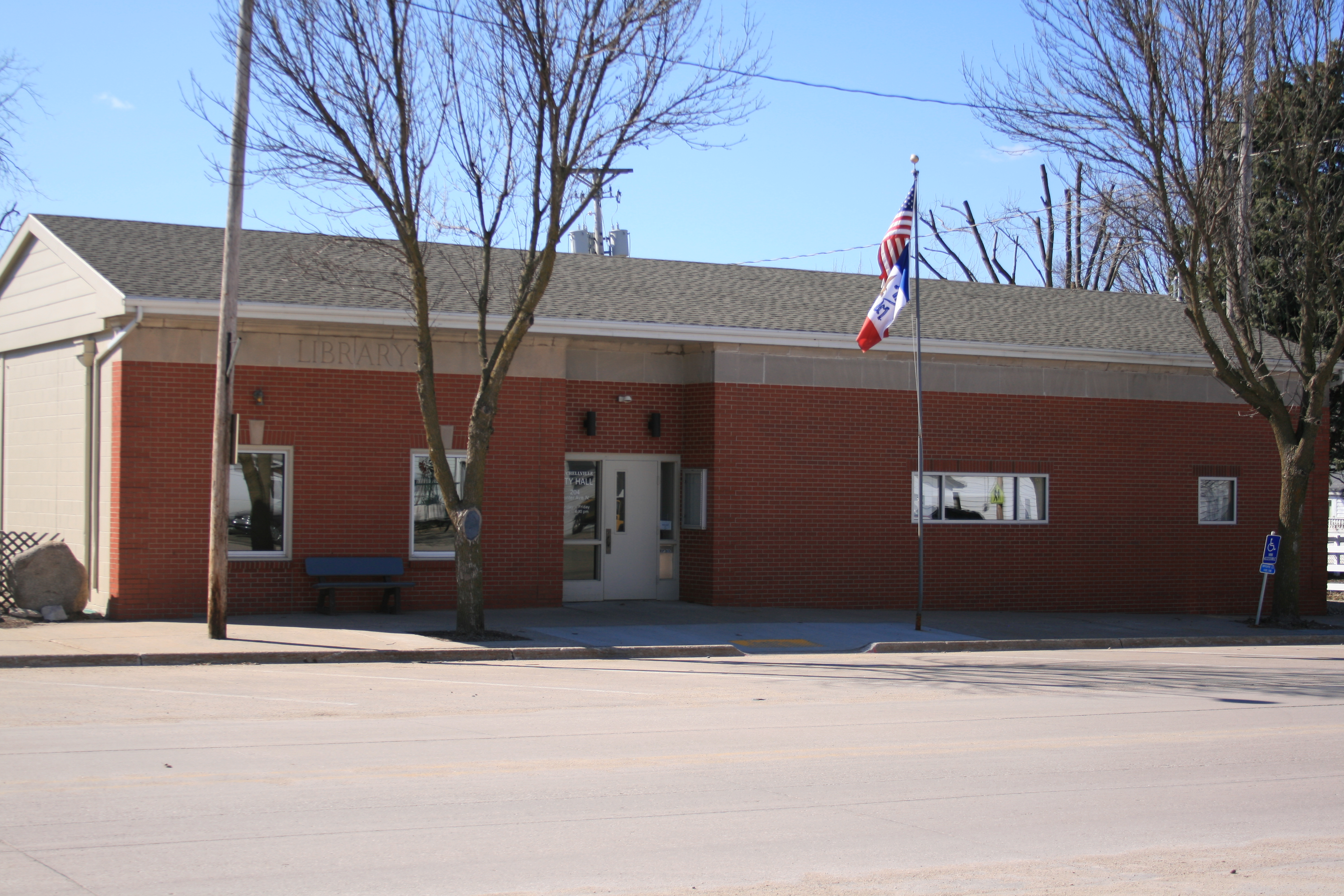
- Mitchellville City Hall

- Logo

- Location of Mitchellville, Iowa
- Coordinates: 41°40′06″N 93°21′58″W
- Country: United States
- State: Iowa
- Counties: Polk, Jasper
- Townships: Beaver (Polk County), Washington (Jasper County)
- Established: 1856
- Incorporated: September 30, 1875
- Named for: Thomas Mitchell

Government
  - Mayor: Tony Jensen

Area
  - Total: 2.53 sq mi (6.55 km^{2})
  - Land: 2.52 sq mi (6.53 km^{2})
  - Water: 0.0039 sq mi (0.01 km^{2})
- Elevation: 955 ft (291 m)

Population (2020)
  - Total: 2,485
  - Density: 985.2/sq mi (380.37/km^{2})
- Time zone: UTC-6 (Central (CST))
  - Summer (DST): UTC-5 (CDT)
- ZIP code: 50169
- Area code: 515
- FIPS code: 19-52950
- GNIS feature ID: 2395360
- Website: www.mitchellville.org

Mitchellville is a city located in Polk and Jasper counties in the U.S. state of Iowa. The population was 2,485 at the time of the 2020 census.

Mitchellville is part of the Des Moines–West Des Moines Metropolitan Statistical Area.

The Iowa Correctional Institution for Women is located in Mitchellville.

== History ==
Mitchellville was founded by Thomas Mitchell (1816–1894) in 1856 and it incorporated as a city on September 30, 1875. Mitchell's farm was later purchased by Polk County, becoming Thomas Mitchell Park. Mitchell was the first white settler in Polk County, Iowa.

== Geography ==
According to the United States Census Bureau, the city has a total area of 2.34 square miles (6.06 km^{2}), of which 2.33 square miles (6.03 km^{2}) is land and 0.01 square miles (0.03 km^{2}) is water.

== Demographics ==
Historical populations
Year	Pop.	±%
1880	745	—
1890	704	−5.5%
1900	768	+9.1%
1910	869	+13.2%
1920	752	−13.5%
1930	702	−6.6%
1940	769	+9.5%
1950	906	+17.8%
1960	957	+5.6%
1970	1,341	+40.1%
1980	1,530	+14.1%
1990	1,670	+9.2%
2000	1,715	+2.7%
2010	2,254	+31.4%
2020	2,485	+10.2%
Source:"U.S. Census website". United States Census Bureau. and Iowa Data Center; Source: U.S. Decennial Census

=== 2020 census ===
As of the 2020 census, Mitchellville had a population of 2,485, with 660 households and 443 families. The median age was 37.3 years. 17.3% of residents were under the age of 18 and 12.0% were 65 years of age or older. For every 100 females, there were 52.0 males, and for every 100 females age 18 and over, there were 45.7 males.

The population density was 985.2 inhabitants per square mile (380.4/km^{2}). There were 711 housing units at an average density of 281.9 per square mile (108.8/km^{2}), of which 7.2% were vacant. The homeowner vacancy rate was 3.1% and the rental vacancy rate was 12.5%.

0.0% of residents lived in urban areas, while 100.0% lived in rural areas.

Of the 660 households, 32.9% had children under the age of 18 living in them, 51.5% were married-couple households, 8.8% were cohabitating couples, 18.6% had a male householder with no spouse or partner present, and 21.1% had a female householder with no spouse or partner present. About 32.9% of households were non-families, 25.6% were made up of individuals, and 11.0% had someone living alone who was 65 years of age or older.

The age distribution was 18.9% under 20, 6.4% from 20 to 24, 37.5% from 25 to 44, and 25.3% from 45 to 64.

Racial composition as of the 2020 census
Race	Number	Percent
White	2,196	88.4%
Black or African American	120	4.8%
American Indian and Alaska Native	44	1.8%
Asian	11	0.4%
Native Hawaiian and Other Pacific Islander	3	0.1%
Some other race	32	1.3%
Two or more races	79	3.2%
Hispanic or Latino (of any race)	102	4.1%

=== 2010 census ===
As of the census of 2010, there were 2,254 people, 651 households, and 430 families living in the city. The population density was 967.4 inhabitants per square mile (373.5/km^{2}). There were 693 housing units at an average density of 297.4 per square mile (114.8/km^{2}). The racial makeup of the city was 91.7% White, 5.8% African American, 0.8% Native American, 0.5% Asian, 0.2% from other races, and 1.0% from two or more races. Hispanic or Latino of any race were 2.4% of the population.

There were 651 households, of which 35.3% had children under the age of 18 living with them, 53.0% were married couples living together, 9.4% had a female householder with no husband present, 3.7% had a male householder with no wife present, and 33.9% were non-families. 27.5% of all households were made up of individuals, and 9.1% had someone living alone who was 65 years of age or older. The average household size was 2.53 and the average family size was 3.12.

The median age in the city was 37.2 years. 20.4% of residents were under the age of 18; 8.8% were between the ages of 18 and 24; 35.2% were from 25 to 44; 25.3% were from 45 to 64; and 10.2% were 65 years of age or older. The gender makeup of the city was 36.5% male and 63.5% female.

The 2010 census includes the prisoners of the Iowa Correctional Institution for Women, whereas the 2000 census did not. This accounts for the drastic change in male/female ratio between 2000 and 2010.

=== 2000 census ===
As of the census of 2000, there were 1,715 people, 650 households, and 455 families living in the city. The population density was 746.4 inhabitants per square mile (288.2/km^{2}). There were 675 housing units at an average density of 293.8 per square mile (113.4/km^{2}). The racial makeup of the city was 97.49% White, 0.29% African American, 0.12% Native American, 0.70% Asian, 0.41% from other races, and 0.99% from two or more races. Hispanic or Latino of any race were 1.34% of the population.

There were 650 households, out of which 39.4% had children under the age of 18 living with them, 55.7% were married couples living together, 10.8% had a female householder with no husband present, and 30.0% were non-families. 25.5% of all households were made up of individuals, and 10.8% had someone living alone who was 65 years of age or older. The average household size was 2.55 and the average family size was 3.09.

28.9% are under the age of 18, 7.9% from 18 to 24, 29.5% from 25 to 44, 20.0% from 45 to 64, and 13.6% who were 65 years of age or older. The median age was 35 years. For every 100 females, there were 95.6 males. For every 100 females age 18 and over, there were 87.0 males.

The median income for a household in the city was $45,250, and the median income for a family was $52,113. Males had a median income of $34,327 versus $26,202 for females. The per capita income for the city was $18,572. About 4.3% of families and 4.6% of the population were below the poverty line, including 4.9% of those under age 18 and 7.5% of those age 65 or over.

== Economy ==
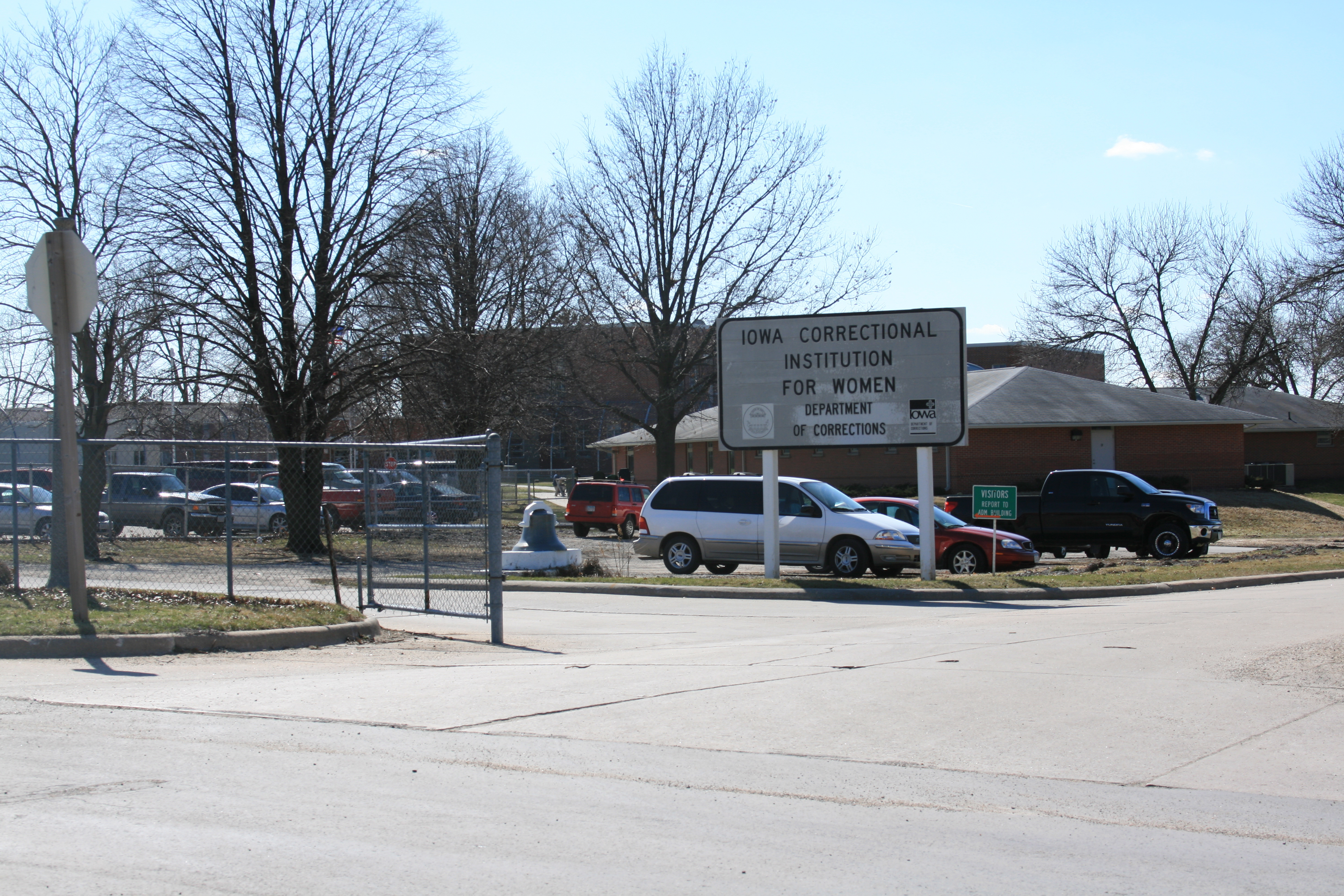
Iowa Correctional Institution for Women

The Iowa Department of Corrections Iowa Correctional Institution for Women is in Mitchellville.

== Education ==
Mitchellvile is with the Southeast Polk Community School District. K-5 attend Mitchellville Elementary.

== Notable people ==
- Clair Cameron Patterson (1922–1995), geochemist who determined the age of the Earth and discovered significant lead contamination from industry
- Lawrence Timothy "Buck" Shaw (1899–1977) was an American football player and coach. Among others, he was the head coach for the San Francisco 49ers, the United States Air Force Academy and the Philadelphia Eagles. He attended the University of Notre Dame, where he became a star player on Knute Rockne's first unbeaten team.
- J. J. Stiffler (1934–2019), electrical engineer and computer scientist

== See also ==
- Universalist Church, listed on the National Register of Historic Places
- KKSO (FM), radio station
