= Mount Pleasant Correctional Facility =

Prison in Iowa, United States

Coordinates: 40°57′21″N 91°32′10″W

- Interactive map of Mount Pleasant Correctional Facility
- Location: 1200 E Washington Street Mount Pleasant, Iowa
- Status: open
- Security class: mixed (co-ed)
- Capacity: 982
- Managed by: Iowa Department of Corrections

The Mount Pleasant Correctional Facility (MPCF) is an Iowa Department of Corrections correctional institution located in Mount Pleasant, Iowa, United States. As of 30 July 2010, the institution has 1100 inmates and another 44 in segregation in a 775-inmate facility. The facility has about 340 staff members.

The MPCF primarily houses inmates with treatable personality disorders and substance abuse problems. The facility specializes in treating sex offenders and those having substance abuse problems. Additionally the facility works to help inmates transition to life on the outside. The correctional facility is located on the same campus as the Mount Pleasant Mental Health Institute.

== See also ==
- List of Iowa state prisons
