= Newton Correctional Facility =

Low and medium security facility in the Iowa Department of Corrections

Coordinates: 41.628°N 93.056°W

- Interactive map of Newton Correctional Facility
- Location: Newton, Iowa
- Status: open
- Security class: low / medium
- Capacity: 1050
- Managed by: Iowa Department of Corrections

The Newton Correctional Facility is a low and medium security correctional institution of the Iowa Department of Corrections. It is located in Palo Alto Township, in unincorporated Jasper County, Iowa, near Newton. Currently the institution has 265 staff members and about 1,300 inmates.

The facility houses the Correctional Release Center - a low security unit that prepares inmates in the Iowa correctional system for parole, work release, or discharge. The center trains inmates about to be released in release preparation, challenging criminal thinking, and substance abuse treatment. The center's programs place emphasis on the need for such inmates to accept responsibility for their actions. The substance abuse program not only prepares inmates for release, but it also provides treatment for parolees and work release people who have developed substance abuse issues. The facility offers adult basic education, GED services, and special education.

Inmates are assigned to both inside and outside work. The outside work can be community service based work in state agencies, or private sector employment.

The InnerChange Freedom Initiative was formerly available in this facility.

== See also ==
- List of Iowa state prisons
