= Lisle Corporation =

American automotive tool manufacturer

- Type: Private
- Industry: Manufacturing
- Founded: 1903
- Founder: C.A. Lisle
- Headquarters: Clarinda, Iowa
- Products: Automotive tools
- Website: www.lislecorp.com

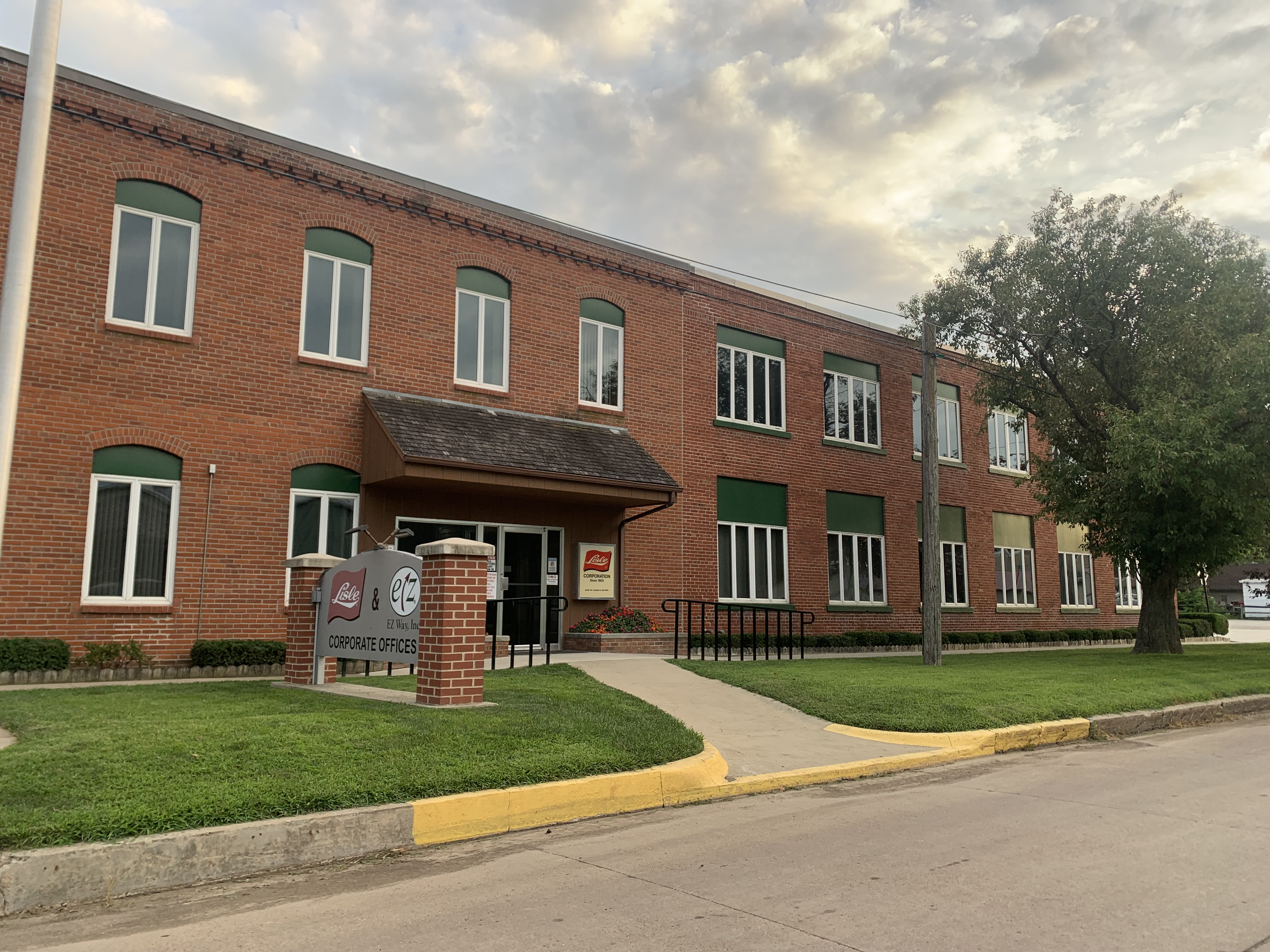
Lisle Corporation headquarters in Clarinda, Iowa

Lisle Corporation is an American manufacturer of auto mechanic's specialty tools. It is an independent, private corporation that has been operated in Clarinda, Iowa by members of the Lisle family since its founding in 1903.

The company manufactures more than 400 different automotive tools and related items, including the Jeepers Creepers line of mechanic's creepers, and its products are sold at US retailers, including Carquest Auto Parts and Sears.

== History ==
Lisle was founded in 1903 by C.A. Lisle, originally manufacturing horse-powered well-drilling machines.

Lisle's product for the automotive market was an aftermarket master vibrator for the Ford Model T engine, replacing the engine's four trembler coils with a cheaper and more easily adjusted single unit. It then introduced its first tool, an engine valve refacer, a type of lathe for reshaping a cylinder head's valve seats.

In the 1930s, the company added a line of magnetic oil pan drain plugs, which were used by the military in World War II. In 1943, the company was one of several to win the Army-Navy "E" Award. After the war, the company began to focus on specialty automotive tools.

== Gallery ==
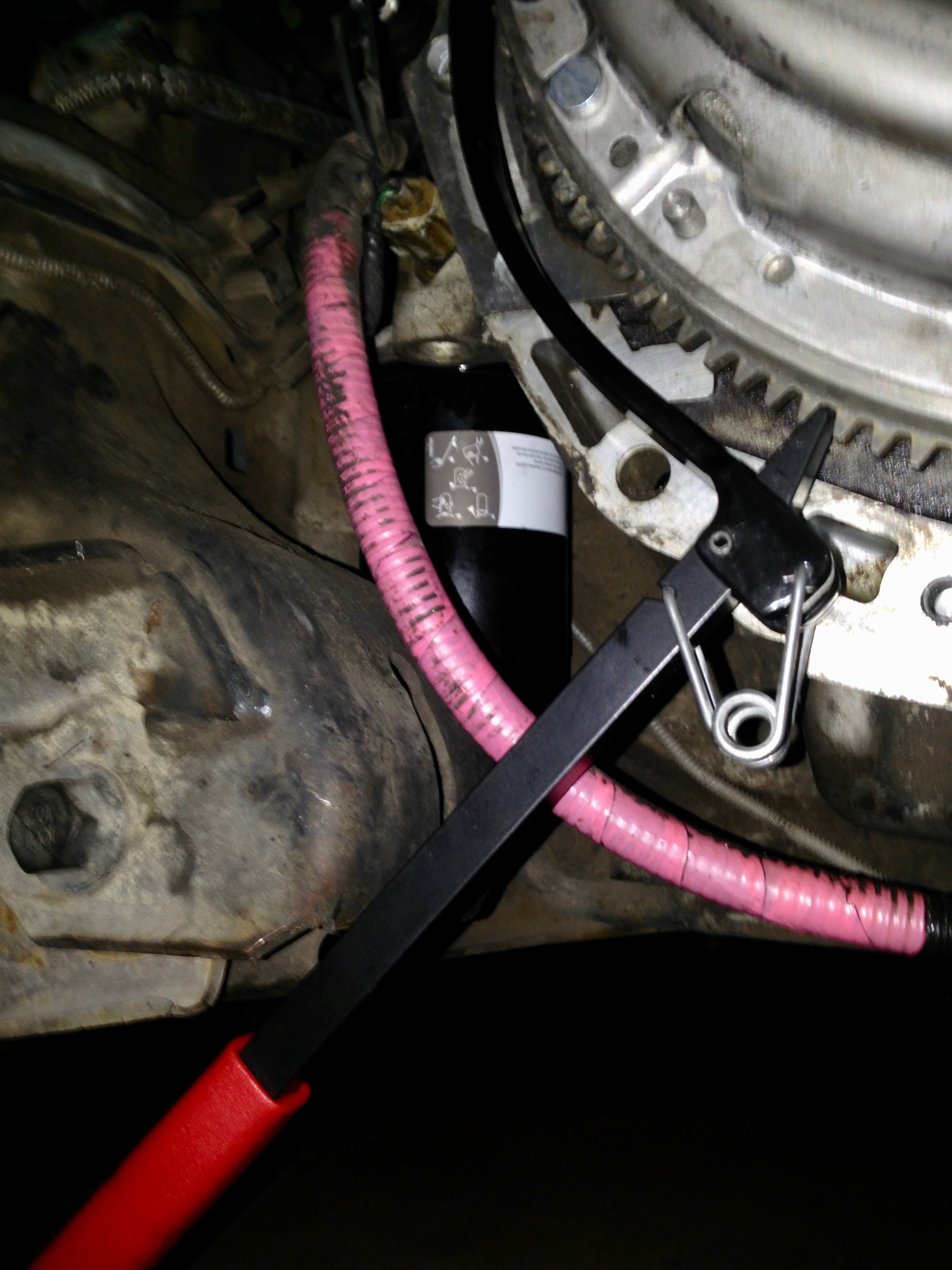
A flywheel or flex plate turner.
