= North Central Correctional Facility =

Prison in Iowa, United States

Coordinates: 42°23′32″N 94°36′22″W

- Interactive map of North Central Correctional Facility
- Location: 313 Lanedale Rockwell City, Iowa
- Status: open
- Security class: medium & minimum
- Capacity: 494
- Opened: 1982
- Managed by: Iowa Department of Corrections

The North Central Correctional Facility is a minimum security prison located in the Calhoun County community of Rockwell City, Iowa. The facility opened in 1982, on the site of the 1918 Iowa Women's Reformatory.

Currently the institution has about 90 staff members and approximately 502 inmates. The North Central Correctional Facility houses mainly low risk offenders. It offers a variety of educational services, and has contracted with a community college to provide services. Some of the educational services include helping inmates earn their GEDs, special education, and a self study program in 120 subject areas. The facility offers a number of work programs for inmates both on and off the grounds of the facility. There are jobs that provide on-the-job training in welding, woodwork, master gardening, plumbing, and others.
