= Clarinda Correctional Facility =

Prison in Iowa, U.S.

Coordinates: 40°45′44″N 95°02′14″W

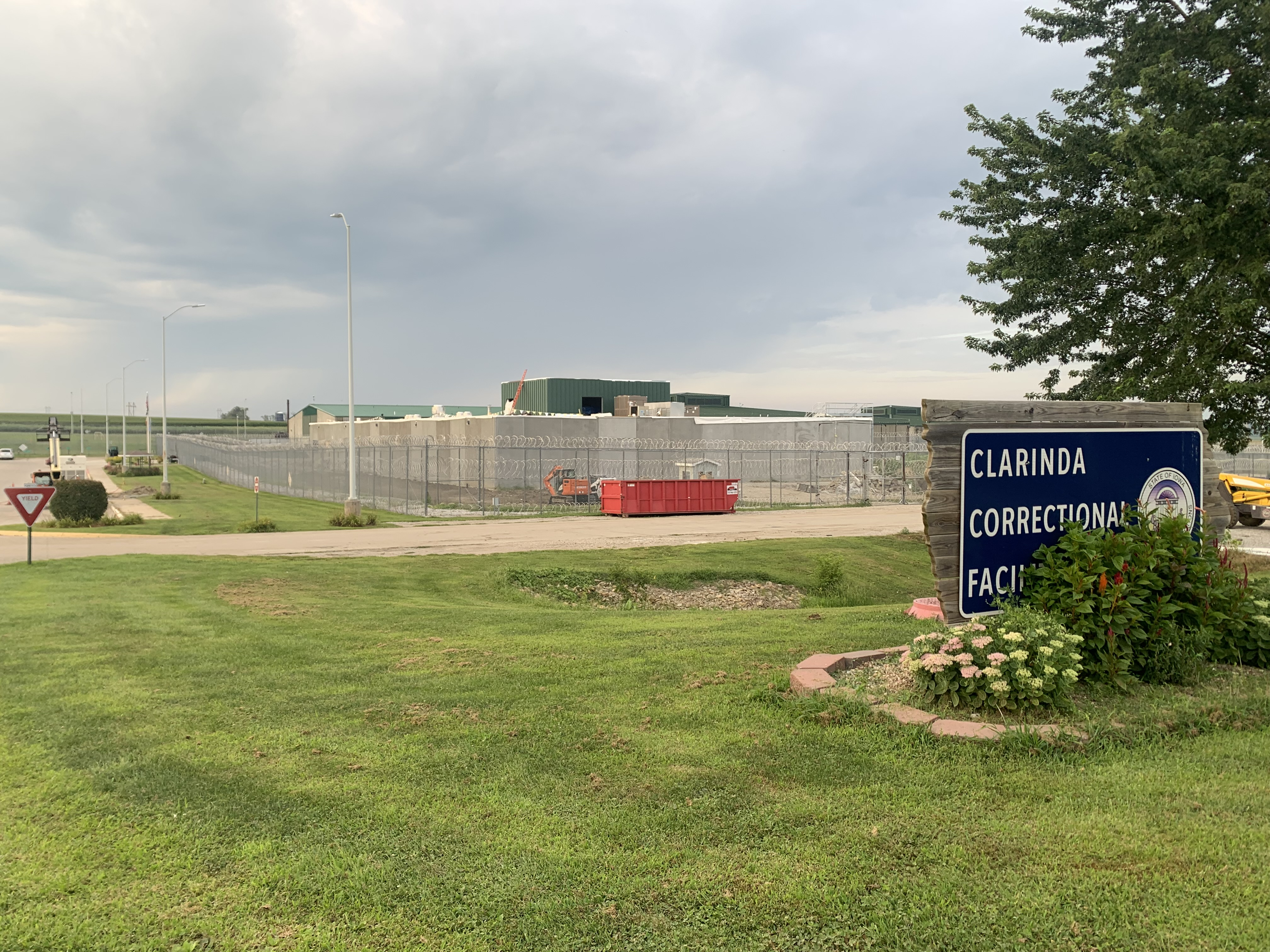
- Interactive map of Clarinda Correctional Facility
- Location: Clarinda, Iowa
- Status: Open
- Security class: Medium security
- Capacity: about 1000
- Opened: 1980
- Managed by: Iowa Department of Corrections

The Clarinda Correctional Facility is a correctional institution located in the Page County community of Clarinda, Iowa. It is in southwest Iowa on the grounds of the Clarinda Treatment Complex. As of January 22, 2017, the prison houses about 973 inmates, while another 137 are in the Lodged section, and the facility employs 287 people.

The facility was established in 1980 as a medium security facility that houses male inmates who are intellectually disabled, mentally ill, sex offenders, or have other social problems. It also protects inmates who are especially at risk of victimization by other inmates. The Clarinda facility uses a program called The Other Way (TOW) as a treatment program for inmates with substance abuse issues. TOW uses a phase system based on the principles of Alcoholics Anonymous. There are also educational opportunities for inmates, as well as social skills development classes, and work details both in and outside the facility.
