= Gitchie Manitou murders =

1973 mass murder in Iowa, U.S.

1973 Gitchie Manitou murders
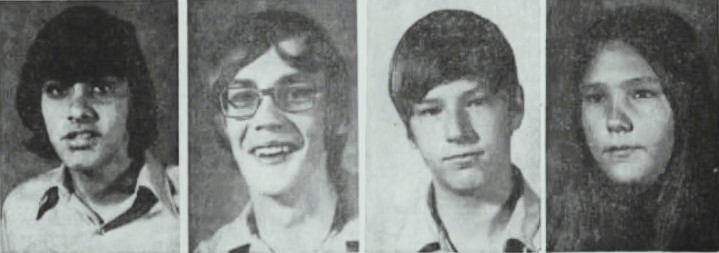
- Left to right: Roger Essem, Michael Hadrath, Stewart Baade, and Dana Baade
- Location: 43.49574°N 96.59289°W (approximate); Gitchie Manitou State Preserve, Lyon County, Iowa, U.S.
- Date: November 17, 1973 c. 10:35 p.m.
- Attack type: Mass murder; kidnapping; rape
- Deaths: 4
- Injuries: 1
- Perpetrators: Allen Fryer (29); David Fryer (24); James Fryer (21)
- Motive: Robbery; Rape; Possible eyewitness elimination
- Charges: First-degree murder Manslaughter
- Sentence: Life imprisonment without the possibility of parole

The Gitchie Manitou murders were an act of mass murder committed in the Gitchie Manitou State Preserve in Lyon County, Iowa, on the evening of November 17, 1973. Five teenage campers were ambushed by brothers Allen, David, and James Fryer as they sat around a campfire. Four of the teenagers—all male—were shot dead; the fifth—a 13-year-old girl—was kidnapped and raped before being released by her assailants.

Allen, David and James Fryer were tried separately for their roles in the murders; each was found guilty and sentenced to life imprisonment without the possibility of parole in 1974. All three remain incarcerated.

== Overview ==
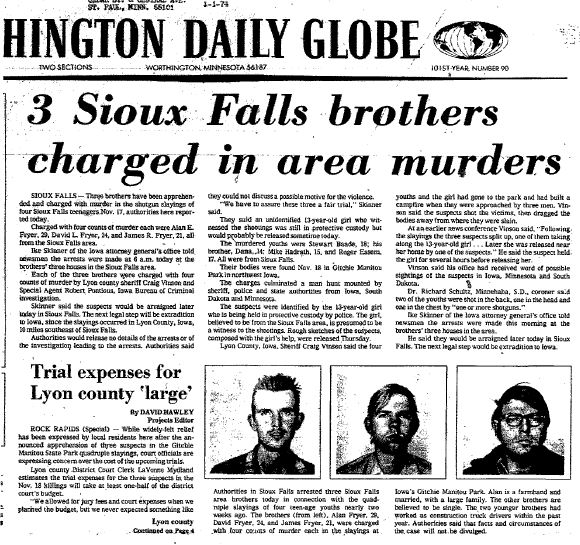
A newspaper report on the Fryer brothers, one day after capture

On the evening of November 17, 1973, five teenagers from Sioux Falls, South Dakota, were attacked by a group of three brothers. Four of the teenagers were killed and one was kidnapped and raped. Those killed were 17-year-old Roger Essem, 18-year-old Stewart Baade, Baade's 14-year-old younger brother Dana Baade, and 15-year-old Michael Hadrath. Thirteen-year-old Sandra Cheskey was raped by one of the perpetrators but survived. Her testimony would later prove essential in bringing the perpetrators to justice.

The perpetrators of the murders were brothers Allen Fryer, 29, David Fryer, 24, and James Fryer, 21, of Sioux Falls, South Dakota.

== The murders ==
On the evening of November 17, 1973, brothers David, Allen, and James Fryer encountered five teenage friends socializing around a campfire in the Gitchie Manitou State Preserve. (Note: The Gitchie Manitou State Preserve was a popular location for hikers and for local teenagers to socialize and drink alcohol.) The teenagers had convened at this location as a means of spending their Saturday evening, with two of the group—brothers Stewart and Dana Baade—at one stage singing a song as Stewart played his acoustic guitar. At least one joint of marijuana was shared between the group throughout the evening. Shortly before 10 p.m., Dana Baade exclaimed: "Stew! Don't play the guitar, and everyone be quiet for a minute!" Sandra Cheskey then remarked she could hear leaves crunching. Several minutes later, as Roger Essem and Stewart Baade left the campfire to retrieve wood, Cheskey then heard Roger exclaim: "Who are you? What do you want?"

The Fryer brothers had entered the reserve with the intention to poach deer when they encountered the teenagers. Believing that the teenagers may possess marijuana, the brothers decided to take the drugs by force.

The brothers returned to their truck to obtain shotguns; they then positioned themselves on a ridge overlooking the victims and opened fire, instantly killing 17-year-old Roger Essem and wounding 18-year-old Stewart Baade. The three remaining teenagers then took cover in the forest.

The Fryers ordered the teenagers to come out of hiding, falsely claiming to be narcotics officers. Michael Hadrath and Sandra Cheskey emerged together from the woods, whereupon Allen Fryer shot Hadrath in the arm and claimed that the trio were police officers and that they intended to confiscate the teenagers' marijuana. Allen and David then forced Dana Baade, Hadrath, and Cheskey to walk along a trail leading away from the campfire, while James Fryer fetched the brothers' pickup truck. After James arrived, Cheskey was tied up and placed in the back of the truck. Allen Fryer then got into the truck and drove away with Cheskey, while James and David rounded up the remaining the teenagers, including the wounded Stewart Baade, who had been lying where he had been shot. After Allen left, James and David Fryer killed the three teenagers with shotguns.

As Allen was driving Cheskey around, he claimed to be a police officer and "the boss" of the three attackers. After a short time, James drove Cheskey to an abandoned farm house, where David and James had already arrived earlier with their own car. James then got into the truck with Cheskey and raped her. Afterwards, Allen got back into the truck and asked Cheskey, "That wasn't so bad was it?". After this, James and David drove away from the farm, leaving Allen alone with Cheskey. Allen told Cheskey that they needed to go inside the farmhouse to "look for critters", but Cheskey refused. Seemingly relenting, Allen then drove Cheskey home. Cheskey was dropped off at her home at approximately 5 a.m.

Before leaving the farm, Allen refueled the truck from a large red fuel tank, which would later prove instrumental in locating the abandoned farm house. Allen then began to drive Cheskey home, still under the pretense of being a police officer, saying that Sandra was "too young to get busted".

== Investigation ==
The bodies of Michael Hadrath, Stewart and Dana Baade were discovered along a roadside the following afternoon by a couple from Sioux Falls, South Dakota, who were visiting the park. The body of Roger Essem was discovered at the campsite the following day.

Investigators originally questioned Cheskey's credibility, as she appeared to be noticeably blunt and composed while describing the crimes, as well as being able to recall several specific details at such a young age. The police interviewed her several times and issued her a polygraph test, which she passed.

On November 29, 1973, Cheskey was accompanied by Sheriff Craig Vinson as they drove around the countryside looking for the farmhouse where she had been held captive. Near Hartford, South Dakota, she recognized the farmhouse by the large red fuel tank standing next to the garage. The farm turned out to be owned by Allen Fryer's employer, a local farmer. By chance, Vinston and Cheskey then witnessed Allen Fryer drive by in the same brown pickup-truck that had been used on the night of the murders. Cheskey told Vinson: "That's him. That's the boss." Law enforcement quickly pulled the truck over and arrested Allen Fryer. Shortly afterward, David and James Fryer were also arrested.

Allen Fryer tried to claim that Cheskey's friends were the ones who had opened fire on the brothers, and that in the ensuing mayhem someone had been "accidentally" killed. By Allen's third interview, however, he admitted to the murders but tried to justify them by saying the five teens had been drinking and smoking marijuana. David Fryer told a similar story at first, but later confessed.

On November 30, 1973, Cheskey identified both David and James Fryer from a police lineup.

Allen and David Fryer were moved from Sioux Falls, SD to Lyon County Jail in Rock Rapids, Iowa. James Fryer remained in Sioux Falls because he was currently serving a jail sentence. On December 1, 1973, all three brothers were arraigned and charged with four counts of murder. Bond was set at $400,000 per person, amounting to $100,000 for each teenager slain.

== Trials ==
Sandra Cheskey's testimony would provide the bulk of evidence against the Fryer brothers during the 18-month-long trial.

=== David Fryer ===
On February 12, 1974, David Fryer pled guilty to the open charge of murder, three charges of murder, and one charge of manslaughter. David admitted to killing Stewart Baade. The judge sentenced David to life in prison without the possibility of parole. David stated; "If all my appeals fail, I'll actually write the governor and ask for the death penalty. I won't live out my life in jail. Keeping me locked up for life can't turn around what happened. It can't bring those people back." When David appealed his conviction, he claimed not to have had the opportunity to review the statements made by Cheskey to prosecutors during his trial, so the Iowa Supreme Court ordered a rehearing at Lyon County Courthouse on December 30, 1974 to review this evidence for his appeal.

=== Allen Fryer ===
Prior to trial, Allen Fryer was subjected to psychiatric testing, but was found fit to stand trial. He was tried before Judge James P. Kelley at the Lyon County Court House in May 1974, charged with four counts of first-degree murder. He pleaded not guilty to all charges.

The first witness to testify on behalf of the prosecution was Sandra Cheskey. Cheskey testified on May 16 that she and her companions had been seated around a campfire, singing and smoking marijuana when she heard a noise, then observed two men approaching. Cheskey further testified David Fryer had first shot and wounded Stewart Baade before Allen Fryer had fatally shot Roger Essem. The two had then advanced upon the teenagers from behind a tree before Michael Hadrath had stated "Who the hell do you think you are?" before Allen Fryer had shot him once in the arm. She, Hadrath, and Dana Baade had then been forced to a parking area, where she had been bundled into a pickup truck before Allen had driven her from the scene. She was then driven to an abandoned farmhouse close to Hartford, where the brothers had convened and conferred. Here, she had been raped by James Fryer before Allen had driven her home, having threatened her against informing anyone about her ordeal.

On May 20, 1974, Allen was found guilty of four counts of first-degree murder and sentenced to four consecutive life terms in prison.

On June 18, 1974, after Allen Fryer's trial, both he and James Fryer (who was awaiting trial), escaped from the Lyon County Jail, stole a vehicle, and fled the state. Two days after escaping from jail, their stolen vehicle was involved in a hit-and-run of a pedestrian near the town of Gillette, Wyoming. They were later arrested after leading police on a high-speed chase and brought back to Iowa to face federal charges.

=== James Fryer ===
James' trial began on December 3, 1974, in Lyon County. However, the defense applied for a change of venue to Dickinson County, Iowa, to obtain an impartial jury. The trial recommenced at the Dickinson County Courthouse on December 11 with jury selection. After a hearing of how the boys' bodies were discovered, Cheskey gave her testimony. A state psychiatrist determined that James had an IQ of 85 and had poor control over his own behavior. On December 20, 1974, James Fryer was found guilty of three charges of first-degree murder and one charge of manslaughter. On January 7, 1975, James Fryer was sentenced to three concurrent life sentences for the first-degree murders of Michael Hadrath, Stewart Baade, and Dana Baade, as well as eight years for the manslaughter of Roger Essom. As James would be serving life in prison without the possibility of parole, the District Attorney concluded that there was no need to subject Cheskey to a new trial regarding her rape by James Fryer.

All three of the Fryer brothers were sentenced to life imprisonment without the possibility of parole, and all their subseqeuent appeals were rejected. In 2016, David Fryer asked the parole board to transmute his conviction to life imprisonment with the possibility of parole, but this was rejected after a testimony by Sandra Cheskey and Lynette Hadrath, Mike Hadrath's sister. As of 2024, Allen was serving his life sentence at the penitentiary in Anamosa, Iowa, while David and James are serving their life sentences at the Fort Dodge Correctional Facility in Fort Dodge, Iowa.

== See also ==
- Capital punishment in Iowa
- Crime of opportunity
- Gun violence in the United States
- List of kidnappings (1970–1979)
- List of murdered American children

== Cited works and further reading ==
- Cawthorne, Nigel; Tibballs, Geoff (1993). Killers: Contract Killers, Spree Killers, Sex Killers. The Ruthless Exponents of Murder. London: Boxtree. ISBN 0-7522-0850-0.
- Duwe, Grant (2014). Mass Murder in the United States: A History. North Carolina: McFarland Incorporated. ISBN 978-0-786-43150-2.
- Franscell, Ron (2011). Delivered from Evil: True Stories of Ordinary People Who Faced Monstrous Mass Killers and Survived. Massacheusetts: Fair Winds Press. ISBN 978-1-592-33440-7.
- Hamman, Phillip; Hamman, Sandy (2016). Gitchie Girl: The Survivor's Inside Story of the Mass Murders that Shocked the Heartland. Nevada: Histria Books. ISBN 978-1-632-13200-0.
- Hamman, Phillip; Hamman, Sandy (2019). Gitchie Girl Uncovered: The True Story of a Night of Mass Murder and the Hunt for the Deranged Killers. Nevada: Histria Books. ISBN 978-1-632-13700-5.
- Lane, Brian; Gregg, Wilfred (1994). The Encyclopedia of Mass Murder. London: Headline Book Publishing. ISBN 0-747-20897-2.
- Leyton, Elliot (2011) [1986]. Hunting Humans: The Rise Of The Modern Multiple Murderer. Toronto: McClelland & Stewart. ISBN 978-0-140-11687-8.
