= Universalist Church (Mitchellville, Iowa) =

- U.S. National Register of Historic Places
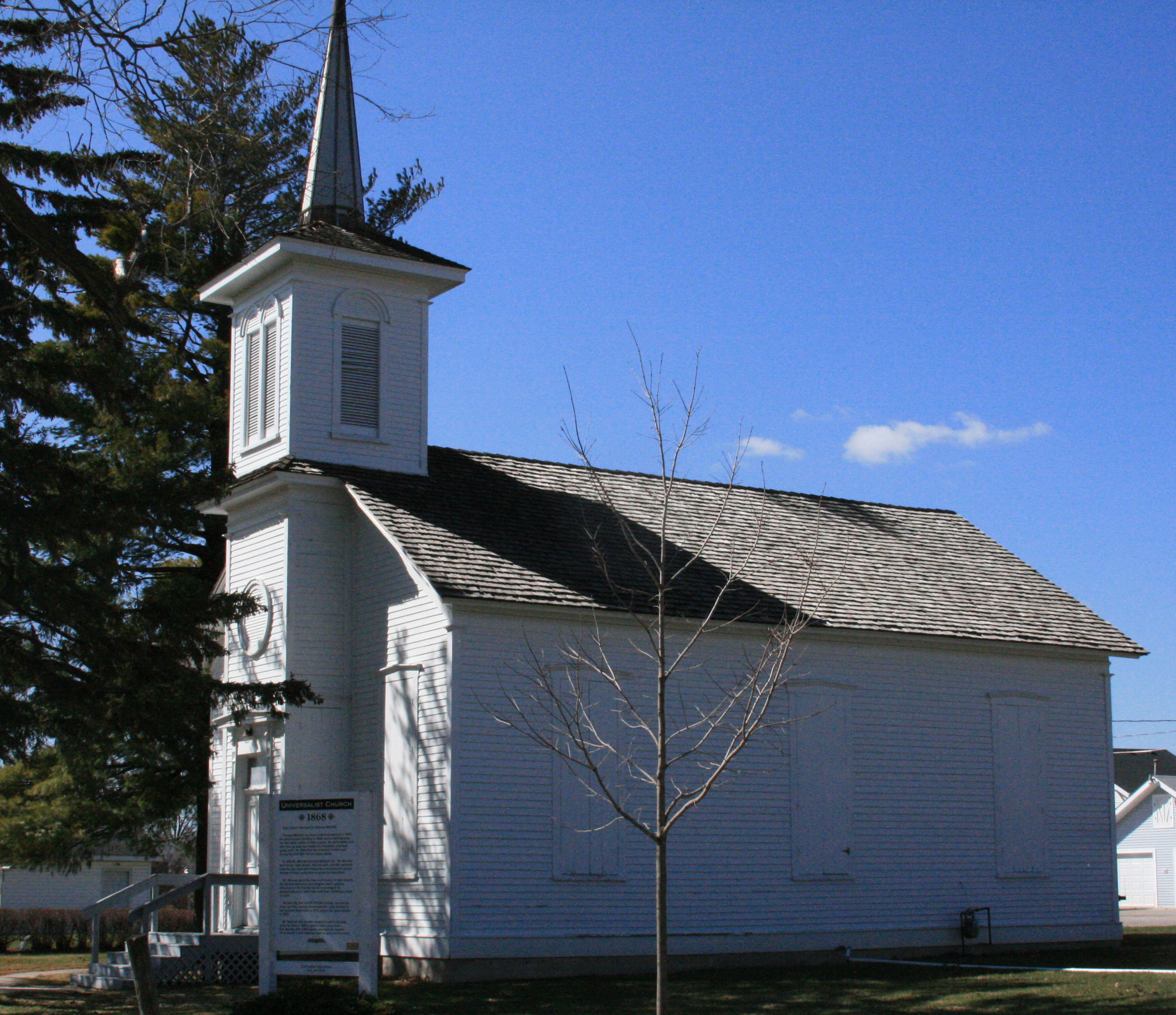

- Location within Iowa Location within the United States
- Location: 420 4th St. Mitchellville, Iowa
- Coordinates: 41°40′16″N 93°21′41″W
- Built: 1868
- Architectural style: Mid 19th Century Revival
- NRHP reference No.: 05000253
- Added to NRHP: September 6, 2005

The Universalist Church is a historic building located in Mitchellville, Iowa, United States. The congregation was organized in 1868 with a membership of thirty-five people. The first officers were: Thomas Mitchell, Moderator; Barlard Slate, Clerk; and Tillie Mitchell, Treasurer. The deacons were W.S. Jones, A. Rothrock and Pauline Weeks. Pastors included: W.W. King, T.C. Eaton, J.R. Sage, A. Vedder and F.W. Gillette. The church building was erected at a cost of $2,000.

Built in 1868, it is the oldest documented building in Mitchellville. It is considered an "outstanding example of an early church design based on examples found in small New England towns." The building also served the town as its first school building. After the congregation disbanded they sold their property to the state of Iowa to use for weddings, funerals, and appropriate functions. The church building, along with two outhouses on the property, was listed on the National Register of Historic Places in 2005.
