= Clarinda, Iowa =

City in Iowa, United States

- City
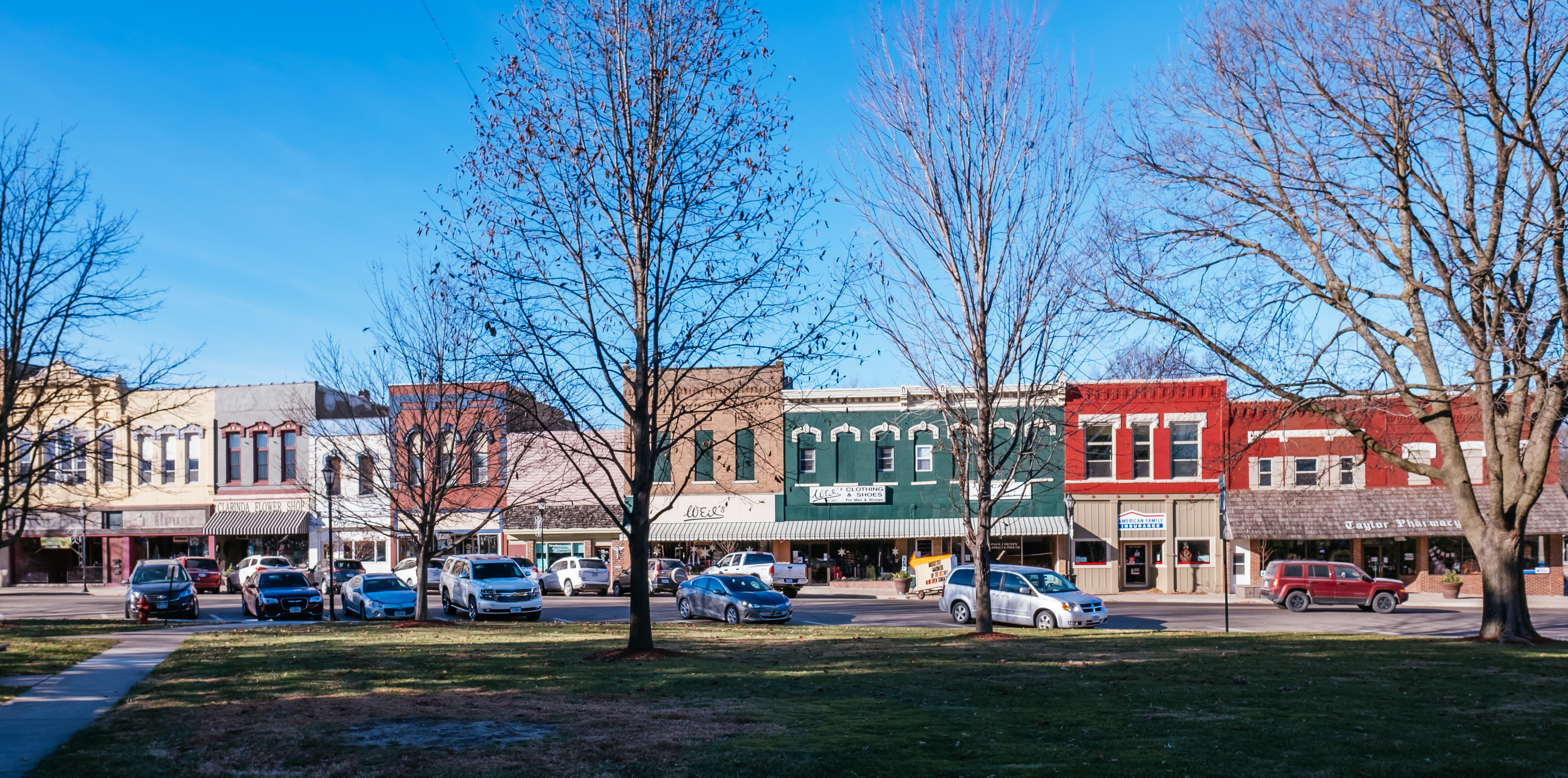
- West side of the town square
- Motto: "Honor the Past...Imagine the Future"
- Location within Page County and Iowa
- Coordinates: 40°44′46″N 95°02′09″W
- Country: United States
- State: Iowa
- County: Page

Government
  - Type: City Manager
  - Mayor: Craig Hill

Area
  - Total: 5.13 sq mi (13.29 km^{2})
  - Land: 5.10 sq mi (13.21 km^{2})
  - Water: 0.035 sq mi (0.09 km^{2})
- Elevation: 1,027 ft (313 m)

Population (2020)
  - Total: 5,369
  - Density: 1,052.7/sq mi (406.46/km^{2})
- Time zone: UTC-6 (CST)
  - Summer (DST): UTC-5 (CDT)
- ZIP code: 51632
- Area code: 712
- FIPS code: 19-13575
- GNIS ID: 2393534
- Website: bestiowatown.com

Clarinda is a city in and the county seat of Page County, Iowa, United States. It is located in Nodaway Township. The population was 5,369 at the time of the 2020 census.

== History ==
Clarinda was founded in 1851, and incorporated on December 8, 1866. Many stories are told of such notables as Jesse James frequently passing through.

The town is named for Clarinda Buck, who according to legend carried water to the surveyors while Page County was first being surveyed.

The best known national firm in Clarinda for many decades was Berry's Seed Company, a mail order farm seed distribution business founded in 1885 at Clarinda by A. A. Berry. Berry's Seed Company diversified into retail stores in the 1950s, but the stores were sold off over the following decade, and today the company, known as Berry's Garden Center, operates from its one remaining retail outlet in Danville, Illinois.

In 1943, during World War II, an internment camp designed for 3,000 prisoners of war with sixty barracks and a 150-bed hospital was built in Clarinda. German prisoners were the first to arrive at Camp Clarinda, followed in 1945 by Italian and Japanese POWs.

The southeast area of Clarinda was once dubbed "Gun Town" and remains known by that name today. A noted author wrote, "In the twenties and thirties, Clarinda seemed to be two separate towns: Guntown and Uptown. In the middle of the square was, and remains, the courthouse. The four blocks surrounding the square are filled with businesses. Guntown was a town all its own. The 700 block of East Garfield was a solid block of businesses--grocery stores, barber, a Chinese restaurant, another restaurant on a corner, a rug factory, a large grocery, the Swifts packing plant, and railroad tracks with freight depot and roundhouse to turn trains around."

== Transportation ==
Road Network

Clarinda is located on US Highway 71 and Iowa Highway 2. In the past, both of these highways came through the center of town, but there is now a bypass that takes both highways to the south and east of Clarinda proper. There is also a good network of “farm to market” or county roads servicing the area.

Railroad Service

Early in its history, Clarinda was served by railroads from seven different directions - 5 of which were predecessors to the Chicago, Burlington, and Quincy Railroad (CB&Q). The short westbound leg of track connecting Clarinda to Shenandoah was torn up in 1936 due to a washout of the track. In 1946, service was lost on the eastbound leg to Humeston and the line southwest to Tarkio, Missouri, through Coin, Iowa. Service was maintained south of Clarinda until the 1950s and was then trimmed back to a branch serving Clarinda from the main line to the north at Villisca, Iowa. This line survived a merger into the Burlington Northern but was abandoned in the 1980s. The beautiful brick depot in Clarinda still survives and is now the Student Union of the Iowa Western Community College-Clarinda campus.

There were two additional shortline railroads that ran to Clarinda. One was the Iowa & Southwestern which connected Clarinda southwest through College Springs to the Iowa-Missouri border town of Blanchard. The I&SW had its own depot very close to the Clarinda CB&Q Depot. It was abandoned before 1914. The second route was the Clarinda and St. Louis Railroad which ran south out of Clarinda roughly paralleling the CB&Q line to the east and terminating in Rosenberry, Missouri. This line joined with the Wabash Railroad just a few miles east of the CB&Q line also from Clarinda interchanged with the Wabash in the town of Burlington Junction, Missouri. The Clarinda and St. Louis Railroad was abandoned in the 1899 after only a few years of operation.

Clarinda now joins a growing list of county seats in Iowa without rail service.[12]

Air Service

Camp Clarinda was located by what today is the town's municipal airport, Schenck Field (named for aviator/farmer Ray Schenck, who built the original Clarinda Airport on the location).

== Geography ==
Clarinda is located along the West Nodaway River, just north of its confluence with the East Nodaway River.

According to the United States Census Bureau, the city has a total area of 5.22 square miles (13.52 km^{2}), of which 5.19 square miles (13.44 km^{2}) is land and 0.03 square miles (0.08 km^{2}) is water.

=== Climate ===
Climate data for Clarinda, Iowa (1991–2020, extremes 1893–present)
Month	Jan	Feb	Mar	Apr	May	Jun	Jul	Aug	Sep	Oct	Nov	Dec	Year
Record high °F (°C)	68 (20)	80 (27)	92 (33)	96 (36)	105 (41)	105 (41)	112 (44)	114 (46)	108 (42)	94 (34)	82 (28)	72 (22)	114 (46)
Mean maximum °F (°C)	54.9 (12.7)	60.7 (15.9)	74.7 (23.7)	84.5 (29.2)	89.7 (32.1)	92.5 (33.6)	94.1 (34.5)	93.4 (34.1)	90.8 (32.7)	85.5 (29.7)	71.0 (21.7)	59.1 (15.1)	96.3 (35.7)
Mean daily maximum °F (°C)	32.7 (0.4)	37.7 (3.2)	50.8 (10.4)	62.9 (17.2)	73.0 (22.8)	82.3 (27.9)	85.8 (29.9)	84.1 (28.9)	77.9 (25.5)	65.7 (18.7)	50.1 (10.1)	37.6 (3.1)	61.7 (16.5)
Daily mean °F (°C)	22.3 (−5.4)	27.1 (−2.7)	39.1 (3.9)	50.4 (10.2)	61.7 (16.5)	71.5 (21.9)	75.0 (23.9)	72.8 (22.7)	64.9 (18.3)	52.6 (11.4)	38.6 (3.7)	27.5 (−2.5)	50.3 (10.2)
Mean daily minimum °F (°C)	11.9 (−11.2)	16.4 (−8.7)	27.5 (−2.5)	38.0 (3.3)	50.3 (10.2)	60.8 (16.0)	64.1 (17.8)	61.5 (16.4)	51.8 (11.0)	39.4 (4.1)	27.1 (−2.7)	17.4 (−8.1)	38.9 (3.8)
Mean minimum °F (°C)	−10.6 (−23.7)	−4.0 (−20.0)	6.2 (−14.3)	21.8 (−5.7)	34.8 (1.6)	47.4 (8.6)	52.8 (11.6)	50.4 (10.2)	36.1 (2.3)	22.9 (−5.1)	10.5 (−11.9)	−3.6 (−19.8)	−14.8 (−26.0)
Record low °F (°C)	−31 (−35)	−29 (−34)	−24 (−31)	6 (−14)	21 (−6)	36 (2)	42 (6)	36 (2)	24 (−4)	−1 (−18)	−10 (−23)	−27 (−33)	−31 (−35)
Average precipitation inches (mm)	0.79 (20)	1.16 (29)	2.22 (56)	3.32 (84)	5.60 (142)	5.33 (135)	4.77 (121)	3.95 (100)	3.30 (84)	2.85 (72)	1.98 (50)	1.38 (35)	36.65 (931)
Average snowfall inches (cm)	6.5 (17)	6.3 (16)	2.7 (6.9)	0.9 (2.3)	0.0 (0.0)	0.0 (0.0)	0.0 (0.0)	0.0 (0.0)	0.0 (0.0)	0.3 (0.76)	1.8 (4.6)	4.3 (11)	22.8 (58)
Average precipitation days (≥ 0.01 in)	5.3	6.0	7.7	10.7	13.0	10.9	9.7	8.9	7.6	8.3	6.3	5.7	100.1
Average snowy days (≥ 0.1 in)	3.6	3.6	1.5	0.3	0.0	0.0	0.0	0.0	0.0	0.2	1.1	3.1	13.4
Source: NOAA

== Demographics ==
Historical population
Census	Pop.	Note	%±
1860	427		—
1870	1,022		139.3%
1880	2,011		96.8%
1890	3,262		62.2%
1900	3,276		0.4%
1910	3,832		17.0%
1920	4,511		17.7%
1930	4,962		10.0%
1940	4,905		−1.1%
1950	5,086		3.7%
1960	5,901		16.0%
1970	5,420		−8.2%
1980	5,458		0.7%
1990	5,104		−6.5%
2000	5,690		11.5%
2010	5,572		−2.1%
2020	5,369		−3.6%
U.S. Decennial Census

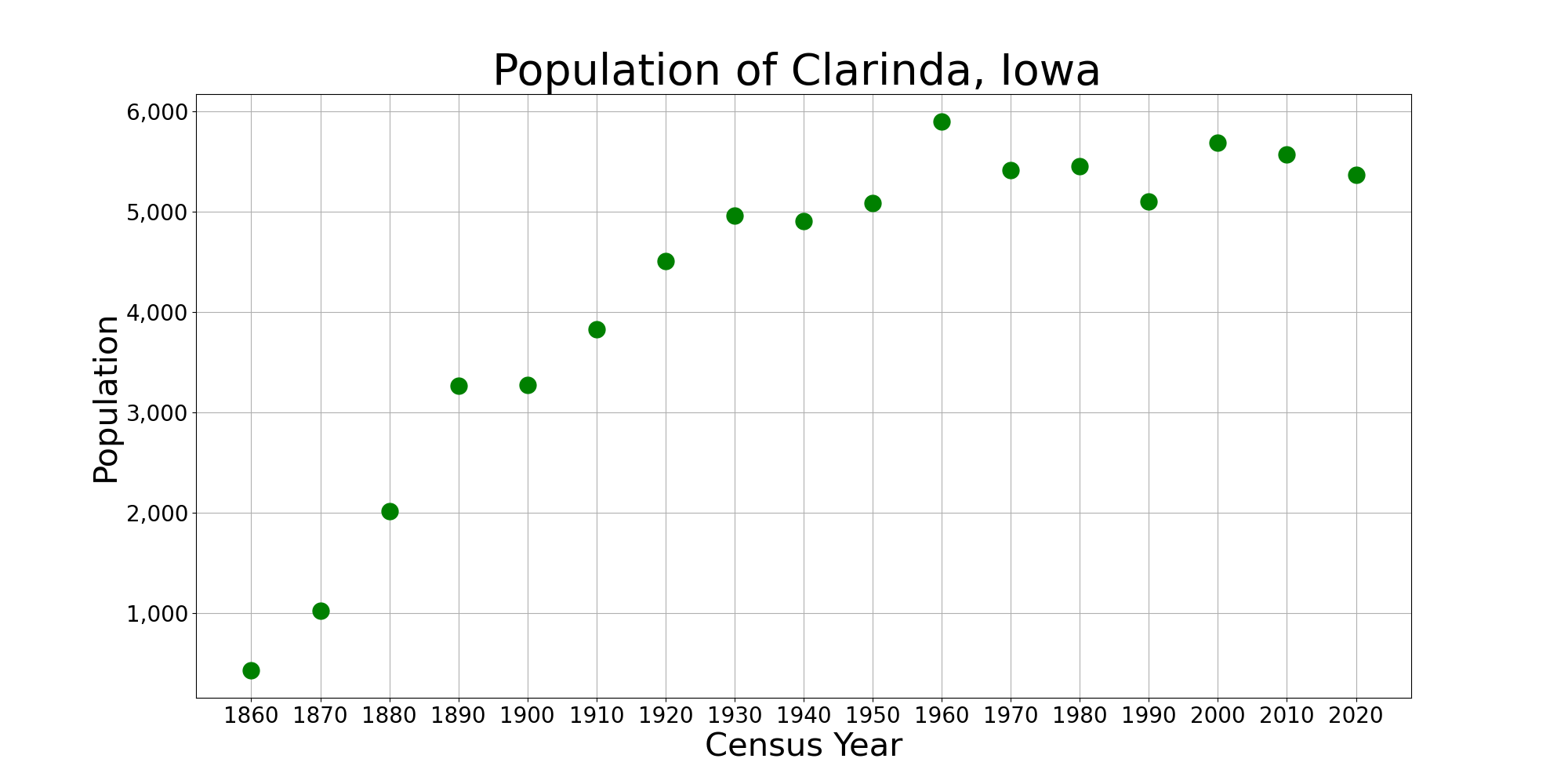
The population of Clarinda, Iowa from US census data

=== 2020 census ===
As of the 2020 census, there were 5,369 people, 1,899 households, and 1,094 families residing in the city. The population density was 1,052.7 inhabitants per square mile (406.5/km^{2}). There were 2,170 housing units at an average density of 425.5 per square mile (164.3/km^{2}).

The median age in the city was 40.0 years. 21.2% of residents were under the age of 20, 5.8% were between the ages of 20 and 24, 29.7% were from 25 to 44, 22.7% were from 45 to 64, and 20.7% were 65 years of age or older. 19.6% of residents were under the age of 18. For every 100 females, there were 142.0 males, and for every 100 females age 18 and over there were 146.1 males age 18 and over. The gender makeup of the city was 58.7% male and 41.3% female.

97.1% of residents lived in urban areas, while 2.9% lived in rural areas.

Of all households, 25.5% had children under the age of 18 living with them. Of all households, 42.3% were married-couple households, 6.0% were cohabiting-couple households, 31.0% had a female householder with no spouse or partner present, and 20.8% had a male householder with no spouse or partner present. 42.4% of all households were non-families. Of all households, 37.8% were made up of individuals, and 19.7% had someone living alone who was 65 years of age or older.

Of all housing units, 12.5% were vacant. The homeowner vacancy rate was 4.2% and the rental vacancy rate was 10.2%.

Racial composition as of the 2020 census
Race	Number	Percent
White	4,650	86.6%
Black or African American	330	6.1%
American Indian and Alaska Native	34	0.6%
Asian	63	1.2%
Native Hawaiian and Other Pacific Islander	0	0.0%
Some other race	30	0.6%
Two or more races	262	4.9%
Hispanic or Latino (of any race)	190	3.5%

=== 2010 census ===
As of the census of 2010, there were 5,572 people, 1,928 households, and 1,153 families residing in the city. The population density was 1,073.6 inhabitants per square mile (414.5/km^{2}). There were 2,180 housing units at an average density of 420.0 per square mile (162.2/km^{2}). The racial makeup of the city was 89.2% White, 5.6% African American, 1.1% Native American, 1.5% Asian, 0.1% Pacific Islander, 0.8% from other races, and 1.7% from two or more races. Hispanic or Latino of any race were 3.2% of the population.

There were 1,928 households, of which 26.1% had children under the age of 18 living with them, 45.3% were married couples living together, 10.2% had a female householder with no husband present, 4.4% had a male householder with no wife present, and 40.2% were non-families. 35.3% of all households were made up of individuals, and 18% had someone living alone who was 65 years of age or older. The average household size was 2.19 and the average family size was 2.80.

The median age in the city was 40 years. 21.1% of residents were under the age of 18; 8.9% were between the ages of 18 and 24; 26.4% were from 25 to 44; 25.6% were from 45 to 64; and 18% were 65 years of age or older. The gender makeup of the city was 57.6% male and 42.4% female.

=== 2000 census ===
As of the census of 2000, there were 5,690 people, 2,017 households, and 1,246 families residing in the city. The population density was 1,096.1 inhabitants per square mile (423.2/km^{2}). There were 2,188 housing units at an average density of 421.5 per square mile (162.7/km^{2}). The racial makeup of the city was 92.02% White, 4.62% African American, 0.65% Native American, 1.09% Asian, 0.04% Pacific Islander, 0.51% from other races, and 1.07% from two or more races. Hispanic or Latino of any race were 1.41% of the population.

There were 2,017 households, out of which 27.5% had children under the age of 18 living with them, 49.4% were married couples living together, 9.8% had a female householder with no husband present, and 38.2% were non-families. 34.7% of all households were made up of individuals, and 18.0% had someone living alone who was 65 years of age or older. The average household size was 2.21 and the average family size was 2.83.

Age spread: 22.1% under the age of 18, 9.3% from 18 to 24, 29.8% from 25 to 44, 19.5% from 45 to 64, and 19.3% who were 65 years of age or older. The median age was 38 years. For every 100 females, there were 121.7 males. For every 100 females age 18 and over, there were 122.2 males.

The median income for a household in the city was $35,871, and the median income for a family was $43,654. Males had a median income of $35,061 versus $23,635 for females. The per capita income for the city was $15,136. About 9.9% of families and 16.3% of the population were below the poverty line, including 18.2% of those under age 18 and 6.6% of those age 65 or over.

== Economy ==
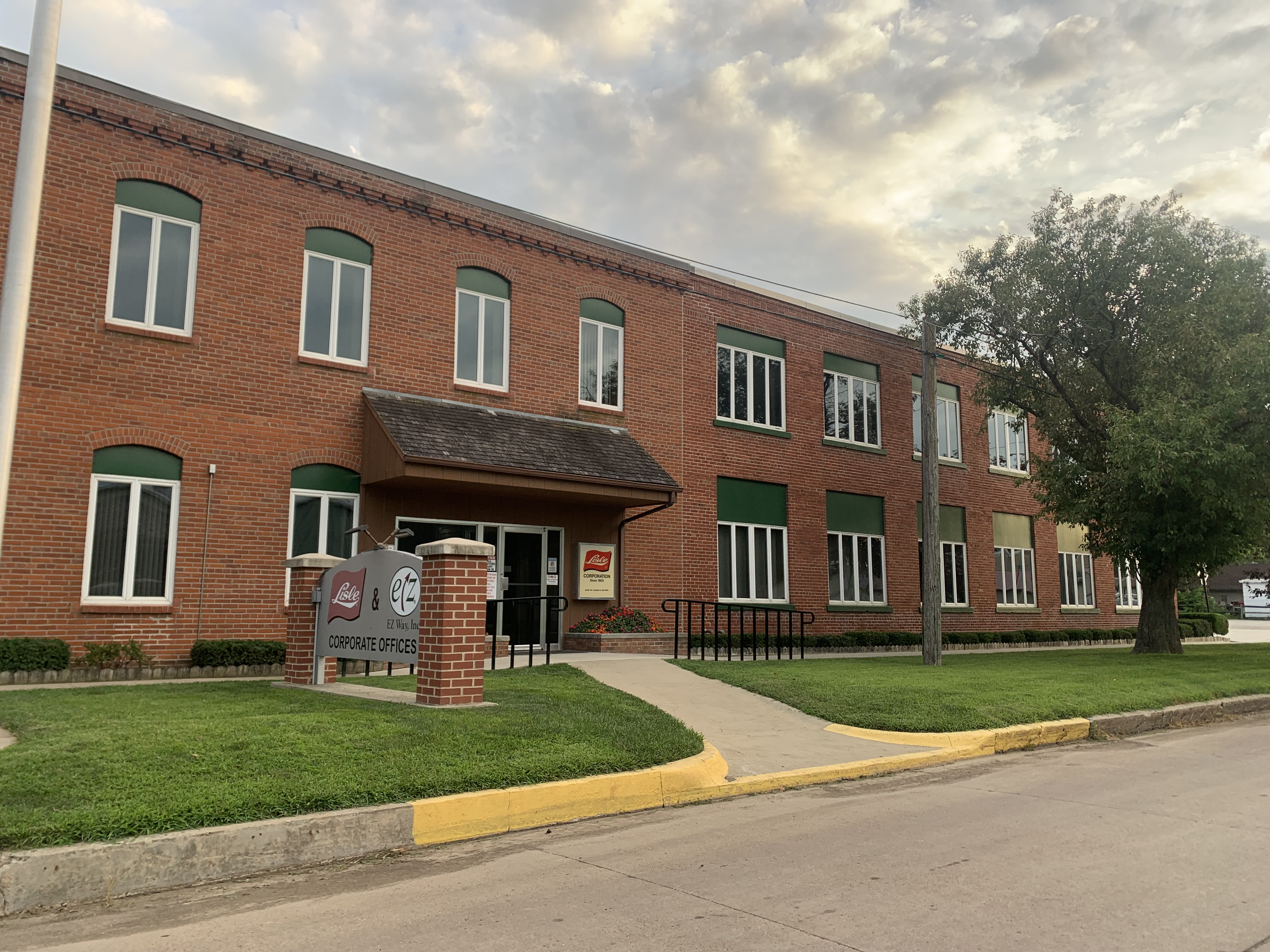
Lisle Corporation headquarters in Clarinda, Iowa

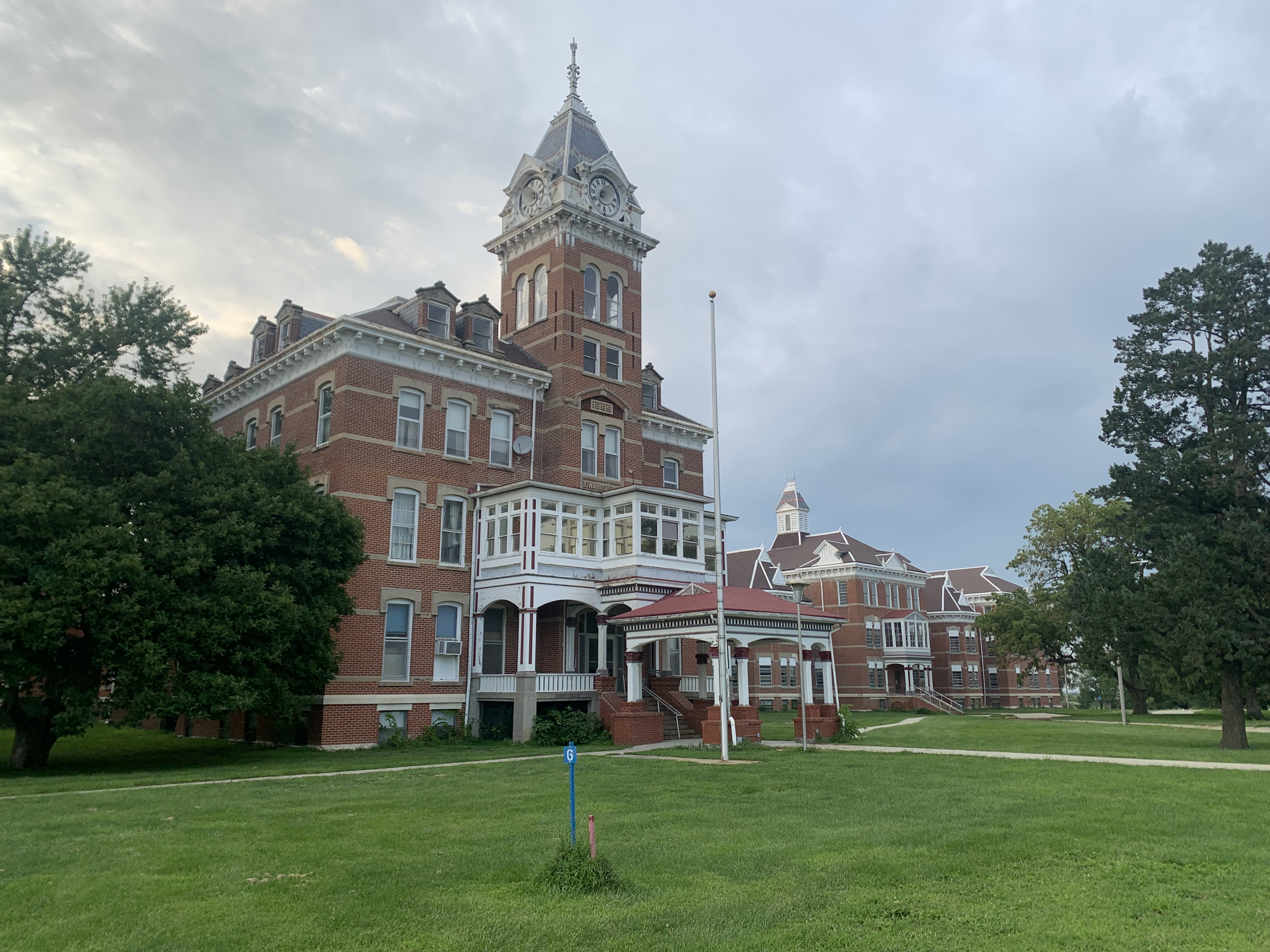
Building in the Clarinda Treatment Complex in northern Clarinda

NSK-AKS (a subsidiary of the Japanese corporation NSK Ltd.) operates a manufacturing plant in Clarinda that produces ball and roller bearings.

Lisle Corporation, which makes hand tools and garage creepers for auto mechanics, was founded in Clarinda in 1903.

A large mental health center, the Clarinda Treatment Complex, is located on the north edge of the city. It was established in 1884 as the third mental asylum in the state of Iowa. Mental health professionals treated sex offenders, the mentally ill, alcoholics, drug addicts, and the criminally insane until its closing in 2015.

== Sports ==
Clarinda is the home of the Clarinda A's, a summer amateur baseball team, founded by Merl Eberly. The team won the 1981 National Baseball Congress championship. It has sent several players on to the major leagues, notably Baseball Hall of Fame member Ozzie Smith, who regularly returns to Clarinda for special events. Previously, Clarinda was home to minor league baseball. The 1910-1911 Clarinda Antelopes played as members of the Class D level Missouri-Iowa-Nebraska-Kansas League.

== Clarinda picture gallery ==
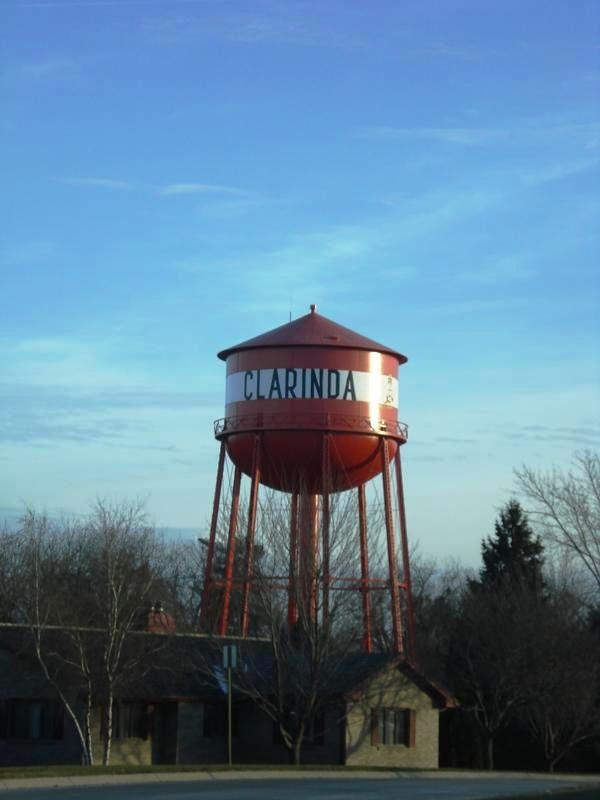
Clarinda water tower

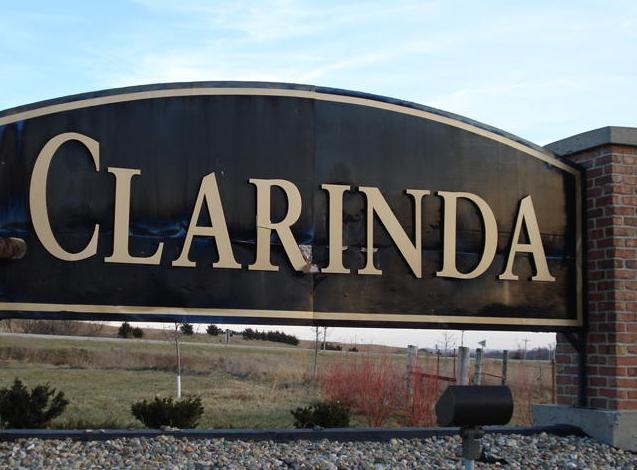
Clarinda welcome sign

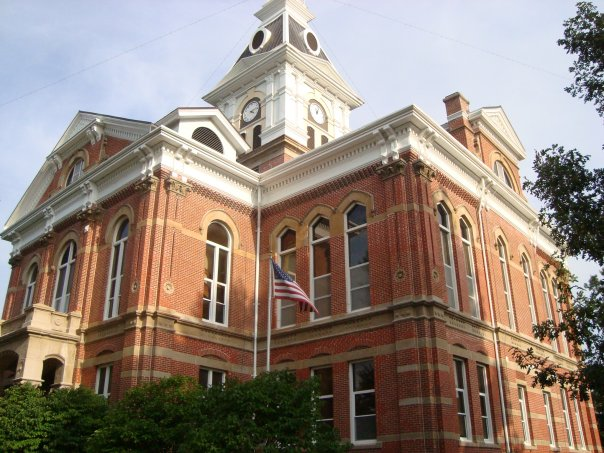
Page County, Iowa Courthouse in Clarinda

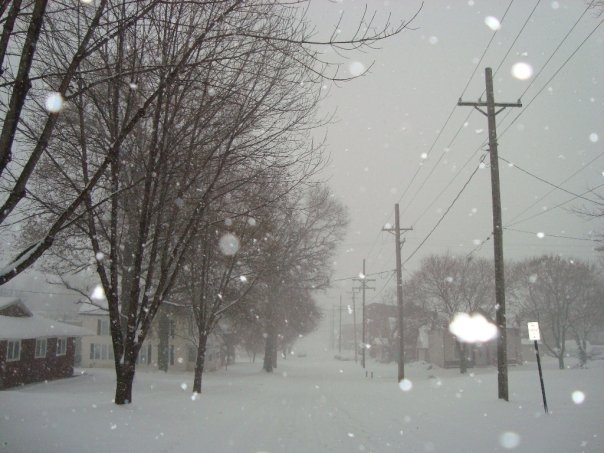
Snowing in Clarinda (December 2009)

== Education ==
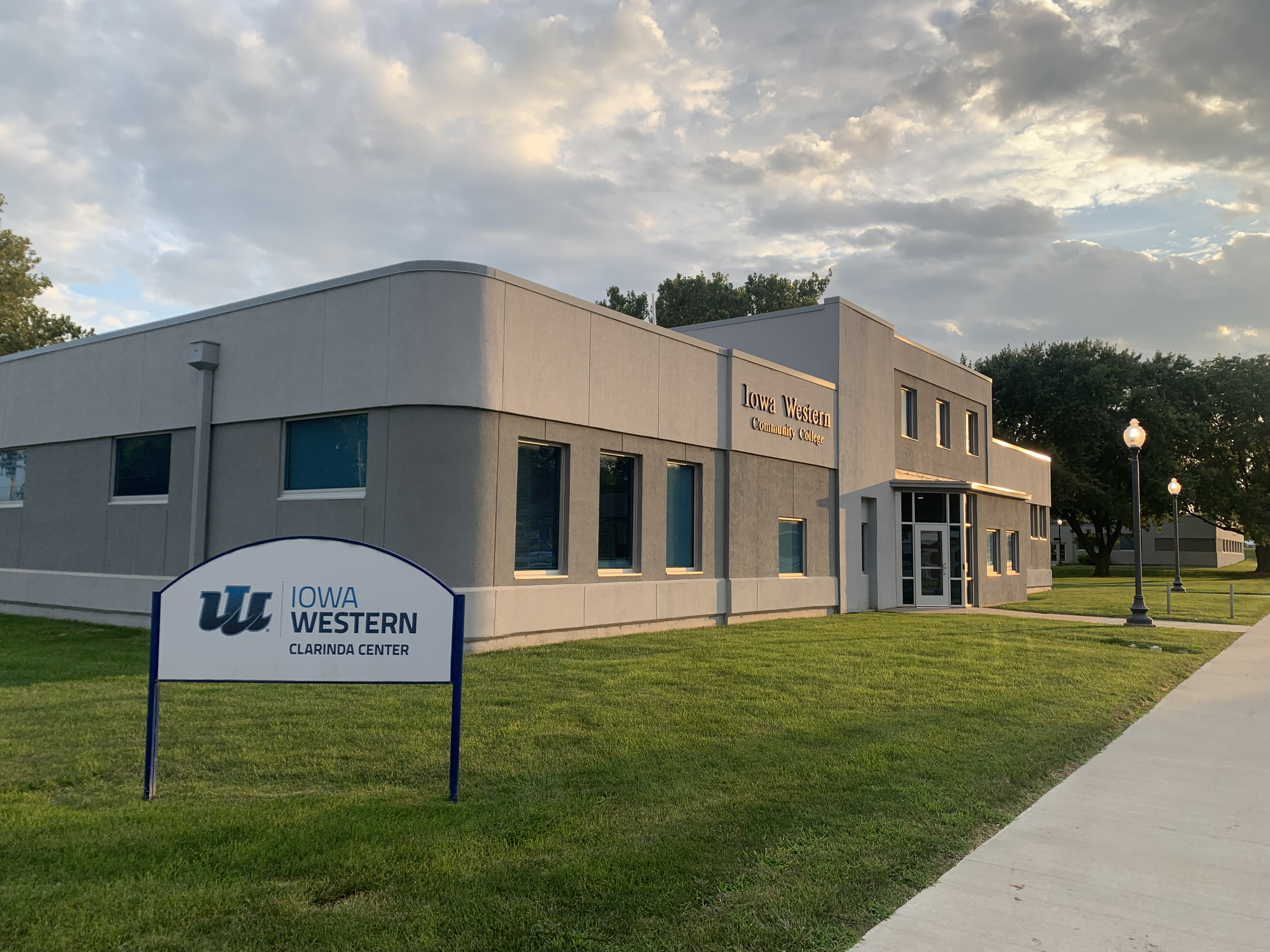
Iowa Western Community College campus in Clarinda

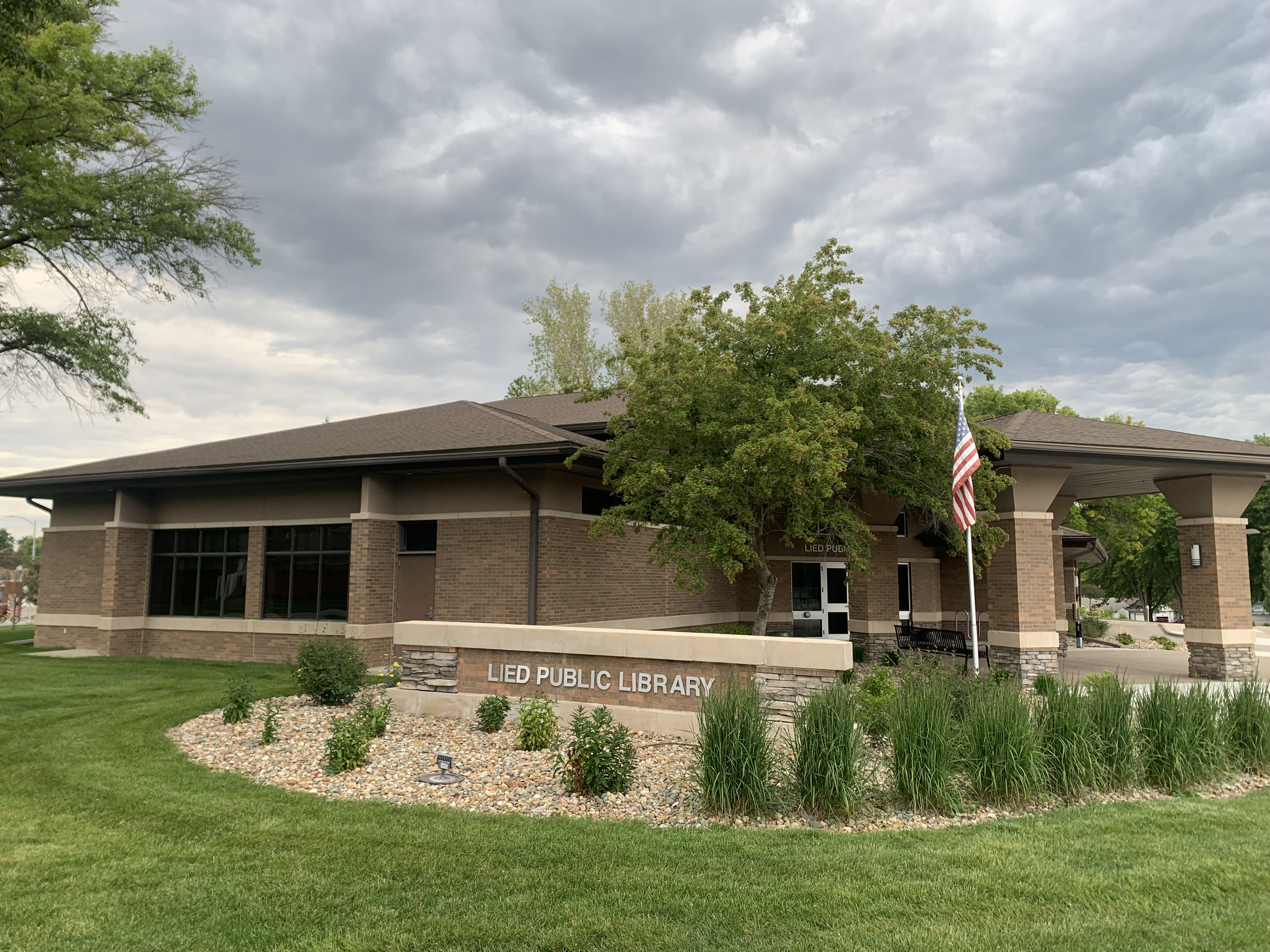
Lied Public Library in Clarinda, Iowa

The Clarinda Community School District serves the municipality.

Clarinda is also home to a campus of Iowa Western Community College.

There is one public library in the city, called Lied Public Library.

== Infrastructure ==
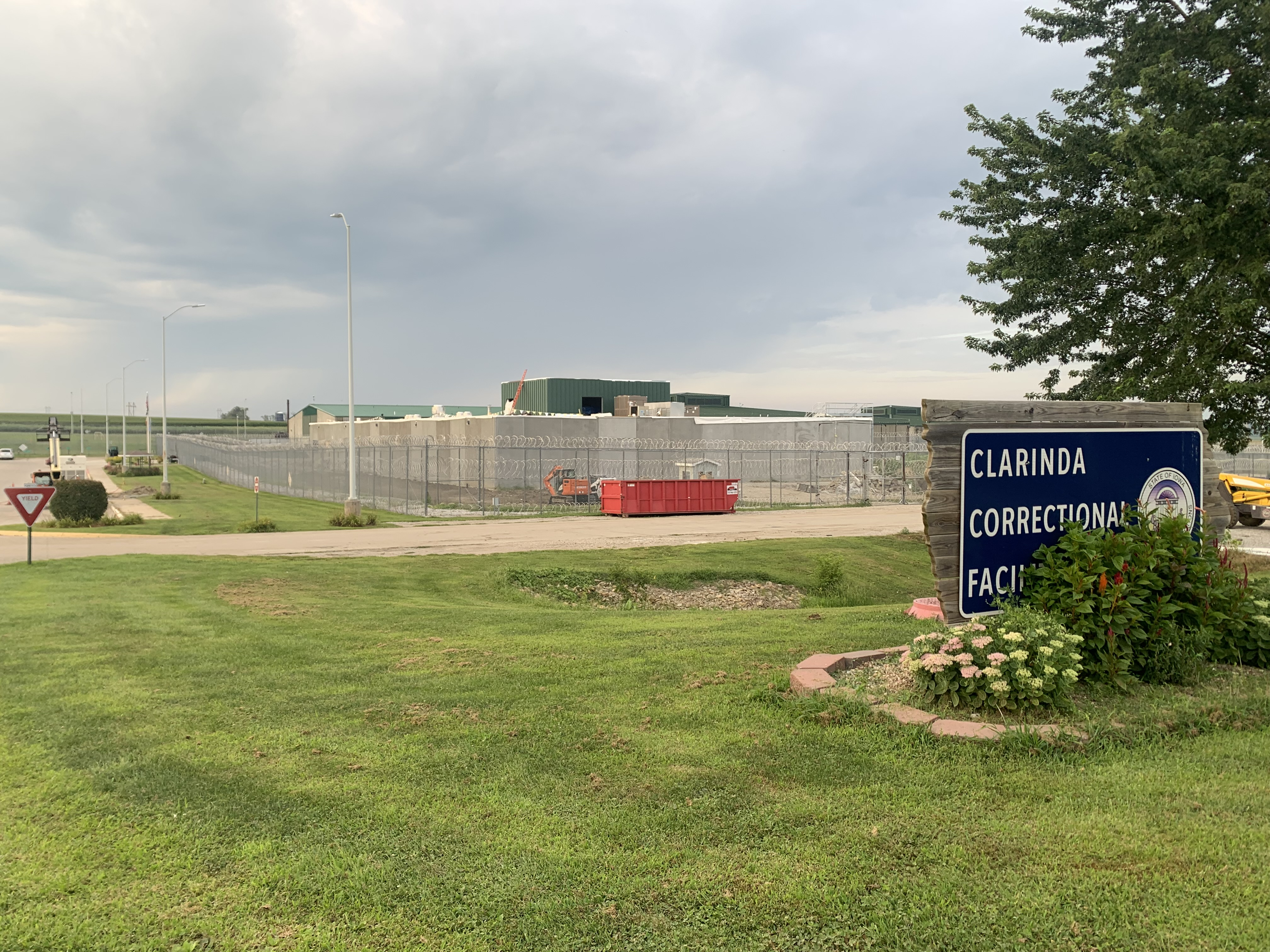
Clarinda Correctional Facility in northern Clarinda, Iowa

=== Health care ===
In 1884, the citizens rallied to build the third mental hospital in the state of Iowa. For over 100 years, the Clarinda State Hospital, known as the Clarinda Treatment Complex, was located on the north end of the city. On June 30, 2015, the hospital facility was shut down and all patient services terminated. The Clarinda Academy, a juvenile detention facility owned by Sequel Youth Services, was the sole occupant of the former hospital grounds until its closure in 2021.

In 1939, the Clarinda Municipal Hospital was created. In 1997, Clarinda Municipal Hospital's name was changed by its Board of Trustees to Clarinda Regional Health Center. In January 2012, the Clarinda Regional Health Center (CRHC) moved into a new replacement hospital and clinic facility on the south edge of Clarinda. CRHC is a municipal, non-profit, Critical Access Hospital licensed for 25 in-patient beds.

=== State prison ===
Clarinda also holds a state prison called the Clarinda Correctional Facility.

=== Transportation ===
Daily intercity bus service to Clarinda is provided by Jefferson Lines. The bus stop serves buses between Sioux Falls and Kansas City.

== Notable people ==
- Vernon Baker, one of seven African-American World War II Medal of Honor recipients
- Edwin Harris Colbert, paleontologist
- Aletha June Franklin, politician and civil rights activist
- William Peters Hepburn, U.S. representative
- Norman Maclean, author of A River Runs Through It
- Marilyn Maxwell, singer and film actress
- Glenn Miller, 1940s big band leader
- Jessie Field Shambaugh, founder of 4-H
