= Iowa Correctional Institution for Women =

Prison in Iowa, United States

Coordinates: 41.663°N 93.365°W

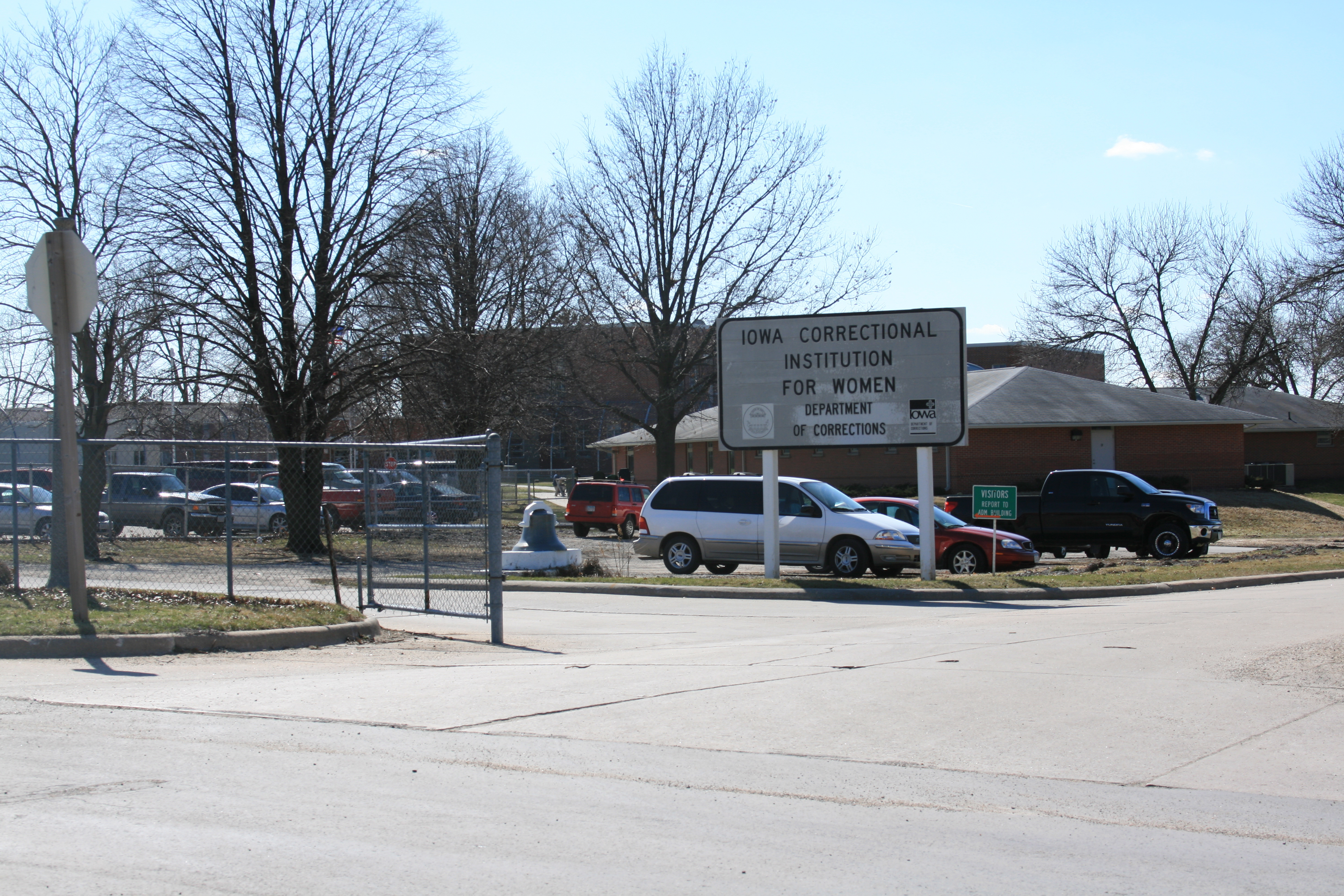
- Interactive map of Iowa Correctional Institution for Women
- Location: Mitchellville, Iowa
- Status: open
- Security class: medium and minimum security
- Capacity: 510
- Managed by: Iowa Department of Corrections

Iowa Correctional Institution for Women is an Iowa Department of Corrections medium/minimum security prison located in Mitchellville, Iowa. As of 2002 it had some 190 staff and 510 inmates.

It has both dormitory style units and celled housing, as well as a "return-to-confinement" facility used for intensive treatment of repeat offenders who violate parole.
