= Oakdale, Iowa =

- unincorporated community
- Nickname: Oakdale Hospital (TB)
- Location within Iowa Location within the United States
- Coordinates: 41°42′23″N 91°36′11″W
- Country: United States
- State: Iowa
- County: Johnson County
- Elevation: 807 ft (246 m)
- Time zone: UTC-6 (Central (CST))
  - Summer (DST): UTC-5 (CDT)
- ZIP code: 52319
- Area code: 319
- GNIS feature ID: 459738

Oakdale was an unincorporated rural residential village established in 1908 by the State of Iowa as a statewide treatment center for tuberculosis (TB) in rural Johnson County, located about five miles northwest of central Iowa City and now a part of Coralville, immediately adjacent to the community of North Liberty.

The site was chosen for its remoteness, its location along a railroad, and its proximity to University of Iowa Hospitals and Clinics in Iowa City.

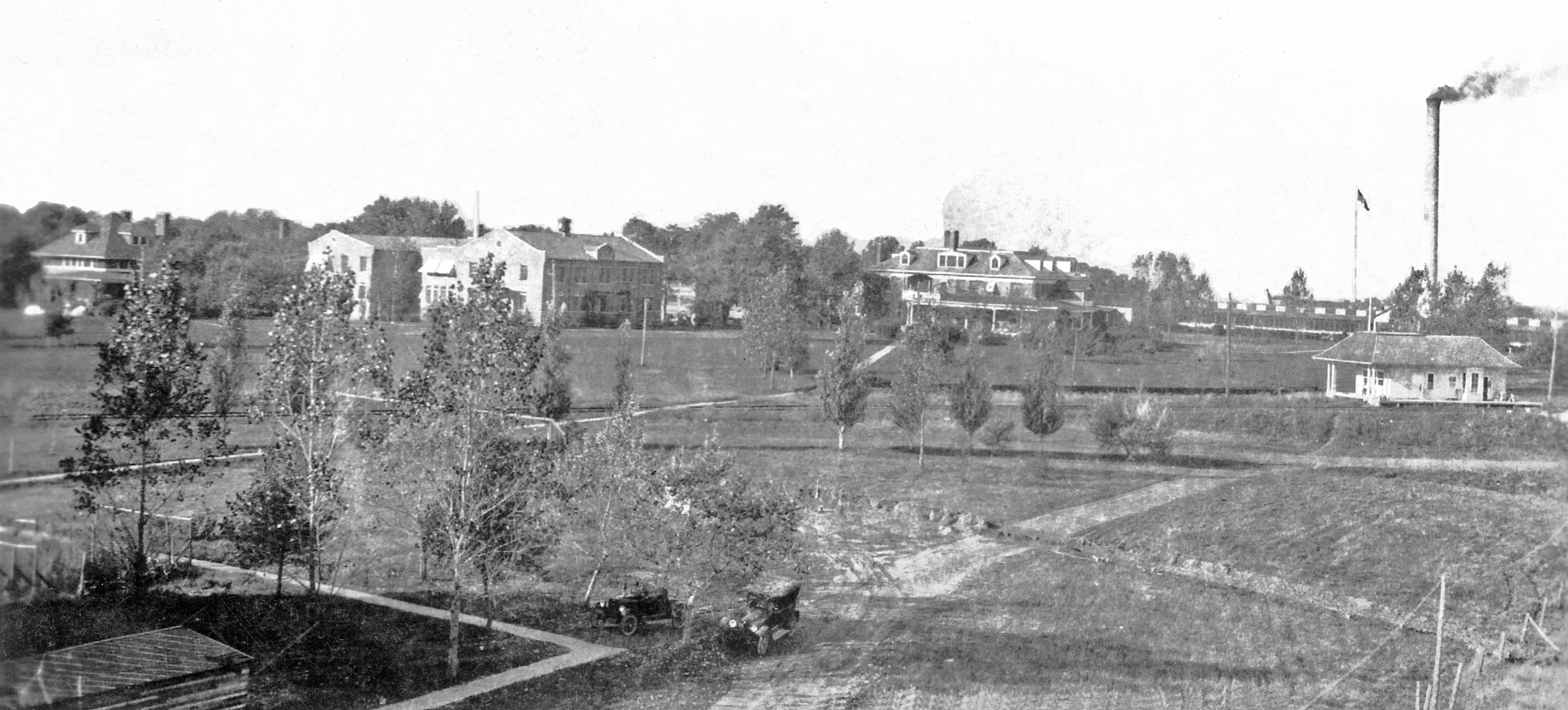
Oakdale view, 1928

As a partially self-sustaining community, Oakdale included a depot on the Cedar Rapids and Iowa City Railway (CRandIC) line, power plant, several residential patient and staff buildings, pharmacy, postal and administrative units, as well as associated facilities to support varied farming operations intended to help sustain the institution, including a large dairy.

Treatment protocols during much of Oakdale's more than half-century of operation included a regimen of rest, fresh air year around, and a nutritious diet. Before its naming in 1839, TB had been called "consumption" during much of its 4,500-year history as a human disease dating from Babylonian writings and Egyptian mummies.

Beginning with just eight patients but ending its first year with 45 in residence, Oakdale continued to grow, which forced repeated expansions, including a major one during 1926. Size of the associated farm ground also was increased to nearly 500 acres (200 hectares) from an original 280 acres (110 hectares). Its patient census peaked during the 1940s at about 400.

Improving public health standards and development of the first drug cure for TB in 1944 caused Oakdale usage to decline and the facility was morphed briefly into an alcohol treatment center about 1960 as alternate uses were sought. The entire facility and land were transferred to University of Iowa ownership in 1965, and the last tuberculosis patient was transferred to University of Iowa Hospitals and Clinics in 1981.

The university established its Agricultural Medical Research Facility at Oakdale in 1966 as the first step of a major evolution of this rural satellite campus, which now also houses the State Hygienic Laboratory in a new facility, as well as the university's 197-acre Oakdale Research Park, where, among many other facilities, the National Advanced Driving Simulator is located.

A separate entity that also carries the Oakdale name because of its proximity but was never a part of historic Oakdale, the Iowa prison system's Iowa Medical and Classification Center is located immediately across the road from the main Oakdale campus. The facility was opened in 1969 on slightly more than 50 acres (20 hectares) and now has more than 500 beds. It includes prison system entry from all parts of Iowa, plus the statewide prisoner medical treatment and psychiatric units. It also houses a maximum security facility.
