= Iowa Medical and Classification Center =

Prison in Iowa, United States

Coordinates: 41.713°N 91.610°W

- Interactive map of Iowa Medical and Classification Center
- Location: 2700 Coral Ridge Avenue Coralville, Iowa
- Status: open
- Security class: medium
- Capacity: 900
- Opened: 1969
- Managed by: Iowa Department of Corrections

The Iowa Medical and Classification Center (IMCC) is a medium security correctional facility located in the Johnson County community Oakdale in Coralville, Iowa. It currently houses about 900 inmates.

The main role of the IMCC is to serve as a reception and classification center for adults being sent to prison. Inmates here are assigned to one of the various prisons in Iowa. For this purpose, the center has a medium security general population unit. IMCC is also the home of the Iowa Forensic Psychiatric Hospital which holds up to 28 patients while being evaluated for mental competency. IMCC also provides medical, educational, and social services to other Iowa prisons. It holds a medium security general population of about 300 Incarcerated Individuals, who work to maintain the facility.

In February 2007 a portion of the perimeter fence surrounding the center was damaged in an ice storm. After making temporary plans, officials have proposed replacing all the perimeter fences at the facility - the proposal is currently being studied by the Iowa Legislature.

In early May 2020, James McKinney the facility's warden since 2015 suddenly resigned. Newspaper reports indicated that an investigation showed proper safeguards against COVID-19 were not being enforced. His replacement and the current warden of the IMCC is Mike Heinricy.

== Notable inmates ==
- Earl Edward Thompson - murderer who is currently the longest-serving inmate in Iowa, having served 65 years, 4 months and 14 days so far.

== See also ==
- List of Iowa state prisons
