= Fort Dodge Correctional Facility =

Prison in Iowa, United States

Coordinates: 42°29′9″N 94°11′33″W

- Interactive map of Fort Dodge Correctional Facility
- Location: Fort Dodge, Iowa
- Capacity: 1250
- Opened: 1998
- Managed by: Iowa Department of Corrections

The Fort Dodge Correctional Facility (FDCF) is a medium security institution located on 60 acres (240,000 m^{2}) of land in Fort Dodge, Iowa. The institution has 1,250 beds, and it has 1,312 inmates (1,162 at capacity) and another 75 in segregation (as of 29 April 2018). About 372 people are employed by the institution.

The Fort Dodge facility is based on a campus model, with administration and treatment buildings, five living units, and support structures such as warehouse and power plant buildings. The living areas are divided into units to provide easier supervision and control of inmates. Perimeter security is provided by a double fence with electronic detection.

The facility offers a highly structured five-month program called RIVERS (Redirecting Individual Values, Energy, Relationships, and Skills) that helps inmates to adjust to life and employment outside the correctional system. Treatment programs are offered for inmates with such needs. Inmates are assigned to a variety of jobs, which also include private sector jobs offered through a prison industries program located within the institution.

== Notable inmates ==
- Robert Gerald Hoose
- James and David Fryer, two brothers sentenced to life imprisonment for their role in the Gitchie Manitou murders
