= Beaver Township, Polk County, Iowa =

Township in Polk County, Iowa, U.S.

Coordinates: 41°38′41″N 93°23′14″W

Beaver Township is a township in Polk County, Iowa, United States.

== History ==
Beaver Township was organized before 1852. It was partitioned from land in Camp Township. It was reduced in size in 1878 when Clay Township was formed, taking a two-mile strip off its west side.

Its elevation is listed as 912 feet above mean sea level.
